= 1983 Nauruan parliamentary election =

Parliamentary elections were held in Nauru on 3 December 1983. As there were no political parties, all candidates ran as independents. Following the election, President Hammer DeRoburt was re-elected by ten votes to six.

== Results ==
Party	Votes	%	Seats
Independents	1,887	100.00	18
Total	1,887	100.00	18
Valid votes	1,887	97.77	
Invalid/blank votes	43	2.23	
Total votes	1,930	100.00	
Source: IPU, Gazette

=== By constituency ===
Constituency	Candidate	Votes	Notes
Aiwo	René Harris	156.666	Elected
Aiwo	Kinza Clodumar	122.8	Elected
Aiwo	David Libokomedo Agir	117.85	
Aiwo	Reginald Roderick Akiri	94.666	
Aiwo	Pamela Eibutsina Scriven	78.85	
Aiwo	Invalid/blank votes	5	
Aiwo	Total votes cast	255	
Anabar	Ludwig Scotty	91.833	Elected
Anabar	Maien Deireragea	78.816	Elected
Anabar	Ande Sankey Dabuae	73.516	
Anabar	John Daraoa Olsson	58.3	
Anabar	David Peter Gadaraoa	53.733	
Anabar	Invalid/blank votes	5	
Anabar	Total votes cast	161	
Anetan	Roy Degoregore	120.416	Elected
Anetan	Lawrence Stephen	118.5	Elected
Anetan	Bucky Adago Denuwea Ika	107.416	
Anetan	Ruby Thoma	105.75	
Anetan	Invalid/blank votes	3	
Anetan	Total votes cast	220	
Boe	Hammer DeRoburt	121	
Boe	Kenas Aroi	105	
Boe	Boranga Yeru Uera	74.666	
Boe	Invalid/blank votes	4	
Boe	Total votes cast	168	
Buada	Reuben Kun	111.533	Elected
Buada	Vinson Detenamo	87.016	Elected
Buada	Alec Hindmarsh Stephen	74.883	
Buada	Manfred Rabaima Depaune	72.733	
Buada	Rennie Angin Harris	65.833	
Buada	Invalid/blank votes	1	
Buada	Total votes cast	181	
Meneng	James Ategan Bop	136.805	Elected
Meneng	Robert Eoe	129.916	Elected
Meneng	John Carl Brechtefeld	96.948	
Meneng	Paul Denebauwa Jeremiah	89.766	
Meneng	Vinci Niel Clodumar	85.228	
Meneng	David Audi Dabwido	80.819	
Meneng	Dogaben Alec Harris	73.578	
Meneng	Dumas Dabwido	67.935	
Meneng	Invalid/blank votes	9	
Meneng	Total votes cast	289	
Ubenide	Buraro Detudamo	209.862	Elected
Ubenide	Bernard Dowiyogo	200.515	Elected
Ubenide	Kennan Adeang	160.830	Elected
Ubenide	Derog Gioura	130.376	Elected
Ubenide	Lagumot Harris	128.867	
Ubenide	Ekedu Rarube Itsimaera	113.908	
Ubenide	Mark Dennis Kun	102.709	
Ubenide	Nelson Eddy Scotty	98.024	
Ubenide	Paul Lawrence Maginikieo Ribauw	82.370	
Ubenide	Aloysious Arabao Iyomogo Amwano	70.067	
Ubenide	Invalid/blank votes	11	
Ubenide	Total votes cast	454	
Yaren	Pres Nimes Ekwona	112.15	Elected
Yaren	Joseph Detsimea Audoa	107.866	Elected
Yaren	Alfred Derangdedage Dick	85.5	
Yaren	Leo Keke	73.883	
Yaren	Anthony Audoa	70.416	
Yaren	Invalid/blank votes	5	
Yaren	Total votes cast	202	
Source: Republic of Nauru Government Gazette

== Aftermath ==
Following the elections, DeRoburt was re-elected president. He appointed long-term ally Buraro Detudamo as Minister for Works and Communications and Minister Assisting the President, and three former opponents to the other positions; Kenas Aroi as Minister for Finance, Bernard Dowiyogo as Minister for Justice and Lawrence Stephen as Minister for Education and Health.

Two MPs died in the session following the 1983 election. On 18 April 1984, Joseph Detsimea Audoa died, triggering a by-election in the Yaren Constituency. The by-election held on 26 May resulted in the election of Anthony Kododo Audoa. In the Meneng Constituency, James Ategan Bop died on 12 July 1984. In the by-election on 25 August, Parcelle Bop was elected as his successor.
