= 1976 Nauruan parliamentary election =

Parliamentary elections were held in Nauru on 18 December 1976. Following the election, Bernard Dowiyogo was elected President by Members of the Parliament.

== Background ==
In July 1976 Parliament had forced President Hammer DeRoburt – head of state since independence in 1968 – to resign after refusing to pass financial bills. However, within a few hours DeRoburt was re-elected president unopposed.

== Campaign ==
A total of 43 candidates contested the elections, two of whom were elected unopposed.

An informal Nauru Party was formed prior to the election, the first party on the island. Its members were younger MPs who had been concerned about the country's economic policy and saw DeRoburt's government of making decisions without proper discussion.

== Results ==
15 of the 18 incumbents were re-elected. Lagumot Harris, MP for Ubenide, was surprisingly defeated.

Party	Votes	%	Seats
Independents	1,155	100.00	18
Total	1,155	100.00	18
Valid votes	1,155	85.68	
Invalid/blank votes	193	14.32	
Total votes	1,348	100.00	
Source: IPU

=== By constituency ===
Constituency	Candidate	Votes	Notes
Aiwo	Edwin Tsitsi	94.53	Elected
Aiwo	Kinza Clodumar	93.33	Elected
Aiwo	Reginald Roderick Akiri	67.72	
Aiwo	August Detonga Deiye	64.53	
Aiwo	Clifford Andrew Simon	58.92	
Aiwo	Invalid/blank votes	1	
Aiwo	Total votes cast	168	
Anabar	David Peter Gadaraoa	70.35	Elected
Anabar	Obeira Menke	59.10	Elected
Anabar	Agoko Doguape	57.87	
Anabar	Felix Kun	55.60	
Anabar	Jerry Waidabu	35.65	
Anabar	Invalid/blank votes	7	
Anabar	Total votes cast	129	
Anetan	Roy Degoregore	—	Elected unopposed
Anetan	Lawrence Stephen	—	Elected unopposed
Boe	Hammer DeRoburt	112.00	Elected
Boe	Kenas Aroi	89.67	Elected
Boe	Gouradage Star	62.33	
Boe	Invalid/blank votes	2	
Boe	Total votes cast	146	
Buada	Austin Bernicke	81.25	Elected
Buada	Ruben Kun	67.35	Elected
Buada	Totouwa Depaune	62.47	
Buada	Alec Hindmarsh Stephen	55.48	
Buada	Rennie Harris	48.68	
Buada	Vinson Detenamo	47.37	
Buada	Invalid/blank votes	0	
Buada	Total votes cast	148	
Meneng	James Ategan Bop	120.05	Elected
Meneng	Robert Eoe	117.14	Elected
Meneng	Frank Canon	96.00	
Meneng	Christmas Bam	80.95	
Meneng	Rirainang Allan Thoma	79.22	
Meneng	David Audi Dabwido	74.42	
Meneng	Alec Dogaben Harris	67.46	
Meneng	Invalid/blank votes	4	
Meneng	Total votes cast	249	
Ubenide	Buraro Detudamo	147.62	Elected
Ubenide	Bernard Dowiyogo	125.17	Elected
Ubenide	Victor Eoaeo	119.05	Elected
Ubenide	Derog Gioura	118.73	Elected
Ubenide	Kennan Adeang	103.69	
Ubenide	Lagumot Harris	103.55	
Ubenide	James DeLuckner	71.68	
Ubenide	Paul Lawrence Ribauw	71.34	
Ubenide	Mark Dennis Kun	63.98	
Ubenide	Joseph Laben Hiram	60.06	
Ubenide	Invalid/blank votes	9	
Ubenide	Total votes cast	345	
Yaren	Joseph Detsimea Audoa	116.63	Elected
Yaren	Leo Keke	72.63	Elected
Yaren	Alfred Derangdedage Dick	65.33	
Yaren	Pres Nimes Ekwona	63.12	
Yaren	John Binono Willis	45.33	
Yaren	Invalid/blank votes	4	
Yaren	Total votes cast	163	
Source: Republic of Nauru Government Gazette

== Aftermath ==
The newly elected Parliament met on 21 December and re-elected Kenas Aroi was re-elected as Speaker. After DeRoburt refused to listen to suggestions that he appoint some new ministers to his cabinet, he lost the vote for president to Bernard Dowiyogo by nine votes to seven. Following the election, Nauru Party MPs met with DeRoburt and promised that Dowiyogo would resign and allow him to run unopposed if he reconsidered making changes to his cabinet. However, he refused, taking the view that the president should be free to choose their own cabinet.

Dowiyogo appointed a new cabinet, including Aroi, who subsequently resigned as Speaker. Samuel Tsitsi was elected in his place.

Position	Minister
President; Minister for External Affairs; Minister of Justice; Minister for the Public Service	Bernard Dowiyogo
Minister for Finance; Minister Assisting the President	Kinza Clodumar
Minister for Health; Minister for Education	Lawrence Stephen
Minister for Islands Development and Industry; Minister for Civil Aviation	Kenas Aroi
Minister for Works and Community Services	Ruben Kun

On 24 December DeRoburt called a special session of parliament to propose a motion that the new government had been formed outside the constitution, which did not provide for party politics. The debate was halted when Tsisti resigned as Speaker, also giving up his seat in Parliament. The following week David Gadaraoa was elected as the third Speaker of the parliamentary term.

MP Austin Bernicke died in January 1977. In the subsequent by-election in Buada on 5 March 1977, Totouwa Depaune was elected to parliament, defeating Alec Hindmarsh Stephen.

The Supreme Court later overturned the election of Derog Gioura. Kennan Adeang was declared elected in his place. In 1977 MP René Harris – who had replaced Tsitsi after his resignation – was removed from Parliament after being convicted of assault. In the subsequent by-election, he was re-elected with 95 votes, defeating Reginald Akiri (41 votes), John Bill (12) and August Deiye (10).
