= 1971 Nauruan parliamentary election =

Parliamentary elections were held in Nauru on 23 January 1971. As there were no political parties, all candidates ran as independents. Following the election, Hammer DeRoburt was re-elected president by members of the Parliament.

== Electoral system ==
The elections were the first to use the Dowdall system.

== Campaign ==
A total of 48 candidates contested the 18 seats. In Anabar Constituency the two incumbent MPs were returned unopposed.

== Results ==
Four sitting MPs were unseated in the election; Speaker Itubwa Amram, Asa Paul Diema, Totouwa Depaune and Derog Gioura.

Party	Votes	%	Seats
Independents	859	100.00	18
Total	859	100.00	18
Valid votes	859	97.61	
Invalid/blank votes	21	2.39	
Total votes	880	100.00	
Source: Pacific Islands Monthly

=== By constituency ===
Constituency	Candidate	Votes	Notes
Aiwo	Samuel Tsitsi	55.780	Elected
Aiwo	Kinza Clodumar	47.010	Elected
Aiwo	Itubwa Amram	45.540	
Aiwo	Reginald Akiri	30.730	
Aiwo	John Dedabwanouw Dube	26.106	
Aiwo	Patrick Deiri Uta Cook	23.782	
Aiwo	Deigoab Baigowa Marsh Bill	20.061	
Aiwo	John Agieman Thoma	19.075	
Aiwo	Libokamedo David Agir	18.700	
Aiwo	August Detonga Detonga Deiye	17.824	
Aiwo	Invalid/blank votes	3	
Aiwo	Total votes cast	107	
Anabar	Agoko Doguape	—	Elected unopposed
Anabar	David Peter Gadaraoa	—	Elected unopposed
Anetan	Roy Degoregore	52.495	Elected
Anetan	Lawrence Stephen	44.538	Elected
Anetan	Asa Paul Diema Denagabwida	37.978	
Anetan	Adago Denuwea Bucky Idarabwe	30.395	
Anetan	Clouston Donasa Quinn Diema	21.895	
Anetan	Jimmy Olsson	21.271	
Anetan	Atsibwebada Abouke	20.597	
Anetan	Invalid/blank votes	2	
Anetan	Total votes cast	90	
Boe	Hammer DeRoburt	77.783	Elected
Boe	Kenas Aroi	41.133	Elected
Boe	Labi Dagaben Harris	35.733	
Boe	Kelly Deouri Emiu	33.916	
Boe	Robert Heinrich Karl Grundler	23.766	
Boe	Invalid/blank votes	6	
Boe	Total votes cast	99	
Buada	Austin Bernicke	69.000	Elected
Buada	Ruben Kun	55.000	Elected
Buada	Totouwa Depaune	52.000	
Buada	Invalid/blank votes	0	
Buada	Total votes cast	96	
Meneng	James Ategan Bop	84.600	Elected
Meneng	David Audi Dabwido	48.807	Elected
Meneng	Ririanang Allan Thoma	48.142	
Meneng	Harold Emwan Jeremiah	47.611	
Meneng	Paul Denabauwa Jeremiah	40.547	
Meneng	Denumidaoao Christmas Bam	39.564	
Meneng	Dogaben Alec Jimrock Harris	35.576	
Meneng	Invalid/blank votes	4	
Meneng	Total votes cast	137	
Ubenide	Buraro Detudamo	142.526	Elected
Ubenide	Victor Eoaeo	105.084	Elected
Ubenide	Kennan Adeang	83.230	Elected
Ubenide	Lagumot Harris	79.336	Elected
Ubenide	Derog Gioura	78.728	
Ubenide	Paul Lawrence Maginkieo Ribauw	62.920	
Ubenide	Mark Dennis Kun Reuben	48.886	
Ubenide	Jacob Dagabwinare	40.559	
Ubenide	Antonia David Garabwan	37.678	
Ubenide	Invalid/blank votes	4	
Ubenide	Total votes cast	244	
Yaren	Joseph Detsimea Audoa	89.400	Elected
Yaren	Ludwig Dowong Keke	44.366	Elected
Yaren	Alfred Derangdedage Bribirinang Dick	35.850	
Yaren	John Binono Willis	35.200	
Yaren	Klaus Beiaua Jacob	34.933	
Yaren	Invalid/blank votes	2	
Yaren	Total votes cast	107	
Source: Republic of Nauru Government Gazette, 25 January 1971

== Aftermath ==
Following the elections, Hammer DeRoburt was the only candidate for president, and was elected unopposed by the newly elected Parliament. MPs also elected Kenas Aroi as Speaker and Victor Eoaeo as Deputy Speaker.

DeRoburt's cabinet was unchanged from the previous parliamentary term with James Ategan Bop as Minister of Finance, Austin Bernicke as Minister for Health and Education, Joseph Detsimea Audoa as Minister of Justice and Buraro Detudamo as Minister of Works and Community Services and Minister Assistant to the President. DeRoburt held the portfolios of External Affairs, Internal Affairs and Island Development and Industry.
