= 1977 Nauruan parliamentary election =

Early parliamentary elections were held in Nauru on 12 November 1977, after Parliament had been dissolved by President Bernard Dowiyogo due to a sustained campaign against the government led by former President Hammer DeRoburt, who had been voted out of office the previous year. Particular controversy had been caused by the Supply Act passed in June, and Dowiyogo stated that elections would be held to give him a mandate. After Parliament failed to approve the budget, Dowiyogo asked Speaker David Gadaraoa to dissolve the legislature.

Nine seats were won by supporters of Dowiyogo (who ran under the Nauru Party banner), eight by those of DeRoburt, and one by a candidate without any affiliation, but who supported the Nauru Party. Following the election, Dowiyogo was re-elected President by Parliament on 15 November.

== Campaign ==
A total of 52 candidates contested the 18 seats.

== Results ==
Party	Votes	%	Seats
Nauru Party			9
DeRoburt supporters			8
Independents			1
Total			18
Valid votes	1,557	97.37	
Invalid/blank votes	42	2.63	
Total votes	1,599	100.00	
Source: IPU, Gazette

=== By constituency ===
Constituency	Candidate	Votes	Notes
Aiwo	René Harris	97.0071	Elected
Aiwo	Kinza Clodumar	88.2904	Elected
Aiwo	Theodore Conrad Moses	71.4167	
Aiwo	Samuel Tsitsi	62.5261	
Aiwo	Deidienak Anako Daniel	54.3261	
Aiwo	Reginald Roderick Akiri	48.3238	
Aiwo	August Detonga Deiye	42.2309	
Aiwo	Invalid/blank votes	1	
Aiwo	Total votes cast	180	
Anabar	Obeira Menke	95.0833	Elected
Anabar	David Peter Gadaraoa	76.6667	Elected
Anabar	Maein Deireragea	68.3333	
Anabar	Agoko James Doguape	59.9167	
Anabar	Invalid/blank votes	0	
Anabar	Total votes cast	144	
Anetan	Roy Degoregore	115.3333	Elected
Anetan	Adago Deinuwea Bucky Idarabwe	104.5000	Elected
Anetan	Lawrence Stephen	92.3333	
Anetan	Rimone Jack Tom	73.2500	
Anetan	Invalid/blank votes	1	
Anetan	Total votes cast	186	
Boe	Hammer DeRoburt	123.7500	Elected
Boe	Kenas Aroi	86.2500	Elected
Boe	Alexander Deraoadi Deiye	67.2500	
Boe	Bill Gouratake Star	58.1666	
Boe	Invalid/blank votes	1	
Boe	Total votes cast	162	
Buada	Ruben Kun	89.6333	Elected
Buada	Totouwa Depaune	84.2500	Elected
Buada	Deang Detabene	73.0833	
Buada	Alec Hindermarsh Stephen	68.7000	
Buada	Rennie Angin Harris	51.9500	
Buada	Invalid/blank votes	6	
Buada	Total votes cast	167	
Meneng	James Ategan Bop	117.2333	Elected
Meneng	Robert Eoe	108.3096	Elected
Meneng	Frank Sinatra Jannecke Canon	105.2834	
Meneng	Denimidaoao Christmas Bam	76.1047	
Meneng	Paul Denebauwa Jeremiah	74.8500	
Meneng	David Audi Areyamago Dabwido	66.3023	
Meneng	Alec Dogaben Jimrock Harris	63.8309	
Meneng	Invalid/blank votes	11	
Meneng	Total votes cast	247	
Ubenide	Bernard Dowiyogo	172.6527	Elected
Ubenide	Lagumot Harris	111.7637	Elected
Ubenide	Buraro Detudamo	107.6857	Elected
Ubenide	Kennan Adeang	107.0424	Elected
Ubenide	Derog Gioura	100.0922	
Ubenide	Victor Eoaeo	84.6302	
Ubenide	Andrew Tamakin	72.7033	
Ubenide	Mark Denis Kun	56.7531	
Ubenide	Paul Ribauw	56.0412	
Ubenide	Joseph Hiram	47.2596	
Ubenide	James DeLuckner Aingimea	44.9044	
Ubenide	Johnny Aton Dongobir	43.4840	
Ubenide	Ateiwagaen Agege	43.1220	
Ubenide	Royden Hiram	42.4238	
Ubenide	Davey Hiram	38.6493	
Ubenide	Demode Idagnaderan Aliklik	35.9316	
Ubenide	Sohrab Detsiyogo	35.2571	
Ubenide	Invalid/blank votes	20	
Ubenide	Total votes cast	369	
Yaren	Joseph Detsimea Audoa	88.4167	Elected
Yaren	Leo Keke	77.2500	Elected
Yaren	Pres Nimes Ekwona	68.7500	
Yaren	Alfred Derangdedage Dick	61.4167	
Yaren	Invalid/blank votes	2	
Yaren	Total votes cast	144	
Source: Republic of Nauru Government Gazette, 14 November 1977

== Aftermath ==
Following the elections, the newly elected Parliament met on 15 November. Gadaraoa was re-elected as Speaker and Leo Keke as Deputy Speaker, both running unopposed.

Dowiyogo and DeRoburt were the two nominees for president, with Dowiyogo winning by nine votes to eight. He subsequently formed a cabinet consisting of Kenas Aroi as Minister of Island Development, Industry and Civil Aviation, Kinza Clodumar as Minister of Finance, Lagumot Harris as Minister of Education and Health and Ruben Kun as Minister of Works. After the new government was formed, DeRoburt refused to follow parliamentary procedure or instructions from the Speaker.

Following a heated budget debate at the start of January, during which Dowiyogo resigned and was re-elected, Clodumar was sacked as Minister of Finance and replaced by Kun. Leo Keke was appointed Minister of Works. However, Dowiyogo resigned again in April 1978 after a bill was defeated in parliament. Lagumot Harris was elected president, but resigned less than a month later when another bill was rejected. Following Harris' resignation, DeRoburt was elected.

His cabinet included Buraro Detudamo as Minister of Justice, James Ategan Bop as Minister of Finance, Joseph Detsimea Audoa as Minister for Education and Health and Totouwa Depaune as Minister for Works and Community Services. A cabinet reshuffle in December 1978 saw Harris replace Depaune as Minister for Works and Community Services, Kenas Aroi take over as Minister for Justice, Detudamo become Minister for Finance.
