= 1973 Nauruan parliamentary election =

Parliamentary elections were held in Nauru on 15 December 1973. As there were no political parties, all candidates ran as independents.

== Results ==
Three incumbent MPs, Victor Eoaeo, Derog Gioura and David Dabwido, lost their seats.

Party	Votes	%	Seats
Independents	1,111	100.00	18
Total	1,111	100.00	18
Valid votes	1,111	96.78	
Invalid/blank votes	37	3.22	
Total votes	1,148	100.00	
Source: Gazette, Nohlen et al.

=== By constituency ===
Constituency	Candidate	Votes	Notes
Aiwo	Edwin Tsitsi	85.083	Elected
Aiwo	Kinza Clodumar	84.750	Elected
Aiwo	Itubwa Amram	64.916	
Aiwo	Reginald Akiri	52.750	
Aiwo	Invalid/blank votes	4	
Aiwo	Total votes cast	142	
Anabar	Agoko Douguape	66.883	Elected
Anabar	David Peter Gadaraoa	53.633	Elected
Anabar	Ainungom Jerry Waidabu	43.500	
Anabar	Maein Deireragea	41.500	
Anabar	Renfrey Waidabu	33.100	
Anabar	Ateo Amram	30.883	
Anabar	Invalid/blank votes	6	
Anabar	Total votes cast	116	
Anetan	Roy Degoregore	84.566	Elected
Anetan	Lawrence Stephen	58.800	Elected
Anetan	Diema Paul Denagabwida	43.166	
Anetan	Bucky Idarabwe	43.116	
Anetan	Daroa Olsson	42.533	
Anetan	Dori Olsson	34.066	
Anetan	Invalid/blank votes	6	
Anetan	Total votes cast	131	
Boe	Kenas Aroi	—	Elected unopposed
Boe	Hammer DeRoburt	—	Elected unopposed
Buada	Austin Bernicke	69.566	Elected
Buada	Rueben Kun	59.050	Elected
Buada	Vincent Detenamo	45.433	
Buada	Totouwa Depaune	44.300	
Buada	Alec Stephen	41.083	
Buada	Rennie Harris	34.566	
Buada	Invalid/blank votes	7	
Buada	Total votes cast	127	
Meneng	James Ategan Bop	128.066	Elected
Meneng	Bobby Eoe	91.633	Elected
Meneng	Allan Thoma	80.333	
Meneng	Harold Jeremiah	70.133	
Meneng	David Audi Dabwido	69.316	
Meneng	Alec Harris	60.316	
Meneng	Invalid/blank votes	6	
Meneng	Total votes cast	210	
Ubenide	Buraro Detudamo	157.116	Elected
Ubenide	Bernard Dowiyogo	123.466	Elected
Ubenide	Ranibok Adeang	112.933	Elected
Ubenide	Lagumot Harris	108.733	Elected
Ubenide	Derog Gioura	98.033	
Ubenide	Victor Eoaeo	95.516	
Ubenide	Invalid/blank votes	7	
Ubenide	Total votes cast	291	
Yaren	Joseph Detsimea Audoa	101.333	Elected
Yaren	Alfred Dick	62.666	Elected
Yaren	Antonius Dimwareiy	57.833	
Yaren	John Willis	49.000	
Yaren	Invalid/blank votes	1	
Yaren	Total votes cast	131	
Source: Government Gazette, Government Gazette
