= List of Nauruan parliamentary by-elections =

By-elections are held for the Parliament of Nauru to fill vacancies that occur between general elections.

Previously, Nauruan general elections and by-elections used different voting systems. Nauru uses the unique Dowdall system for general elections, but for by-elections it used a more conventional preferential system. Candidates had to receive an absolute majority of first preference votes. If none did, then the candidate with the fewest first preference votes was eliminated, and the next preference votes on their ballots were distributed to the remaining candidates. This cycle continued until one candidate had an absolute majority of votes.

A previous version of the Electoral Act in force in 2012, under the section entitled "Counting of votes in election", differentiates the methods of counting votes in a general election and by-election. The section entitled "Counting of votes in election" in the current Electoral Act applies the same vote counting method for every election in Nauru.

== List of elections ==
=== 1971 Ubenide election ===
A writ was issued by the speaker of Parliament on 29 June 1971 to fill a vacancy in the Ubenide Constituency. The election was held on 14 August. The winner was determined after the four count of preferences.

Candidate	1st Preference Votes	Notes
Derog Gioura	91	Elected
Kennan Adeang	89	
Bernard Dowiyogo	77	
Mark Denis Kun	20	
Paul Lawrence Maginkieo Ribauw	4	
Invalid/blank votes	1	
Total votes cast	281	

=== 1972 Yaren election ===
A writ was issued by the acting speaker of Parliament on 20 April 1972 to fill a vacancy in the Yaren Constituency. The election was held on 3 June. The winner was determined after the fifth count of preferences.

Candidate	1st Preference Votes	Notes
Ludwig Keke	18	
Alfred Derangdedage Biribirinang Dick	15	Elected
Creswick Engame Agogenang	12	
John Akubor	11	
John Binono Willis	9	
Sunshine Keke	6	
Invalid/blank votes	2	
Total votes cast	71	

=== 1976 Yaren election ===
A writ was issued by the speaker of Parliament on 20 July 1976 to fill a vacancy in the Yaren Constituency. The election was held on 28 August.

Candidate	Counts		Notes
Candidate	1	5	Notes
Leo Keke	27	66	Elected
John Ebonoaiye Akubor	27	50	
Pres Nimes Ekwona	25	-	
Alfred Derangdedage Dick	14	-	
John Binono Willis	13	-	
Patrick Jess Cain	7	-	
Udire Abaubo	3	-	
Total votes cast		116	

=== February 1977 Aiwo election ===
A by-election was triggered in the Aiwo Constituency when Speaker Edwin Tsitsi resigned as MP in December 1976. The election was held on 5 February 1977.

Candidate	Counts		Notes
Candidate	1	2	Notes
René Harris	80	94	Elected
Samuel Edwin Tsitsi	50	79	
Reginald Roderick Akiri	30	-	
Invalid/blank votes		0	
Total votes cast		173	

=== 1977 Buada election ===
MP Austin Bernicke died in January 1977. A writ was issued by the speaker of Parliament on 17 January 1977 to fill a vacancy in the Buada Constituency. The election was held on 5 March.

Candidate	1st Preference Votes	Notes
Totouwa Depaune	80	Elected
Alec Hindmarsh Stephen	56	
Invalid/blank votes	0	
Total votes cast	136	

=== 1977 Anetan election ===
A writ was issued by the speaker of Parliament on 11 February 1977 to fill a vacancy in the Anetan Constituency. The election was held on 19 March.

Candidate	1st Preference Votes	Notes
Roy Degoregore	90	Elected
Bucky Idarabwe	79	
Rimone Tom	6	
Invalid/blank votes	2	
Total votes cast	177	

=== June 1977 Aiwo election ===
A writ was issued by the speaker of Parliament on 7 March 1977 to fill a vacancy in the Aiwo Constituency. MP René Harris lost his seat due to being convicted by a court of assault. The election was initially scheduled for 16 April, but it was deferred by a court judgment. By 9 May, the election was rescheduled for 4 June. The election was held on 4 June. Harris was re-elected.

Candidate	1st Preference Votes	Notes
René Harris	95	Elected
Reginald Roderick Akiri	41	
John Cole Darabwana Bill	12	
August Detonga Deiye	10	
Invalid/blank votes	1	
Total votes cast	159	

=== 1978 Ubenide election ===
A writ was issued by the speaker of Parliament on 20 September 1978 to fill a vacancy in the Ubenide Constituency. The election was held on 21 October.

Candidate	Counts			Notes
Candidate	1	2	3	Notes
Derog Gioura	181	186	197	Elected
Kennan Adeang	160	166	175	
Victor Idarababwin Eoaeo	17	20	-	
Lui Victor Eoaeo	14	-	-	
Invalid/blank votes			3	
Total votes cast			372	

=== 1979 Aiwo election ===
A writ was issued by the speaker of Parliament on 6 February 1979 to fill a vacancy in the Aiwo Constituency. The election was held on 10 March.

Candidate	Counts				Notes
Candidate	1	2	3	4	Notes
David Agir	58	60	64	105	Elected
Reginald Roderick Akiri	50	54	65	87	
Theodore Conrad Moses	51	58	63	-	
Ririenang Allan Thoma	20	20	-	-	
August Detonga Deiye	13	-	-	-	
Invalid/blank votes				1	
Total votes cast				193	

=== 1981 Aiwo election ===
A writ was issued by the speaker of Parliament on 10 June 1981 to fill a vacancy in the Aiwo Constituency. MP René Harris resigned and ran in the resulting by-election as a way to test whether the voters of his constituency supported him. The election was held on 18 July. Harris was re-elected.

Candidate	1st Preference Votes	Notes
René Harris	111	Elected
Samuel Edwin Tsitsi	48	
August Detonga Deiye	28	
Ateo Leslie Will Amram	10	
Invalid/blank votes	1	
Total votes cast	198	

=== 1981 Anabar election ===
Speaker David Peter Gadaraoa resigned from parliament in September 1981. A writ was issued by the new speaker of Parliament, Reuben Kun, on 18 September 1981 to fill a vacancy in the Anabar Constituency. The election was held on 24 October.

Candidate	Counts		Notes
Candidate	1	2	Notes
Maein Deireragea	53	64	Elected
Ludwig Scotty	48	60	
Jerry Waidabu	23	-	
Invalid/blank votes		8	
Total votes cast		132	

=== 1984 Yaren election ===
MP Joseph Detsimea Audoa died on 18 April 1984. A writ was issued by the speaker of Parliament on 25 April 1984 to fill a vacancy in the Yaren Constituency. The election was held on 26 May.

Candidate	1st Preference Votes	Notes
Anthony Kododo Detsimea Audoa	95	Elected
Alfred Derangdedage Dick	39	
Leo Keke	44	
Invalid/blank votes	1	
Total votes cast	179	

=== 1984 Meneng election ===
MP James Ategan Bop died on 12 July 1984. A writ was issued by the speaker of Parliament on 23 July 1984 to fill a vacancy in the Meneng Constituency. The election was held on 25 August.

Candidate	Counts		Notes
Candidate	1	8	Notes
Parcelle Bop	74	162	Elected
Nimrod Botelanga	60	109	
Frank Sinatra Janecke Canon	56	-	
Vinci Niel Clodumar	37	-	
Paul Denebaua Jeremiah	28	-	
Alex Dogaben Jimrock Harris	6	-	
Ralph Steven	5	-	
Deage Dogurube Dabwido	4	-	
David Audi Dabwido	1	-	
Invalid/blank votes		11	
Total votes cast		282	

=== 1988 Ubenide election ===
A writ was issued by the speaker of Parliament on 29 July 1988 to fill a vacancy in the Ubenide Constituency. The election was held on 25 August.

Candidate	Counts								Notes
Candidate	1	2	3	4	5	6	7	8	Notes
Kennan Adeang	180	180	181	182	188	200	224	243	Elected
Francis Garoa	72	73	73	76	76	80	87	121	
Royden Basil Hiram	63	63	65	65	65	73	84	104	
Lagumot Harris	57	58	59	61	66	66	73	-	
Paul Laurence Maginkieo Ribauw	36	37	37	38	40	49	-	-	
Ekedu Rarube Itsimaera	30	30	31	31	33	-	-	-	
Mark Dennis Gourdage Kun	11	12	13	15	-	-	-	-	
Joseph Hiram	8	9	9	-	-	-	-	-	
Andre Godoru Notte	6	6	-	-	-	-	-	-	
Samuel Cagney Scotty	5	-	-	-	-	-	-	-	
Invalid/blank votes								13	
Total votes cast								481	

=== 1991 Boe election ===
MP Kenas Aroi died on 22 January 1991. A writ was issued by the speaker of Parliament on 28 January 1991 to fill a vacancy in the Boe Constituency. The election was held on 2 March.

Candidate	Counts					Notes
Candidate	1	2	3	4	5	Notes
August Detonga Deiye	52	57	84	115	156	Elected
Baron Waqa	58	61	74	86	123	
Clinton Denton Benjamin	62	66	67	78	-	
Volmer Aloysious Appi	41	49	54	-	-	
Michael Mathias Aroi	37	46	-	-	-	
Kelly Deouri Emiu	29	-	-	-	-	
Invalid/blank votes					4	
Total votes cast					283	

=== 1992 Boe election ===
MP Hammer DeRoburt died on 15 July 1992. A writ was issued by the speaker of Parliament on 27 July 1992 to fill a vacancy in the Boe Constituency. The election was held on 22 August.

Candidate	Counts								Notes
Candidate	1	2	3	4	5	6	7	8	Notes
Michael Mathias Aroi	89	91	94	95	102	107	118	165	Elected
Clinton Denton Benjamin	76	79	83	86	89	90	95	107	
Cridden Alexius Appi	23	24	25	26	28	42	59	-	
Dale Richard Cecil	23	23	23	23	27	33	-	-	
Remus Semisi Capelle	19	20	20	21	26	-	-	-	
Ereeti Nangindeit Batiua	16	17	18	21	-	-	-	-	
John Walt Fagan Adam	9	9	9	-	-	-	-	-	
Boronga Yeru Uera	9	9	-	-	-	-	-	-	
Ross Cain	8	-	-	-	-	-	-	-	
Invalid/blank votes								9	
Total votes cast								281	

=== 1994 Ubenide election ===
A writ was issued by the speaker of Parliament on 13 June 1994 to fill a vacancy in the Ubenide Constituency. The election was held on 9 July.

Candidate	Counts									Notes
Candidate	1	2	3	4	5	6	7	8	9	Notes
Lagumot Harris	128	128	134	139	150	156	181	214	306	Elected
Aloysius Edrick Arobao Iyomogo Amwano	120	121	121	122	126	141	162	201	296	
Timothy Robidok Detudamo	140	140	143	150	153	161	168	187	-	
Alf Diringa Itsimaera	66	66	67	68	73	78	91	-	-	
Freddie Pitcher	55	55	58	59	63	66	-	-	-	
Royden Basil Hiram	31	32	33	35	37	-	-	-	-	
Paul Lawrence Maginkieo Ribauw	24	25	25	29	-	-	-	-	-	
Russell Kun	20	20	21	-	-	-	-	-	-	
Joseph Hiram	15	15	-	-	-	-	-	-	-	
Charles Lanza Dabana	3	-	-	-	-	-	-	-	-	
Invalid/blank votes									20	
Total votes cast									622	

=== 1996 Buada election ===
A writ was issued by the speaker of Parliament on 28 June 1996 to fill a vacancy in the Buada Constituency. The election was held on 9 July.

Candidate	Counts				Notes
Candidate	1	2	3	4	Notes
Vinson Detenamo	85	89	97	109	Elected
Lyn Terangi Adam	38	45	55	93	
Nelson De-Burma Tamakin	39	43	50	-	
Rayong Anton Borben Itsimaera	21	25	-	-	
Miniva Depaune	19	-	-	-	
Invalid/blank votes				1	
Total votes cast				203	

=== 1996 Anetan election ===
MP Roy Degoregore died on 24 August 1996. A writ was issued by the speaker of Parliament on 2 September 1996 to fill a vacancy in the Anetan Constituency. The election was held on 5 October.

Candidate	Counts												Notes
Candidate	1	2	3	4	5	6	7	8	9	10	11	12	Notes
Remy Namaduk	113	113	113	114	116	120	125	131	139	156	181	219	Elected
Gaiman Deireragea	64	64	65	67	71	73	76	80	96	109	134	192	
Rimone Tom	50	51	53	54	54	54	58	62	63	77	96	-	
Vassal Gadoengin	39	40	40	40	41	43	45	48	57	69	-	-	
Bucky Adago Deinuwea Ika	41	42	42	42	43	45	47	48	56	-	-	-	
Nicholas Yanaw Duburiya	21	22	22	24	27	32	33	42	-	-	-	-	
Jacobus Tevaki Fritz	21	21	21	21	23	25	27	-	-	-	-	-	
George Caleb	13	13	16	17	19	19	-	-	-	-	-	-	
Julie June Olsson	14	14	16	16	17	-	-	-	-	-	-	-	
Haseldon Buraman	14	14	14	16	-	-	-	-	-	-	-	-	
Jane Lewis	9	9	9	-	-	-	-	-	-	-	-	-	
John Daroa Olsson	7	8	-	-	-	-	-	-	-	-	-	-	
Jaxon Dori Olsson	5	-	-	-	-	-	-	-	-	-	-	-	
Invalid/blank votes												17	
Total votes cast												428	

=== February 1998 by-elections ===
In early 1998, five Nauruan MPs were dismissed by Speaker Kennan Adeang. As a result, a writ was issued by the speaker of Parliament on 22 January 1998 to fill a vacancy in the following constituencies: Boe, Buada, Meneng, Ubenide, and Yaren. The elections were held on 21 February. Three of the five dismissed MPs were re-elected.

Constituency	Candidate	Counts			Notes
Constituency	Candidate	1	2	3	Notes
Boe	Ross Cain	87	119	183	Elected
Boe	Clinton Denton Benjamin	137	148	169	
Boe	Baron Waqa	71	85	-	
Boe	Michael Mathias Aroi	57	-	-	
Boe	Invalid/blank votes			2	
Boe	Total votes cast			354	
Constituency	Candidate	Counts			Notes
Constituency	Candidate	1	2	3	Notes
Buada	Ruben Kun	156			Elected
Buada	Ivor Detenamo	90			
Buada	Invalid/blank votes			0	
Buada	Total votes cast			246	
Constituency	Candidate	Counts			Notes
Constituency	Candidate	1	2	3	Notes
Meneng	Nimrod Botelanga	247			Elected
Meneng	Vinci Niel Clodumar	197			
Meneng	Joshua Porthos Bop	28			
Meneng	John Brechtefeld	15			
Meneng	Invalid/blank votes			4	
Meneng	Total votes cast			491	
Constituency	Candidate	Counts			Notes
Constituency	Candidate	1	2	3	Notes
Ubenide	Aloysius Iyomago Amwano	301	325	370	Elected
Ubenide	Lagumot Harris	289	307	333	
Ubenide	Royden Hiram	57	71	-	
Ubenide	Paul Maginkieo Ribauw	56	-	-	
Ubenide	Invalid/blank votes			5	
Ubenide	Total votes cast			708	
Constituency	Candidate	Counts			Notes
Constituency	Candidate	1	2	3	Notes
Yaren	Anthony D. Audoa	129			Elected
Yaren	Pres Nimes Ekwona	69			
Yaren	Leo Keke	56			
Yaren	Invalid/blank votes			2	
Yaren	Total votes cast			256	

=== 1998 Aiwo election ===
A writ was issued by the speaker of Parliament on 24 June 1998 to fill a vacancy in the Aiwo Constituency. The election was held on 25 July.

Candidate	1st Preference Votes	Notes
René Harris	189	Elected
Richard Dugan Bill	94	
Invalid/blank votes	10	
Total votes cast	293	

=== 2001 Ubenide election ===
A writ was issued by the speaker of Parliament on 7 November 2001 to fill a vacancy in the Ubenide Constituency. The election was held on 8 December.

Candidate	Fractional Total	Notes
Aloysius Iyomago Amwano	323.593	Elected
David Adeang	263.067	Elected
Derog Gioura	202.514	Elected
Bernard Dowiyogo	193.837	Elected
Joseph Laben Hiram	178.326	
Alf Diringa Itsimaera	175.076	
Paul Lawrence Maginkieo Ribauw	158.947	
Russell Kun	157.951	
Milton Jonathan Benjamin	151.348	
Kennan Adeang	149.577	
Renos Renige Agege	127.527	
Knox Tulensru Tulenoa	114.244	
Francis Detsibanga Amram	113.226	
Charles Lanza Dabana	100.174	
Invalid/blank votes	41	
Total votes cast	782	

=== 2005 Anetan election ===
Speaker Vassal Gadoengin died on 15 December 2004. A writ was issued by the speaker of Parliament on 24 December 2004 to fill a vacancy in the Anetan Constituency. The election was held on 22 January.

Candidate	Counts						Notes
Candidate	1	2	3	4	5	6	Notes
Cyril Buramen	155	156	157	165	180	284	Elected
Remy Namaduk	133	134	136	137	146	164	
Ernest Gisephri Stephen	91	92	96	101	122	-	
Darryle Eneiwa Tom	26	29	30	45	-	-	
Rimone Tom	26	26	29	-	-	-	
Arabella Sra Detenamo	10	11	-	-	-	-	
Victory Anebeni Japhet	7	-	-	-	-	-	
Invalid/blank votes						8	
Total votes cast						448	

=== 2017 Ubenide election ===
MP Valdon Dowiyogo's death triggered a by-election. A writ was issued by the speaker of Parliament on 22 December 2016 to fill a vacancy in the Ubenide Constituency. The election was held on 19 January 2017. A report from the Nauru Electoral Commission noted that, given the amount of time since the last by-election in Nauru, some voters were confused by the preferential system used as opposed to the Dowdall system used in general elections. The MP who was elected, Gabrissa Hartman, was the third woman elected to the Parliament of Nauru.

Candidate	Counts												Notes
Candidate	1	2	3	4	5	6	7	8	9	10	11	12	Notes
Gabrissa Hartman	157	159	161	167	177	185	210	226	284	396	505	817	Elected
Wawani Dowiyogo	289	292	300	309	314	317	337	351	362	431	561	696	
Reagan Aliklik	271	271	278	281	286	294	298	309	340	391	447	-	
Peter Diema	227	229	229	234	239	245	254	256	265	295	-	-	
Vyko Adeang	178	179	183	193	207	214	220	234	262	-	-	-	
Kay Aliklik	61	63	64	71	78	90	97	137	-	-	-	-	
David Detageouwa	70	72	74	76	77	90	97	-	-	-	-	-	
Berrick Dowiyogo	63	65	72	73	76	78	-	-	-	-	-	-	
Aloysius Amwano	54	58	58	58	59	-	-	-	-	-	-	-	
Ken Detudamo	46	48	50	51	-	-	-	-	-	-	-	-	
Ricky Adde Bam	44	44	44	-	-	-	-	-	-	-	-	-	
Albert Teimitsi	32	33	-	-	-	-	-	-	-	-	-	-	
David Dowiyogo	21	-	-	-	-	-	-	-	-	-	-	-	
Invalid/blank votes												37	
Total votes cast												1550	

=== 2019 Anabar election ===
MP Jaden Dogireiy's court conviction and subsequent disqualification from parliament triggered a by-election. A writ was issued by the speaker of Parliament on 1 May 2019 to fill a vacancy in the Anabar Constituency. The election was held on 30 May. Due to how close the results between candidates Ludwig Scotty and Pyon Deiye were, a recount was triggered. The election used the Dowdall system of voting.

Candidate	Preference votes									Total	Notes
Candidate	1	2	3	4	5	6	7	8	9	Total	Notes
Ludwig Scotty	145	85	75	45	41	30	36	49	85	257.662	Elected
Pyon Deiye	143	82	67	45	51	49	45	65	44	255.392	
Jeb Nobob Eric Bop	102	74	66	62	64	80	60	49	34	221.108	
Akua Marita Agigo	101	75	59	56	46	55	53	69	77	215.285	
Johnny-Young Olsson	33	71	91	68	93	85	53	56	41	167.727	
Transom Duburiya	22	45	68	89	87	96	67	95	22	146.708	
Corey Milton Menke	17	53	59	88	97	87	105	56	29	144.289	
Dawson Agege	23	49	49	79	67	49	89	79	107	139.628	
Damien Joram	5	57	57	59	45	60	83	73	152	124.121	
Invalid/blank votes										21	
Total votes cast										612	
