= 1980 Nauruan parliamentary election =

Parliamentary elections were held in Nauru on 6 December 1980. As there were no political parties, all candidates ran as independents. The election was won by supporters of President Hammer DeRoburt, who re-elected him President on 9 December.

== Results ==
Three prominent MPs lost their seats, Minister of Justice Leo Keke, former President Lagumot Harris and Roy Degoregore.

Party	Votes	%	Seats
Independents	1,540	100.00	18
Total	1,540	100.00	18
Valid votes	1,540	97.04	
Invalid/blank votes	47	2.96	
Total votes	1,587	100.00	
Source: Gazette, Nohlen et al.

=== By constituency ===
Constituency	Candidate	Votes	Notes
Aiwo	René Harris	142.7	Elected
Aiwo	Libokomedo David Agir	105.816	Elected
Aiwo	Samuel Tsitsi	98.55	
Aiwo	Reginald Akiri	80.85	
Aiwo	Pamela Ebotsina Scriven	70.9	
Aiwo	August Detonga Deiye	67.133	
Aiwo	Invalid/blank votes	4	
Aiwo	Total votes cast	235	
Anabar	David Peter Gadaraoa	—	Elected unopposed
Anabar	Obeira Menke	—	Elected unopposed
Anetan	Lawrence Stephen	109.666	Elected
Anetan	Adago Deinuwea Bucky Ika	102.083	Elected
Anetan	Roy Degoregore	94.833	
Anetan	Vassal Gadoengin	68.416	
Anetan	Invalid/blank votes	10	
Anetan	Total votes cast	190	
Boe	Hammer DeRoburt	124.333	Elected
Boe	Kenas Aroi	100.833	Elected
Boe	Yeru Boronga Uera	60.416	
Boe	Frank Randolph Smith	58.166	
Boe	Invalid/blank votes	1	
Boe	Total votes cast	166	
Buada	Reuben Kun	100.833	Elected
Buada	Totouwa Depaune	86.416	Elected
Buada	Alec Hindmarsh Stephen	70	
Buada	Deang Detabene	61.5	
Buada	Invalid/blank votes	3	
Buada	Total votes cast	156	
Meneng	Robert Eoe	137.725	Elected
Meneng	James Ategan Bop	107.964	Elected
Meneng	Frank Sinatra Jannecke Canon	104.327	
Meneng	Paul Denabawa Jeremiah	81.285	
Meneng	Christmas Denimidaoao Bam	70.242	
Meneng	David Audi Areyemago Dabwido	69.136	
Meneng	Lucas Janoa Depoudu	68.939	
Meneng	Alec Dogaben Jimrock Harris	67.021	
Meneng	Invalid/blank votes	6	
Meneng	Total votes cast	266	
Ubenide	Buraro Detudamo	202.716	Elected
Ubenide	Bernard Dowiyogo	187.9	Elected
Ubenide	Kennan Adeang	169.25	Elected
Ubenide	Derog Gioura	153.6	Elected
Ubenide	Lagumot Harris	143.083	
Ubenide	Joseph Laben Hiram	98.95	
Ubenide	Invalid/blank votes	20	
Ubenide	Total votes cast	410	
Yaren	Joseph Detsimea Audoa	96.683	Elected
Yaren	Pres Nimes Ekwona	81.483	Elected
Yaren	Leo Keke	66.183	
Yaren	Alfred Derangdedage Dick	59.1	
Yaren	De-Gabwinare Jacob	45.8	
Yaren	John Binono Willis	45.2	
Yaren	Invalid/blank votes	3	
Yaren	Total votes cast	164	
Source: Government Gazette

== Aftermath ==
The newly elected Parliament convened on 9 December. David Gadaroa was re-elected as Speaker, with James Ategan Bop re-elected as Deputy Speaker. Hammer DeRoburt was elected President unopposed after the only other nominee declined to participate. He appointed a new government with Kenas Aroi as Minister for Finance, Joseph Detsimea Audoa as Minister for Justice, Buraro Detudamo as Minister for Works and Minister Assisting the President and Lawrence Stephen as Minister for Education and Health.

In July 1981 René Harris resigned to contest a by-election and test his support. The by-election was held on 18 July and saw Harris re-elected with 111 votes; Samuel Tsitsi received 48, August Detonga Deiye received 28 and Ateo Leslie Will Amram 10. There was also one invalid vote, for a total of 198 votes.
