= 1997 Nauruan parliamentary election =

Early parliamentary elections were held in Nauru on 8 February 1997, following a series of no-confidence votes in the Presidency,. which had changed hands three times since the 1995 elections. All candidates ran as independents. Following the elections, Kinza Clodumar was elected president by the Parliament, which included four new members. Voter turnout was 91.8%.

The only female member in the previous Parliament, Ruby Dediya (MP for Anetan/Ewa), lost her seat, meaning the resulting Parliament was composed exclusively of men. There were to be no more women MPs until 2013.

== Results ==
Party	Votes	%	Seats
Independents	3,045	100.00	18
Total	3,045	100.00	18
Valid votes	3,045	97.01	
Invalid/blank votes	94	2.99	
Total votes	3,139	100.00	
Registered voters/turnout	3,418	91.84	
Source: Gazette, Nohlen et al.

=== By constituency ===
Constituency	Candidate	Votes	Notes
Aiwo	Godfrey Thoma	170.726	Elected
Aiwo	René Harris	147.685	Elected
Aiwo	David Libokmedo Agir	120.071	
Aiwo	Theodore Conrad Moses	101.050	
Aiwo	Richard Dugan Bill	88.769	
Aiwo	Aongo Alfred Moses	83.122	
Aiwo	Pamela Eibutina Scriven	74.185	
Aiwo	Invalid/blank votes	10	
Aiwo	Total votes cast	313	
Anabar	Ludwig Scotty	150.901	Elected
Anabar	James Deireragea	128.817	Elected
Anabar	Maien Deireragea	95.884	
Anabar	David Peter Gadaraoa	89.301	
Anabar	Rudolph Garoa	86.984	
Anabar	Godrey Itine Waidabu	80.218	
Anabar	Invalid/blank votes	7	
Anabar	Total votes cast	265	
Anetan	Remy Namaduk	138.740	Elected
Anetan	Vassal Gadoengin	116.469	Elected
Anetan	Ruby Dediya	106.696	
Anetan	Lawrence Stephen	105.479	
Anetan	Gaimen Deireragea	100.168	
Anetan	Nicholas Yanaw Duburiya	85.938	
Anetan	Jacob Tevaki Fritz	85.588	
Anetan	Adagobucky Deinuwea Ika	82.255	
Anetan	John Daroa Olsson	80.962	
Anetan	Rimone Tom	80.608	
Anetan	Julie June Olsson	80.063	
Anetan	Invalid/blank votes	17	
Anetan	Total votes cast	369	
Boe	Clinton Benjamin	153.572	Elected
Boe	Kinza Clodumar	140.670	Elected
Boe	Winnie Ruwi Tsitsi	135.948	
Boe	Michael Mathias Aroi	127.465	
Boe	Baron Waqa	116.727	
Boe	Tazio Gideon	111.326	
Boe	August Detonga Deiye	101.383	
Boe	Leslie Dogida Adam	70.439	
Boe	Isaac Eobwaoin Aremwa	70.401	
Boe	Idarabwabwin Deiden Kiki	67.471	
Boe	Invalid/blank votes	12	
Boe	Total votes cast	386	
Buada	Vinson Detenamo	132.717	Elected
Buada	Reuben Kun	115.718	Elected
Buada	Tamaiti Willie Star	115.234	
Buada	Nelson De Burma Tamakin	107.201	
Buada	Manfred Depaune	104.535	
Buada	Invalid/blank votes	3	
Buada	Total votes cast	255	
Meneng	Nimrod Botelanga	230.103	Elected
Meneng	Dogabe Abner Jeremiah	227.379	Elected
Meneng	David Aingimea	174.453	
Meneng	Vinci Niel Clodumar	165.675	
Meneng	Porthos Bwaidongo Bop	133.650	
Meneng	Benedict Doneke Kepae	128.895	
Meneng	David Audi Dabwido	127.005	
Meneng	Akeidu Kepae	113.287	
Meneng	Ralph Stephen	107.771	
Meneng	Johnny Taumea Agadio	106.015	
Meneng	Invalid/blank votes	12	
Meneng	Total votes cast	529	
Ubenide	Lagumot Harris	278.618	Elected
Ubenide	Bernard Dowiyogo	249.550	Elected
Ubenide	Kennan Adeang	244.271	Elected
Ubenide	Derog Gioura	237.285	Elected
Ubenide	Aloysious Edrick Arabao Iyomago Amwano	204.418	
Ubenide	Robidok Timothy Detudamo	192.592	
Ubenide	Paul Lawrence Maginkieo Ribauw	174.485	
Ubenide	Alf Diranga Itsimaera	174.172	
Ubenide	Fred Randerok Duburima Dowabobo	168.685	
Ubenide	Eddie Nelson Scotty	144.013	
Ubenide	Royden Basil Hiram	139.373	
Ubenide	Invalid/blank votes	24	
Ubenide	Total votes cast	755	
Yaren	Anthony Audoa	121.370	Elected
Yaren	Ludwig Keke	104.063	Elected
Yaren	Pres Nimes Ekwona	98.735	
Yaren	John Daigon Akubor	83.123	
Yaren	Alfred Derangdedage Dick	63.993	
Yaren	Robert Rawate Kaierua, Snr.	60.777	
Yaren	Ikelani Ruthven Capelle	55.149	
Yaren	Alexius Morde Neneiya	50.683	
Yaren	Auwog Daniel Dabwadauw	49.095	
Yaren	Terence Bonowey Debao	47.928	
Yaren	Vitus Aloyisius Aboubo	47.190	
Yaren	Invalid/blank votes	9	
Yaren	Total votes cast	267	
Source: Republic of Nauru Government Gazette, 10 February 1997
