= 1995 Nauruan parliamentary election =

Parliamentary elections were held in Nauru on 18 November 1995. A record 67 candidates contested the 18 seats. All candidates ran as independents. Following the election Lagumot Harris was elected President by the Parliament, defeating incumbent Bernard Dowiyogo, who had been accused of squandering millions of dollars of royalties from phosphate mining (the cornerstone of Nauru's economy), by ten votes to seven.

Ruby Dediya, previously MP for Anetan/Ewa from 1986 to 1992, was returned to Parliament in the elections as its only female member.

== Results ==
| Party | Votes | % | Seats |
|---|---|---|---|
| Independents | 2,855 | 100.00 | 18 |
| Total | 2,855 | 100.00 | 18 |
| Valid votes | 2,855 | 96.88 | |
| Invalid/blank votes | 92 | 3.12 | |
| Total votes | 2,947 | 100.00 | |
| Registered voters/turnout | 2,952 | 99.83 | |
Source: Gazette, IDEA

=== By constituency ===
| Constituency | Candidate | Votes | Notes |
|---|---|---|---|
| Aiwo | René Harris | 172.848 | Elected |
| Aiwo | Godfrey Thoma | 106.491 | Elected |
| Aiwo | Theodore Conrad Moses | 106.033 | |
| Aiwo | David Libokimedo Agir | 100.395 | |
| Aiwo | Eston John Thoma | 86.285 | |
| Aiwo | Terence Angin Amram | 75.502 | |
| Aiwo | Richard Dugan Bill | 70.728 | |
| Aiwo | Pamela Eibudina Scriven | 69.896 | |
| Aiwo | Invalid/blank votes | 5 | |
| Aiwo | Total votes cast | 295 | |
| Anabar | Ludwig Scotty | 153.623 | Elected |
| Anabar | Maien Deireragea | 101.660 | Elected |
| Anabar | David Peter Gadaraoa | 89.663 | |
| Anabar | Rudolph Garoa | 82.290 | |
| Anabar | Godfrey Atsine Waidabu | 75.483 | |
| Anabar | Allison Deiye | 63.603 | |
| Anabar | Virginia Abraham | 55.964 | |
| Anabar | Invalid/blank votes | 14 | |
| Anabar | Total votes cast | 254 | |
| Anetan | Ruby Dediya | 128.300 | Elected |
| Anetan | Roy Degoregore | 118.829 | Elected |
| Anetan | Lawrence Stephen | 113.017 | |
| Anetan | Remy Namaduk | 105.831 | |
| Anetan | Gaiman Deireragea | 103.217 | |
| Anetan | Adago Deinuwea Bucky Ika | 99.383 | |
| Anetan | Nicholas Yanaw Duburiya | 93.723 | |
| Anetan | Invalid/blank votes | 5 | |
| Anetan | Total votes cast | 299 | |
| Boe | Kinza Clodumar | 169.560 | Elected |
| Boe | Clinton Benjamin | 138.093 | Elected |
| Boe | Baron Waqa | 131.562 | |
| Boe | Michael Aroi | 124.951 | |
| Boe | Tazio Gideon | 112.605 | |
| Boe | August Detonga Deiye | 108.096 | |
| Boe | Sam Ariedada Akaruwo | 80.342 | |
| Boe | Isaac Eobwaoin Aremwa | 73.383 | |
| Boe | Deiden Idarabwabwin Kiki | 73.187 | |
| Boe | Leslie James Dogida Adam | 69.276 | |
| Boe | Invalid/blank votes | 9 | |
| Boe | Total votes cast | 378 | |
| Buada | Vinson Detenamo | 154.417 | Elected |
| Buada | Ruben Kun | 131.583 | Elected |
| Buada | Tamaiti Willie Star | 124.333 | |
| Buada | Nelson De-Burma Tamakin | 102.167 | |
| Buada | Invalid/blank votes | 2 | |
| Buada | Total votes cast | 248 | |
| Meneng | Vinci Niel Clodumar | 199.408 | Elected |
| Meneng | Nimrod Botelanga | 157.611 | Elected |
| Meneng | Paul Denebaua Jeremiah | 153.935 | |
| Meneng | David Aingimea | 148.432 | |
| Meneng | Edwin Canon | 111.394 | |
| Meneng | David Audi Dabwido | 100.557 | |
| Meneng | Gononie Nemiah Kakiouea | 84.948 | |
| Meneng | Johnny Taumea | 82.596 | |
| Meneng | Ralph Steven | 82.047 | |
| Meneng | Alofa Foilape | 78.959 | |
| Meneng | Akeidu Adenoango Kepae | 77.560 | |
| Meneng | Invalid/blank votes | 18 | |
| Meneng | Total votes cast | 441 | |
| Ubenide | Derog Gioura | 268.664 | Elected |
| Ubenide | Bernard Dowiyogo | 263.272 | Elected |
| Ubenide | Lagumot Harris | 256.793 | Elected |
| Ubenide | Kennan Adeang | 213.999 | Elected |
| Ubenide | Buraro Detudamo | 211.402 | |
| Ubenide | Mark Dennis Kun | 189.246 | |
| Ubenide | Paul Lawrence Maginkieo Ribauw | 185.473 | |
| Ubenide | Alf Diringa Itsimaera | 168.928 | |
| Ubenide | Nelson Eddie Scotty | 155.782 | |
| Ubenide | Aloysius Iyomago Amwano | 150.680 | |
| Ubenide | Dempsey Keppa | 112.341 | |
| Ubenide | Charles Lanza Ratabwiy | 104.281 | |
| Ubenide | Invalid/blank votes | 28 | |
| Ubenide | Total votes cast | 768 | |
| Yaren | Anthony Audoa | 148.050 | Elected |
| Yaren | Pres Nimes Ekwona | 128.100 | Elected |
| Yaren | Ludwig Keke | 109.167 | |
| Yaren | John Daigon Akubor | 88.117 | |
| Yaren | Parry Hess Tekai Itaia | 87.967 | |
| Yaren | Moses Alexius Neneiya | 70.700 | |
| Yaren | Invalid/blank votes | 11 | |
| Yaren | Total votes cast | 269 | |
Source: Republic of Nauru Government Gazette, 20 November 1995
