= 1992 Nauruan parliamentary election =

1992 Parliamentary election in Nauru

Parliamentary elections were held in Nauru on 14 November 1992. All candidates ran as independents. Following the elections, Bernard Dowiyogo was re-elected President by the Parliament by ten votes to seven.

The only female member in the previous Parliament, Ruby Dediya (MP for Anetan/Ewa), lost her seat in the elections. The resulting Parliament was composed exclusively of men.

== Results ==
Party	Votes	%	Seats
Independents	2,474	100.00	18
Total	2,474	100.00	18
Valid votes	2,474	96.04	
Invalid/blank votes	102	3.96	
Total votes	2,576	100.00	
Source: Gazette, IPU, Nohlen et al.

=== By constituency ===
Constituency	Candidate	Votes	Notes
Aiwo	Theodore Conrad Moses	120.556	Elected
Aiwo	René Harris	119.223	Elected
Aiwo	Kinza Clodumar	117.055	
Aiwo	Darrel Gadabu	92.779	
Aiwo	John Akiki Agieman Thoma	84.610	
Aiwo	Amos Randall Cook	74.022	
Aiwo	Pamela Eobtsina Scriven	71.423	
Aiwo	Erickson Victor Idaga Daimon Caleb	70.117	
Aiwo	David Sylvester Simon	59.297	
Aiwo	Invalid/blank votes	10	
Aiwo	Total votes cast	296	
Anabar	Ludwig Scotty	109.467	Elected
Anabar	Maein Deireragea	100.883	Elected
Anabar	David Peter Gadaraoa	74.183	
Anabar	Obeira Menke	73.850	
Anabar	Alexander Rayham Deiye	65.900	
Anabar	Virginia Scotty	55.417	
Anabar	Invalid/blank votes	15	
Anabar	Total votes cast	212	
Anetan	Lawrence Stephen	107.86	Elected
Anetan	Roy Degoregore	107.61	Elected
Anetan	Ruby Thoma	99.899	
Anetan	Remy Namaduk	95.299	
Anetan	Adago Deinuwea Bucky Ika	75.469	
Anetan	Vassal Gadoengin	71.373	
Anetan	Haseldon Buraman	66.701	
Anetan	Rimone Tom	60.651	
Anetan	Jac Tevaki Fritz	56.328	
Anetan	Invalid/blank votes	13	
Anetan	Total votes cast	275	
Boe	Michael Aroi	130.027	Elected
Boe	Clinton Benjamin	123.774	Elected
Boe	Detonga August Deiye	113.120	
Boe	Tazio Gideon	98.862	
Boe	Remus Semisi Capelle	73.915	
Boe	Leslie Dogida Adam	71.403	
Boe	Cridden Alexius Appi	69.152	
Boe	Dale Richard Cecil Deriabaga	65.400	
Boe	Rantag Denton Harris	63.678	
Boe	Invalid/blank votes	6	
Boe	Total votes cast	292	
Buada	Vinson Detenamo	111.733	Elected
Buada	Tamaiti Willie Star	100.117	Elected
Buada	Rueben Kun	93.634	
Buada	Lyn Terangi Adam	83.503	
Buada	Rennie Angin Joseph Harris	71.350	
Buada	Alec Hindmarsh Stephen	71.133	
Buada	Invalid/blank votes	7	
Buada	Total votes cast	224	
Meneng	Vinci Niel Clodumar	173.699	Elected
Meneng	Paul Denebaua Jeremiah	151.145	Elected
Meneng	David Aingimea	124.958	
Meneng	Edwin Canon	108.901	
Meneng	Bobby Ralph Ingitebo Eoe	100.168	
Meneng	Adenoango Akeidu Kepae	90.082	
Meneng	Joshua Porthos Bop	89.124	
Meneng	Johnny Taumea	84.844	
Meneng	Carl Luckech Harris	79.49	
Meneng	Hamray Raymond Temaki	73.976	
Meneng	Ralph Steven	68.14	
Meneng	Invalid/blank votes	15	
Meneng	Total votes cast	394	
Ubenide	Buraro Detudamo	236.697	Elected
Ubenide	Bernard Dowiyogo	231.571	Elected
Ubenide	Derog Gioura	209.139	Elected
Ubenide	Kennan Adeang	192.073	Elected
Ubenide	Lagumot Harris	185.128	
Ubenide	Aloysius Arobaoit-Iyomogo Amwano	160.559	
Ubenide	Paul Lawrence Maginkieo Ribauw	138.405	
Ubenide	Francis Koonkie Garoa	109.615	
Ubenide	Russell Kun	102.310	
Ubenide	Charles Lanza Ratabwiy	96.415	
Ubenide	Dempsey Keppa	86.506	
Ubenide	Robin Wilson Tamakin	83.276	
Ubenide	Darcy Maiyauwe Phillip	79.564	
Ubenide	Invalid/blank votes	25	
Ubenide	Total votes cast	626	
Yaren	Pres Nimes Ekwona	130.179	Elected
Yaren	Ludwig Keke	105.010	Elected
Yaren	Anthony Kododo Detsimea Audoa	92.369	
Yaren	John Daigon Akubor	82.398	
Yaren	Parry Hess Tekai Itaia	80.410	
Yaren	Antonious Jimwereiy	76.936	
Yaren	Alfred Derangdedage Dick	70.543	
Yaren	Invalid/blank votes	11	
Yaren	Total votes cast	257	
Source: Republic of Nauru Government Gazette, 16 November 1992
