= 1963 Nauruan Local Government Council election =

Elections for the Local Government Council were held in Nauru in late 1963. All nine incumbent councillors were re-elected.

== Campaign ==
Of the eight constituencies, only two, Meneng and Anabar, were contested. The Meneng Constituency had two candidates, James Ategan Bop and James Aingimea, run for one open seat. The Anabar Constituency had three candidates, Agoko James Doguape, Jerry Ainungom Waidabu and Peter Gadaroa. In the other constituencies the sole candidates were elected unopposed.

== Results ==
Constituency	Elected member	Notes
Aiwo	Raymond Gadabu	Re-elected
Anabar	Agoko Doguape	Re-elected
Anetan	Roy Degoregore	Re-elected
Boe	Hammer DeRoburt	Re-elected
Buada	Austin Bernicke	Re-elected
Meneng	James Ategan Bop	Re-elected
Ubenide	Buraro Detudamo	Re-elected
Ubenide	Victor Eoaeo	Re-elected
Yaren	Joseph Detsimea Audoa	Re-elected
Source: Department of External Territories

== By-election ==
In December 1964, there was a by-election to fill a vacancy in the Local Government Council caused by the death of Councillor Raymond Gadabu. In the four-way contest, Edwin Tsitsi was elected.
