= 1959 Nauruan Local Government Council election =

Elections for the Local Government Council were held in Nauru in late 1959. Seven of the nine incumbent councillors were re-elected and Hammer DeRoburt was re-elected as Head Chief by the Council.

== Background ==
Of the eight constituencies, four of them had contested elections. The nominees in the remaining constituencies won by default. The following is a list of the nominees in the contested constituencies.

| Constituency | Nominees |
|---|---|
| Boe | Hammer DeRoburt |
| Boe | Adue Moses |
| Boe | Tamaiti Willie Star |
| Buada | Austin Bernicke |
| Buada | Totouwa Depaune |
| Meneng | James Aingimea |
| Meneng | Simeon Baguga |
| Meneng | James Ategan Bop |
| Meneng | Elliot Halstead |
| Meneng | Dibwet Jose |
| Ubenide | Buraro Robidok Detudamo |
| Ubenide | Idarabwabwin Victor Eoaeo |
| Ubenide | Jacob Dagabwinare |
| Ubenide | Dagabo Scotty |
| Ubenide | Simpson Scotty |

== Results ==
| Constituency | Elected member | Notes |
|---|---|---|
| Aiwo | Raymond Gadabu | Re-elected |
| Anabar | Agoko Doguape | Re-elected |
| Anetan | Roy Degoregore | Re-elected |
| Boe | Hammer DeRoburt | Re-elected |
| Buada | Austin Bernicke | Re-elected |
| Meneng | James Ategan Bop | |
| Ubenide | Buraro Detudamo | |
| Ubenide | Victor Eoaeo | Re-elected |
| Yaren | Joseph Detsimea Audoa | Re-elected |
Source: Department of External Territories
