= Nauru Phosphate Royalties Trust =

Sovereign wealth fund of Nauru

The Nauru Phosphate Royalties Trust (NPRT) was a sovereign wealth fund developed by the government of the Republic of Nauru in which the government invested money from the state-owned mining company, Nauru Phosphate Corporation. This money was then re-invested in a real estate portfolio, among other things, to provide the government with a reliable national income following the depletion of minable phosphates on the island. Although at one time successful, mismanagement and corruption later essentially bankrupted the fund, thus virtually bankrupting the entire Republic.

Responsibility for the Trust rests with the Ministry for the Nauru Phosphate Royalties Trust, a Cabinet position. At present, the office is exercised by the Nauruan Minister of Telecommunications Shadlog Bernicke.

== Beginnings ==
In 1970, the newly independent government of Nauru purchased the mining rights to the island's lucrative phosphate mines from their previous colonial ruler, Australia, for A$21 million. At the time, advisers to the Nauru Phosphate Corporation advised the government that the remaining phosphate reserves would last until 1996 at the rate of mining at the time.

The mines brought considerable wealth to the tiny island of Nauru, with the industry bringing in around A$100–120 million annually. Annual government expenditures amounted to around A$30 million, thus giving the republic around A$80 million per annum. This surplus was then added to the trust.

The NPRT was consisted of four funds: the Long-Term Investment Fund, the Land Owners' Royalty Trust Fund, the Housing Fund, and the Rehabilitation Fund. The Trust had sovereign immunity.

== The prime years ==
By 1991, the NPRT's value was estimated to be A$1.3 billion. These investments included properties in Australia, the Philippines, Guam, and the USA. A partial list of international investments includes:

- Fiji: The Grand Pacific Hotel
- India: Paradeep Phosphate
- New Zealand: Auckland Sheraton Hotel, Rotorua Sheraton Hotel
- Philippines: Pacific Star Building, Manila Pacific Star Hotel, Philippines Phosphate & Fertilisers
- Contiguous United States: Pacific House (Washington), Singer Building Development (665 acres - Houston), Hillside Property (600 acres - Oregon)
- Hawaii: Nauru Tower, Hawaiki Tower
- Guam: Pacific Star Hotel
- United Kingdom: 3 Chesham Street (London)
- Samoa: Properties at Vaitele and Sogi
- Australia: Nauru House (Melbourne) -- (this development was known as the "jewel in the crown" of Nauru's overseas properties)

== Mismanagement ==
Citizens and government officials flaunted the wealth of the tiny Pacific island as if it were endless (leading to bad investments such as the notorious Leonardo the Musical: A Portrait of Love). This led to high external representation and excessive official overseas travel (that included golf in the Bahamas) which blew out budgets year after year so that the government began to borrow money to supplement its huge spending. The public service had over 1,500 employees (in a country with a population less than 10,000) and the government ran deficits of A$10 million in the 1990s.

Eventually, more than A$200 million was borrowed. In order to consolidate this debt and pay interest, the government took out a A$240 million loan from General Electric's Capital Division, which was levied against the nation's international real estate portfolio.

== Downfall ==
The virtual end of mining on Nauru paired with running budget deficits made it very difficult for Nauru to pay its debts. In 2003, the mines closed. Compared to its 1991 estimated value of A$1.3 billion, the NPRT was estimated to be worth only A$300 million by 2004. International creditors were not receiving payments, then seizing rights to Nauru's entire real estate portfolio, and even seizing the sole aircraft of Air Nauru.

In 1993, the Australian secretary of the NPRT, resigned. In his resignation letter, he claimed that various Nauru government organizations kept bleeding the trusts, and there were declining earnings as a result of over-investment in foreign real estate.

The Grand Pacific Hotel in Fiji closed in 1992 and was only reopened in 2014.

Receivers began to start selling off the NPRT's assets in Australia. Nauru House in Melbourne, which was considered to be the most valuable real estate asset of the NPRT, was sold in 2004 to help pay off Nauru's debts to GE Capital.

Air Nauru also had their aircraft seized. In December 2005, Air Nauru's only aircraft at the time, a Boeing 737-400 was seized by the US Export-Import Bank after failing to make payments since 2002. This left Nauru without any airline service.

== "The paradox" ==
In 1962, well before Nauru took over the phosphate industry and achieved independence, the United Nations offered a cautious note:

The problem of Nauru presents a paradox. The striking contrast is between a superficially happy state of affairs and an uncertain and indeed alarming future... But this picture of peace and well-being and security is deceptive. Indeed it is a false paradise. For these gentle people are dominated by the knowledge that the present happy state of affairs cannot continue.

== Ministers responsible for Nauru Phosphate Royalties Trust ==
N	Name	Took office	Left office	Source
1	Buraro Detudamo	January 1962	December 1976	
2	Kinza Clodumar	December 1976	April 1978	
3	Ruben Kun	April 1978	May 1978	
4	Derog Gioura	May 1978	December 1986	
5	Vinson Detenamo	December 1986	December 1989	
Unknown/not fully documented (1989-1999)
6	Remy Namaduk	1999	March 2000	
7	Ludwig Scotty	March 2000	May 2003	
8	David Adeang	May 2003	August 2003	
9	Baron Waqa	April 2004	December 2004	
10	Kieren Keke	December 2004	November 2019	
11	Lionel Aingimea	2019	2022	
12	Timothy Ika	2022	2023	
13	Shadlog Bernicke	2023	Incumbent	

== See also ==
- Phosphate mining in Nauru
- Economy of Nauru
- Nauru Phosphate Corporation
- Republic of Nauru
- Tuvalu Trust Fund
