= Totouwa Depaune =

Nauruan politician

The Honourable Totouwa Depaune MP

Member of the Nauruan Parliament for Buada
- In office 1968–1971
- Preceded by: Constituency established
- Succeeded by: Ruben Kun
- In office 1977–1983
- Preceded by: Austin Bernicke
- Succeeded by: Vinson Detenamo

Personal details
- Born: 1923 or 1924
- Died: 27 May 1986 (aged 62)

Totouwa Depaune (1923 or 1924 – 27 May 1986) was a Nauruan politician. He served as minister of public works and community services in 1978.

== Biography ==
Totouwa Depaune was born in either 1923 or 1924. A 1952 census describes Depaune as a married Protestant, working as a welding foreman. He was of the Iruwa tribe.

In 1951, Depaune was elected to the first Nauru Local Government Council to represent the Buada District. He was not re-elected in 1955. He unsuccessfully ran for the Local Government Council in 1959. In 1967, Depaune was elected to the Nauru Constitutional Convention.

Depaune was elected to the first Parliament of Nauru in 1968 to represent the Buada Constituency. He was unseated by Ruben Kun in the 1971 election. By 1972, Depaune was serving as member of the Police Service Board. He served in this position until 1977. He unsuccessfully ran for parliament in 1973 and 1976. MP Austin Bernicke died in 1977. Depaune was elected in a subsequent by-election held on 5 March 1977. Depaune was re-elected in the November 1977 election. He was appointed minister of public works and community services by President Hammer DeRoburt on 12 May 1978. In December 1978, following a cabinet reshuffle by President DeRoburt, Depaune was replaced as public works minister by Lagumot Harris. Depaune was re-elected in 1980. He did not run in 1983.

Depaune died on 27 May 1986.
