= 1966 Nauruan parliamentary election =

Elections for the Legislative Council for the Territory of Nauru were held for the first and only time on 22 January 1966.

== Background ==
Nauru had been under Australian administration since World War II. In 1962 the United Nations General Assembly voted by 80 –0 that the island should be granted independence. The United Nations Trusteeship Council subsequently requested that the Australian government set up a Legislative Council. The Parliament of Australia passed the Nauru Act 1965, which established the Legislative Council for the Territory of Nauru. The new body had fifteen members, comprising nine elected members, one ex officio member (the Administrator), and five "official members" (appointed by the Governor-General of Australia on the nomination of the Administrator).

== Electoral system ==
The electoral system remained the same as for the Local Government Council; the fourteen districts of Nauru were grouped into eight constituencies. Seven constituencies elected one member, whilst one elected two. A total of 24 candidates stood for the nine seats.

== Results ==
Hammer DeRoburt (Boe constituency) and Roy Degoregore (Anetan and Ewa) were both elected unopposed. All elected candidates had previously been members of the Local Government Council at some point.

Constituency	Elected members
Aiwo	Samuel Tsitsi
Anabar	James Doguape
Anetan	Roy Degoregore
Boe	Hammer DeRoburt
Buada	Austin Bernicke
Meneng	James Ategan Bop
Ubenide	Buraro Detudamo
Ubenide	Victor Eoaeo
Yaren	Joseph Detsimea Audoa
Source: Viviani

== Aftermath ==
The new Legislative Council was opened by Australian Minister for the Territories Charles Barnes on 31 January 1966, which marked the twentieth anniversary of the return to Nauru of survivors of the World War II deportation of islanders during the Japanese occupation. Hammer DeRoburt was re-elected as Head Chief by the council after the elections.

Victor Eoaeo resigned from the Legislative Council on 30 November 1967.
