= 1967 Nauruan Constitutional Convention election =

Constitutional Convention elections were held in Nauru on 16 December 1967. The convention was established by the Nauru Legislative Council as a result of the Australian government passing the Nauru Independence Act 1967, which allowed for Nauru's independence and the end of its status as a United Nations trust territory administered by Australia.

== Background ==
The Constitutional Convention consisted of 27 elected members and the nine elected members of the Legislative Council. A total of 96 candidates contested the 27 elected seats. There were fewer than 1,000 registered voters.

== Results ==
There were 945 total votes in the election with 82 of those votes being invalid.

Constituency	Elected members
Aiwo	Itubwa Amram
Aiwo	Deidienak Anako Daniel
Aiwo	John Cole Darabana Bill
Anabar	Ainungom Jerry Waidabu
Anabar	David Peter Gadaraoa
Anabar	James Tagamoun Abawo
Anetan	Asa Paul Diema Denagabwida
Boe	Kenas Aroi
Boe	Alexander Deraoadi Deiye
Boe	Moniba Star
Buada	Vincent Detenamo
Buada	Totouwa Depaune
Buada	Tamaiti Star
Meneng	Audi Dabwido
Meneng	Bobby Ingitebo Ralph Eoe
Meneng	Dibwet Jose
Ubenide	Victor Eoaeo
Ubenide	Lagumot Harris
Ubenide	Paul Lawrence Maginkieo Ribauw
Ubenide	Kennan Adeang Diereragea
Ubenide	Dagabwinere Jacob
Ubenide	Gioura Derog
Yaren	Ludwig Keke
Yaren	Alfred Dick
Yaren	John Akubor
Source: Government Gazette

== Aftermath ==
The 36 members of the Convention met for the first time on 3 January 1968, with the purpose of drawing up a new constitution in preparation for independence later in the year.

Several issues were debated during the Convention's sitting, including whether the death penalty should be expressly banned by the new constitution (rejected by 26 votes to 8), whether the government should have the power to levy taxes (passed by 17 votes to 15), whether religious schools should be fully funded by the state (defeated by 15 votes to 12), and whether there should be an increase in the royalties from phosphate mining (passed by 14 votes to 12 but later overturned by a vote of 18 to 8).

On 29 January 1968 the Convention approved the new constitution unanimously. It provided for an 18-member Legislative Assembly with a three-year term. The Assembly would then appoint a five-member Council of State to exercise executive power.
