= Ludwig Keke =

Nauruan politician

The Honourable Ludwig Keke MP
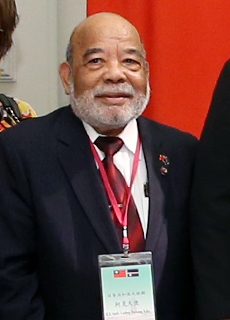
- Keke in 2016

Ambassador of Nauru to Taiwan
- In office 2007–2016
- Preceded by: Position established
- Succeeded by: Chitra Jeremiah

Speaker of the Parliament of Nauru
- In office 12 December 1998 – 12 April 2000
- Preceded by: Kennan Adeang
- Succeeded by: Ludwig Scotty

Member of the Nauruan Parliament for Yaren
- In office 1968–1972
- In office 1989–1995
- In office 1997–2000

Personal details
- Born: Ludwig Dowong c. 1935 (age 90–91) Nauru
- Spouse: Ann Elizabeth Buissink (m. 1969)
- Children: 2, including Kieren
- Education: Waverley College; Central Medical School; Queensland University; University of Otago

Ludwig Dowong Keke (born Ludwig Dowong; born c. 1935) is a Nauruan politician, diplomat, and dentist. Keke was Nauru's first university graduate. He worked as a dentist in Australia before returning to Nauru to enter politics by 1967, first being elected to the Constitutional Convention, and then to the Legislative Assembly. He served in the parliament until 1972. After 1977, he served as a dental officer in Western Australia. He then served as a dental officer for the South Pacific Commission in 1981. He returned to Nauru and served three terms in the parliament between 1986 and 2000, serving as speaker of parliament in his final term. By 2004, he was a diplomat to Fiji, and in 2007 he became the first Nauruan ambassador to Taiwan. He served in that capacity until 2016.

== Early life and education ==
Ludwig Dowong was born around 1935. During World War II, during the Japanese occupation of Nauru, Dowong was one of the Nauruans taken to the Truk Islands. Dowong received a secondary education in Sydney, Australia. In 1950, Dowong began attending Waverley College in Sydney. He graduated with the class of 1954. He went on to graduate from the Central Medical School in Suva, Fiji, with a dental surgery diploma. In 1961, he worked as an assistant dental officer in Brisbane. He then studied at Queensland University, where he later graduated with a Bachelor of Dental Science. Dowong was Nauru's first university graduate. By 1966, Dowong begun working as a dentist in Brisbane. By 1977, he had earned a Diploma of Dental Public Health from the University of Otago in New Zealand.

== Career ==
By 1967, Ludwig Dowong had returned to Nauru. In 1967, he was elected to the Constitutional Convention. After independence, Ludwig Dowong had taken his father's surname, Keke. In 1968, Keke was elected to the Nauruan Legislative Assembly, representing the Yaren Constituency. In the election, he defeated the first female parliamentary candidate in Nauru, his sister Liebon Sunshine Keke. Keke was re-elected to the Parliament of Nauru in the 1971 election. Keke was defeated by Alfred Derangdedage Dick in a by-election in June 1972.

On 30 September 1977, Keke was registered as a dentist in Western Australia. He was later appointed as Regional Dental Officer with the Western Australian Department of Health. In 1981, Keke was appointed as Dental Public Health Officer with the South Pacific Commission. He was the first Nauruan to hold the position.

Keke unsuccessfully ran for the Yaren parliamentary seat in the 1986 and 1987 elections. Keke was elected in the 1989 election, and re-elected in the 1992 election. Keke was defeated in his attempt at re-election in the 1995 election. He was re-elected in the 1997 election. Keke had served as deputy speaker of the parliament. He served as speaker of parliament 12 December 1998 to 12 April 2000.

By 2004, Keke was serving as High Commissioner of Nauru to Fiji. In 2007, Keke became the first ambassador of Nauru to Taiwan. He presented his credentials to Taiwanese President Chen Shui-bian on 7 March. On 8 April 2016, Taiwanese President Ma Ying-jeou awarded Keke with the Order of Brilliant Star. Keke was succeeded by Chitra Jeremiah in July of that year.

== Personal life ==
Ludwig Keke's brother, Leo Keke, was the first lawyer from Nauru. On 19 July 1969, Keke married Ann Elizabeth Buissink, an Australian woman of Dutch origin. Together they have two sons, Kristian and Kieren. Kieren Keke is also a Nauruan politician, who served as foreign minister. Kristian is a senior pilot at All Nippon Airways.
