= Roy Degoregore =

Nauruan politician

The Honourable Roy Degoregore MP

Member of the Nauruan Parliament for Anetan
- In office 1968–1980
- Preceded by: Constituency established
- Succeeded by: Lawrence Stephen
- In office 1983–1996
- Preceded by: Bucky Ika
- Succeeded by: Remy Namaduk

Personal details
- Born: 6 February 1922
- Died: 24 August 1996 (aged 74) Melbourne, Australia

Roy Demanganuwe Degoregore (Note: Last name sometimes spelled "Degorogore", middle name sometimes spelled "Demanwe".) (6 February 1922 – 24 August 1996) was a Nauruan politician.

== Biography ==
Roy Degoregore was born on 6 February 1922. He was of the Eamwit tribe. He was on Nauru during the Japanese occupation of World War II. A 1952 census describes Degoregore as an unmarried Roman Catholic, working as a clerk for the British Phosphate Commission.

Degoregore was elected to the first Nauru Local Government Council in 1951 to represent the Anetan and Ewa districts. He was re-elected in 1955, 1959 (unopposed), and 1963 (unopposed). He was elected unopposed to the Legislative Council in 1966.

Degoregore was elected to the first Parliament of Nauru in 1968. He represented the Anetan Constituency. He was re-elected in 1971, 1973, 1976 (unopposed), and 1977. On 19 April 1978, President Lagumot Harris appointed Degoregore as minister of health and education. Degoregore lost re-election in the 1980 election. Degoregore was once again elected in 1983. He would be re-elected in 1986, 1987, 1989, 1992, and 1995. On 22 November 1995, President Harris appointed Degoregore minister of works and community services.

Degoregore died of cancer in Melbourne on 24 August 1996. In a by-election following his death, Remy Namaduk was elected to parliament.
