= Parcelle Bop =

Nauruan politician

The Honourable Parcelle Bop MP

Member of the Nauruan Parliament for Meneng
- In office 1984–1986
- Preceded by: James Ategan Bop
- Succeeded by: Paul Denabuawa Jeremiah

Personal details
- Born: c. 1947
- Died: 23 October 2013 (aged 66)

Parcelle James Dedagunmon Bop (c. 1947 – 23 October 2013) was a Nauruan politician.

== Biography ==
Bop was born around 1947. He was a member of the Iruwa tribe.

In the 1983 parliamentary election, James Ategan Bop was elected to represent the Meneng Constituency. He died in office in July 1984. As a result, on 25 August 1984, a by-election was held in the constituency. Parcelle Bop was elected, having received 74 first preference votes. In 1985, Bop attended a conference of the Commonwealth Parliamentary Association held in Regina, Saskatchewan, Canada. Bop unsuccessfully sought re-election in 1986. He again unsuccessfully ran in the 1987 election.

In November 2009, Bop was appointed to the Board of Directors of the Nauru Phosphate Royalties Trust.

Bop died on 23 October 2013.
