= David Peter Gadaraoa =

Nauruan politician (born 1944)

The Honourable David Peter Gadaraoa MP

Speaker of the Parliament of Nauru
- In office January 1977 – September 1981
- Preceded by: Edwin Tsitsi
- Succeeded by: Ruben Kun

Member of the Nauruan Parliament for Anabar
- In office 1968–1981
- Preceded by: Constituency established
- Succeeded by: Maein Deireragea

Personal details
- Born: 1944 (age 81–82)

David Peter Gadaraoa (born 1944) is a Nauruan politician.

== Biography ==
David Peter Gadaraoa was born in 1944.

In 1967, Gadaraoa was elected to serve on the Nauruan Constitutional Convention. Gadaraoa was elected to the Parliament of Nauru representing the Anabar Constituency in the 1968 election. He was re-elected unopposed in 1971. He was again re-elected in 1973. In December 1973, Gadaraoa was elected deputy speaker under Speaker Kenas Aroi. Gadaraoa defeated Lagumot Harris by one vote.

Gadaraoa was re-elected in 1976. Gadaraoa was elected speaker of Parliament in January 1977 following the resignation of Speaker Edwin Tsitsi in December 1976. Gadaraoa was re-elected to parliament in 1977. He was re-elected as speaker in November. He was again re-elected unopposed to parliament in 1980. He was re-elected as speaker as well. Gadaraoa resigned his parliamentary seat in September 1981 for personal reasons.

Gadaraoa ran unsuccessfully for parliament in the Anabar Constituency in the following elections: 1983, 1987, 1992, 1995, 1997, 2000, 2003, 2007, 2008, April 2010, and June 2010.
