= President Kun =

President Kun may refer to:

- Ruben Kun (1942–2014), 6th president of Nauru
- Russ Kun (born 1975), 16th president of Nauru
