= President Adeang =

President Adeang may refer to:

- Kennan Adeang (1942–2011), president of Nauru (1986, 1986, 1996)
- David Adeang (b. 1969), president of Nauru (2023–present)
