= Gioura (surname) =

Gioura is a Nauruan surname. Notable individuals with the surname include:

- Gabrissa Gioura Hartman (born 1975), Nauruan politician
- Derog Gioura (1932–2008), Nauruan politician and acting president of Nauru
