= Wanganeen Emiu =

Nauruan politician

The Honourable Wanganeen Emiu MP

Member of the Nauruan Parliament for Boe
- Incumbent
- Assumed office 2025
- Preceded by: Martin Hunt

Personal details
- Born: 21 September 1993 (age 32)

Wanganeen Zac Emiu (born 21 September 1993) is a Nauruan politician.

== Biography ==
Wanganeen Emiu was born on 21 September 1993. He is of the Iruwa tribe. He received a scholarship to attend Nauru Secondary School in 2007. Emiu became engaged to Angelita Detudamo of the Uaboe District on 20 June 2015. The couple married on 31 July.

Emiu unsuccessfully ran for parliament in the Boe Constituency in the 2022 election. Emiu was elected to parliament in the 2025 election.
