= 1968 Nauruan parliamentary election =

Elections for a Legislative Assembly were held in Nauru on 26 January 1968, following passage of the Nauru Independence Act 1967 which granted Nauru independence from Australia with effect from 31 January 1968.

== Background ==
A Constitutional Convention was elected in 1967 and produced a new constitution in preparation for independence, which provided for an 18-member Legislative Assembly with a three-year term. The Assembly would then appoint a five-member Council of State to exercise executive power.

== Results ==
Of the 18 elected members, half consisted of the nine members of the Legislative Council elected in 1966.

== Aftermath ==
The Assembly met for the first time on 31 January and elected the new five-member Council of State. Seven candidates were nominated for the contest, although Victor Eoaeo pulled out as he continued to oppose Nauruan independence. The Council subsequently elected Hammer DeRoburt as its chairman.

Election for the Council of State
Candidate	Votes	Results
Austin Bernicke	17	Elected
Hammer DeRoburt	17	Elected
Buraro Detudamo	16	Elected
Joseph Detsimea Audoa	13	Elected
James Ategan Bop	12	Elected
Samuel Tsitsi	10	Not Elected

On 17 May the Assembly elected the first President. Bernicke, DeRoburt and Detudamo were all nominated. However, Bernicke and Detudamo both declined their nominations, resulting in DeRoburt being elected unopposed. He then formed a new cabinet, with Bernicke as Minister for Health and Education, Bop as Minister for Finance, Detsimea as Minister for Justice and Detudamo as Minister for Works.
