= David Agir =

Nauruan politician

The Honourable David Agir MP

Member of the Nauruan Parliament for Aiwo
- In office 10 March 1979 – 5 December 1983
- Preceded by: Kinza Clodumar
- Succeeded by: Kinza Clodumar

Personal details
- Born: 12 July 1942 Nauru
- Died: 6 September 2003 (aged 61) Nauru

David Libokomedo Agir (12 July 1942 – 6 September 2003) was a Nauruan politician.

== Political role ==
Standing for Aiwo Constituency, Agir was elected to the Parliament of Nauru, in a by-election following Kinza Clodumar's resignation in 1979.

Four years later, Agir lost his seat again to Clodumar.

== Later life ==
In his later years Agir worked for the Department for Island Development and Industries.

== See also ==
- Politics of Nauru
- Elections in Nauru
