= Department of Finance (Nauru) =

Ministry of Finance

Agency overview
- Jurisdiction: Nauru
- Headquarters: Nauru
- Agency executive: David Adeang, Minister
- Parent agency: Government of Nauru
- Website: naurufinance.info

The Department of Finance is a ministry in Nauru responsible for overseeing and coordinating effective management of public finance and resources in Nauru. One of the divisions of the ministry is responsible for preparing annual budget. The ministry is led by minister of finance appointed by President of Nauru. The current minister of finance is President David Adeang.

== Ministers of finance ==
Name	President	Took office	Left office
James Ategan Bop	Hammer DeRoburt	January 1968	December 1976
Kinza Clodumar	Bernard Dowiyogo	January 1977	January 1978
Kenas Aroi	Bernard Dowiyogo	January 1978	January 1978
Ruben Kun	Bernard Dowiyogo	January 1978	April 1978
Ruben Kun	Lagumot Harris	April 1978	May 1978
James Ategan Bop	Hammer DeRoburt	May 1978	December 1978
Buraro Detudamo	Hammer DeRoburt	December 1978	April 1979
Kenas Aroi	Hammer DeRoburt	April 1979	September 1986
Kinza Clodumar	Kennan Adeang	September 1986	October 1986
Kenas Aroi	Hammer DeRoburt	October 1986	December 1986
Kennan Adeang	Kennan Adeang	December 1986	December 1986
Kinza Clodumar	Hammer DeRoburt	December 1986	August 1989
Kennan Adeang	Kenas Aroi	August 1989	December 1989
Kinza Clodumar	Bernard Dowiyogo	December 1989	September 1993
Vinci Niel Clodumar	Bernard Dowiyogo	September 1993	June 1994
Vinson Detenamo	Bernard Dowiyogo	June 1994	November 1995
Ruben Kun	Lagumot Harris	November 1995	November 1996
Kinza Clodumar	Bernard Dowiyogo	November 1996	November 1996
Ruby Dediya	Kennan Adeang	November 1996	December 1996
Lagumot Harris	Ruben Kun	December 1996	February 1997
Kinza Clodumar	Kinza Clodumar	February 1997	June 1998
Bernard Dowiyogo	Bernard Dowiyogo	June 1998	August 1998
Ruben Kun	Bernard Dowiyogo	August 1998	December 1998
Derog Gioura	Bernard Dowiyogo	December 1998	April 1999
Kinza Clodumar	René Harris	April 1999	June 1999
Anthony Audoa	René Harris	June 1999	October 1999
Remy Namaduk	René Harris	October 1999	March 2000
Nimrod Botelanga	René Harris	March 2000	April 2000
Bernard Dowiyogo	Bernard Dowiyogo	April 2000	May 2000
Kinza Clodumar	Bernard Dowiyogo	May 2000	August 2000
Remy Namaduk	Bernard Dowiyogo	August 2000	March 2001
Vassal Gadoengin	Bernard Dowiyogo	March 2001	March 2001
Aloysius Amwano	René Harris	March 2001	May 2001
Remy Namaduk	René Harris	May 2001	May 2001
Nimrod Botelanga	René Harris	May 2001	June 2001
Aloysius Amwano	René Harris	June 2001	January 2003
Remy Namaduk	Bernard Dowiyogo	January 2003	January 2003
Aloysius Amwano	René Harris	January 2003	January 2003
Remy Namaduk	Bernard Dowiyogo	January 2003	March 2003
Remy Namaduk	Derog Gioura	March 2003	April 2003
Dogabe Jeremiah	Derog Gioura	April 2003	May 2003
David Adeang	Ludwig Scotty	May 2003	June 2003
Kieren Keke	Ludwig Scotty	June 2003	August 2003
Marcus Stephen	René Harris	August 2003	March 2004
Kinza Clodumar	René Harris	March 2004	May 2004
Nimrod Botelanga	René Harris	May 2004	June 2004
Kinza Clodumar	Ludwig Scotty	June 2004	August 2004
Marcus Stephen	Ludwig Scotty	August 2004	November 2005
Ludwig Scotty	Ludwig Scotty	November 2005	September 2006
Frederick Pitcher	Ludwig Scotty	September 2006	December 2007
Frederick Pitcher	Marcus Stephen	December 2007	January 2008
Kieren Keke	Marcus Stephen	January 2008	February 2011
Roland Kun	Marcus Stephen	February 2011	July 2011
Mathew Batsiua	Marcus Stephen	July 2011	November 2011
Kieren Keke	Frederick Pitcher	November 2011	November 2011
David Adeang	Sprent Dabwido	November 2011	June 2012
Roland Kun	Sprent Dabwido	June 2012	June 2013
David Adeang	Baron Waqa	June 2013	August 2019
Martin Hunt	Lionel Aingimea	August 2019	September 2022
Martin Hunt	Russ Kun	September 2022	October 2023
David Adeang	David Adeang	October 2023	Incumbent

== See also ==
- Government of Nauru
- Economy of Nauru
