= Kieren Keke =

Nauruan politician

The Honourable Kieren Keke MP
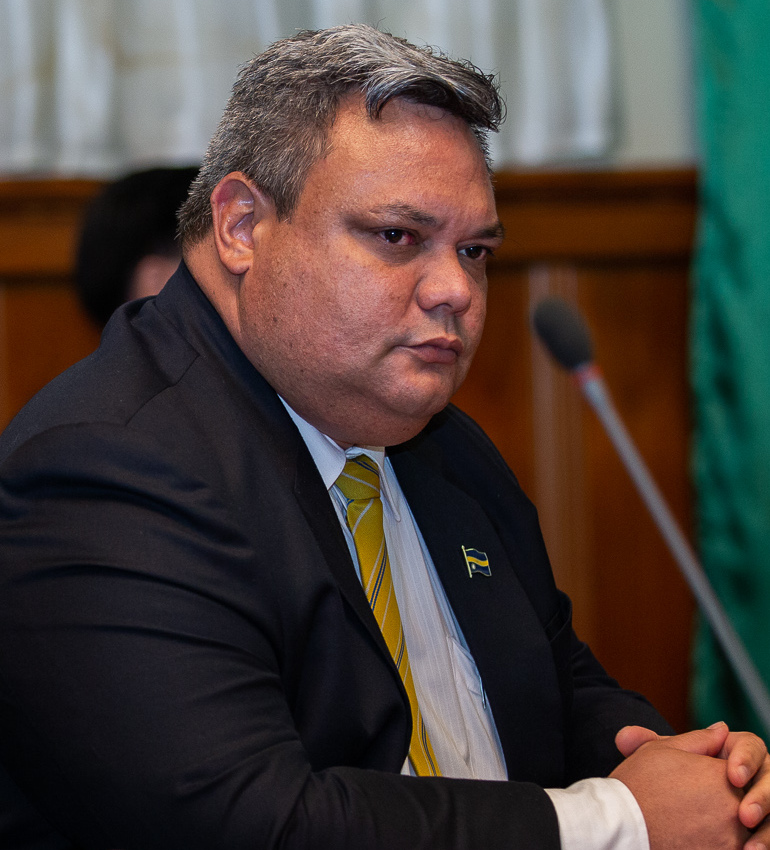

Member of the Nauruan Parliament for Yaren
- Incumbent
- Assumed office 2003
- Preceded by: Anthony Audoa

Personal details
- Born: 27 June 1971 (age 55) Yaren District, Nauru
- Party: Naoero Amo
- Profession: medical doctor

Kieren Aedogan Ankwong Keke (born 27 June 1971) is a Nauruan politician and medical doctor. He is a member of the Parliament of Nauru and former Minister of Finance and Minister of Foreign Affairs.

== Background ==
He is currently a leading figure of the Nauru First (Naoero Amo) party, and one of the few medical professionals on the island (others are Dr. Mark Kun, Dr. Ludwig Keke—Kieren's father, a dentist— Dr. Godfrey Waidabu, who now lives in the Marshall Islands, and Dr. Kiki Thoma). He was Minister of Finance in the cabinet of Ludwig Scotty in 2003.

In 2004, he was not allowed to take his parliamentary seat. The speaker of Parliament, Russell Kun claimed that Keke, having Australian nationality as well as Nauruan, could not sit in Parliament. Keke was also arrested along with Baron Waqa, David Adeang and Fabian Ribauw in April 2004 and charged with sedition after a protest at Nauru's airport, but the charges were soon dropped. The charges were dropped following a resolution of Parliament moved by Keke and others charged that the charges be dropped. The DPP was not consulted by the Parliament and the motion was in contravention of the Constitution and the Rule of Law. Keke was reelected to Parliament in October 2004 and retained his post as health minister.

Keke resigned from the government, along with Frederick Pitcher and Roland Kun, in late 2007 over allegations of misconduct on the part of Adeang and Scotty's unwillingness to act against Adeang. He led the opposition to Scotty in a no-confidence motion on 13 November 2007; although a majority of those voting supported the motion (eight in favour, seven opposed), it fell short of the necessary nine votes.

== Stephen Administration ==
=== 2007 ===
After Scotty was ousted in another vote on 19 December and Marcus Stephen (a cousin of Kieren Keke) was elected president, Keke was named Minister of Foreign Affairs, Telecommunications, and Transport and Minister Assisting the President of Nauru

Keke had previously been regarded as a reformist, both through his participation in the Administration of Ludwig Scotty, and because of the reformist discourse of the Nauru First Party, of which Keke is a prominent member. The outgoing Scotty Administration, which had won a landslide election victory only weeks before Keke and others resigned and participated in successive votes of no confidence, enjoyed wide popular support, and was broadly seen in the years 2004–2007 as offering a stable contrast to a previous period of very frequent use of the vote of no confidence, when governments would fall over issues which sometimes reflected relations between personalities rather than the exigencies of the wider national interest. Others would argue that allegations against former minister David Adeang, around which the November and December 2007 no-confidence votes against President Ludwig Scotty were centred, constituted an issue important enough to justify the use of such a Parliamentary device, with its far-reaching consequences.

=== 2008 ===
In 2008, Keke's Foreign Affairs department was preparing for the June 2008 meeting of the International Whaling Commission in Santiago, Chile, owing to Nauru's interest in whaling issues as a Pacific maritime nation and in the related issue of tuna fishing stocks, given the country's tuna fishing activities. The change of stance on whaling adopted by the government of Australia was likely to cause resonances for Keke's Department.

In February 2008 Keke announced that the Nauruan Government was studying the possibility of developing service and maintenance facilities for fishing vessels from countries in the region.

In March 2008, the Speaker of the Parliament of Nauru, David Adeang, attempted to have Keke expelled from Parliament, by summoning a Parliamentary session, allegedly without informing members of the government, which resulted in the passing of a law forbidding Members of Parliament to hold dual citizenship. President Stephen argued that the law was unconstitutional; Adeang said it was not. On 28 March, Adeang ordered Keke and another minister, Frederick Pitcher, to vacate their seats in Parliament, since they both hold dual Nauruan and Australian citizenship. The two ministers refused to do so, and Adeang suspended the sitting.

In April 2008 Keke was reelected to the Parliament of Nauru and was retained as a leading member of the Administration of President Marcus Stephen. He was again reelected in 2010.

Keke was replaced as Foreign Minister by Matthew Batsiua on 10 November 2011.

== Dabwido Administration ==
Sprent Dabwido was elected president in November 2011 after the resignation of President Marcus Stephen and removal of President Freddie Pitcher. Keke was initially opposed to this administration, but in May 2012 Dabwido dismissed his entire cabinet and replaced them with opposition members. Keke was reinstated as Minister of Foreign Affairs.

Keke was the representative of the Alliance of Small Island States at the 2012 United Nations Climate Change Conference, and expressed his disappointment at the outcome, describing it as "words" without "action".

On 7 February 2013, Keke resigned from all his government portfolios (Foreign Affairs, Trade, Health and Sport), without offering a public explanation.

Keke was re-elected to Parliament in the elections held in 2013.

== See also ==
- 2008 Nauruan parliamentary election
- Political families of Nauru
- Politics of Nauru
