= Austin Bernicke =

Nauruan politician

- Bernicke with a new Nauruan passport in 1968

Minister for Health and Education
- In office 1968–1976
- Succeeded by: Lawrence Stephen

Member of Parliament
- In office 1966–1977
- Constituency: Buada

Member of the Local Government Council
- In office 1951–

Personal details
- Born: Nauru
- Died: 13 January 1977 (aged 68) Nauru

Austin Bernicke (died 13 January 1977) was a Nauruan politician. He was a member of the first Local Government Council in 1951, then a member of Parliament after it was established in 1966, serving until his death in 1977. He also served as a cabinet minister from 1968 until 1976.

== Biography ==
Bernicke was a member of the Eamwitmwit tribe. He became the first Nauruan to attend university when he began studying medicine at Queen's College at the University of Melbourne. He returned to Nauru to work as a pathologist, later becoming superintendent of Nauru Hospital. Bernicke contested the first elections to the Local Government Council in 1951 and was elected from the Denigomodu, Nibok, Uaboe and Baiti constituency. He later became the council's secretary.

In 1966 Bernicke was elected to the new Legislative Council in the Buada Constituency. He was also elected to the Constitutional Convention the following year and was elected Deputy Chairman of the body. After being re-elected to a renamed Legislative Assembly in 1968, he was nominated as a candidate for the presidency, but declined. However, he was elected to the Council of State, becoming Minister for Health and Education. The Legislative Assembly became Parliament upon independence later in the year.

Bernicke was re-elected in 1971 and 1973, retaining his ministerial portfolio following both elections. Although he was re-elected again in 1976, he was excluded from the new cabinet. He died in January 1977 at the age of 68. His grandson Shadlog Bernicke later became an MP.
