= Edwin Tsitsi =

Nauruan politician

The Honourable Edwin Tsitsi MP

Speaker of the Parliament of Nauru
- In office 22 December 1976 – 30 December 1976
- Preceded by: Kenas Aroi
- Succeeded by: David Gadaraoa

Member of the Nauruan Parliament for Aiwo
- In office 31 January 1968 – 30 December 1976
- Preceded by: Position established
- Succeeded by: René Harris

Personal details
- Born: 17 January 1925 Nauru
- Died: 20 May 1997 (aged 72)

Samuel Edwin Tsitsi (17 January 1925 – 20 May 1997) was a Nauruan politician.

== Biography ==
Tsitsi was born on 17 January 1925. His father was Samuel Tsitsi. He was a member of the Eamwidara tribe. In 1939, he entered the medical service as an apprentice in a pharmacy in Sydney, Australia. In 1954, again in Sydney, he trained to become a pharmacist.

In December 1964, there was a by-election to fill a vacancy in the Nauruan Local Government Council caused by the death of Councillor Raymond Gadabu. In the four-way election, Tsitsi was elected. In 1966, Tsitsi was elected to the Legislative Assembly and re-elected to the Local Government Council. He represented the Aiwo district in both.

In 1968, Tsitsi was elected to the first parliament of Nauru. He was nominated for Council of State, but failed election. Tsitsi was re-elected to parliament in 1971, 1973, and 1976. After Parliament Speaker Kenas Aroi accepted a ministerial post from President Hammer DeRoburt, Tsitsi was elected speaker on 22 December 1976. After being unable to keep order, Tsitsi resigned his parliamentary seat on 30 December. In the by-election for his seat in February 1977, Tsitsi was defeated by René Harris.

Tsitsi again attempted to regain his seat in the Aiwo Constituency in the 1980 election, but was defeated. By 1981, Tsitsi was serving as secretary for the Local Government Council. In July 1981, MP René Harris resigned to contest a by-election and test his support. Tsitsi ran in this election, but was defeated by Harris again.

Tsitsi died on 20 May 1997.
