= Joseph Detsimea Audoa =

Nauruan politician

Minister of Justice
- In office 1980–1983
- Preceded by: Kenas Aroi

Minister of Education and Health
- In office 1978–1980
- Succeeded by: Lawrence Stephen

Minister of Justice
- In office 1968–1976
- Succeeded by: Bernard Dowiyogo

Member of Parliament
- In office 1966–1984
- Constituency: Yaren

Member of the Local Government Council
- In office 1955–1984
- Constituency: Yaren

Personal details
- Born: 26 December 1921 Nauru
- Died: 18 April 1984 (aged 62) Melbourne, Australia

Joseph Detsimea Audoa (26 December 1921 – 18 April 1984) was a Nauruan politician. He served as a member of the Parliament of Nauru and its predecessors from 1955 until his death and was a cabinet minister for much of the period from 1968 to 1983.

== Biography ==
Audoa was born in Nauru in December 1921, a member of the Deiboe tribe. He was educated at Nauru Primary School and then trained at the Commonwealth X-Ray and Radium Lab at the University of Melbourne. Returning to Nauru, he worked in the pathology department of Nauru Hospital from 1937 to 1942. Following the Japanese occupation, he was deported to Chuuk in 1942, where he became the medical orderly for Nauruan deportees until 1945. He returned to Melbourne for a course in x-raying in 1950.

In 1955 he was elected to the Local Government Council from the Yaren Constituency. He was re-elected in 1959 and 1963. In 1964 he was appointed as a magistrate. When a new Legislative Council was established in 1966, he was elected to the new body, also remaining a member of the Local Government Council until his death. He was part of the 1967 Constitutional Convention that drew up the independence constitution, and after being re-elected the following year, he was elected to the Council of State and subsequently appointed Minister of Justice. During absences of President Hammer DeRoburt, he often served as Acting President.

He remained Minister of Justice until the 1976 elections when DeRoburt lost the presidency to Bernard Dowiyogo. In May 1978 he returned to the cabinet when DeRoburt became president again, and was appointed Minister for Education and Health. After the 1980 elections he returned to his original portfolio of Minister of Justice, a post he remained in until resigning due to ill health in 1983. He died in Melbourne in April 1984.
