= James Ategan Bop =

Nauruan politician

Minister of Finance
- In office 1978
- Preceded by: Ruben Kun
- Succeeded by: Buraro Detudamo
- In office 1968–1976
- Succeeded by: Kinza Clodumar

Member of Parliament
- In office 1966–1984
- Preceded by: Position established
- Constituency: Meneng

Member of the Local Government Council
- In office 1955–
- Preceded by: Elliott Halstead
- In office 1951–1955
- Succeeded by: Elliott Halstead
- Constituency: Meneng

Personal details
- Died: 12 July 1984 (aged 62); Melbourne, Australia

James Ategan Bop (died 12 July 1984) was a Nauruan politician. He served as a member of Parliament and its predecessors from 1951 to 1955 and then from 1959 until his death, and was Minister of Finance for most of the period between 1968 and 1978.

== Biography ==
Bop was a member of the Iruwa tribe. He was educated at Geelong in Australia. Following World War II he returned to Nauru and was employed by the Nauru Co-operative Society. In elected to the Local Government Council from the Meneng constituency. However, he lost his seat in 1955. In 1957 he joined the Administering Authority run by the Australian government. He was elected to the Local Government Council again in 1959, and re-elected in 1963.

He was elected to the new Legislative Council in 1966 and was part of the 1967 Constitutional Assembly that drew up the independence constitution. After being re-elected in 1968, he was elected to the Council of State and became Minister of Finance later in the year. He remained a minister until the 1976 elections when President Hammer DeRoburt was replaced by Bernard Dowiyogo. When DeRoburt regained the presidency in May 1978, Bop returned as Minister of Finance. However, he was replaced in December the same year. He subsequently became Deputy Speaker in 1979 and was chairman of the Nauru Phosphate Corporation.

He died in Melbourne in Australia in July 1984 at the age of 62.
