= Nimrod Botelanga =

Nauruan politician (1953/54–2013)

Nimrod Botelanga (1953 or 1954 – 14 March 2013) was a Nauruan politician and former member of the cabinet, speaker and a member of parliament.

Botelanga held several portfolios in the cabinets of René Harris, including the portfolio of Minister of Finance from March 2000 to April 2000, from May 2001 to June 2001 and from May 2004 to June 2004. He also held other cabinet portfolios such as health and sports.

In the parliament Botelanga represented the Meneng Constituency. He was elected as the Speaker of the Parliament from 8 August 2003 to 24 February 2004. He lost his parliamentary seat in the 2004 elections to Sprent Dabwido.
