= Vinson Detenamo =

Nauruan politician

Vinson Franco Detenamo (born 1954 in Buada) is a Nauruan politician.

Detenamo remained a member of the Parliament of Nauru for Buada from 1989 to 2003. He served as the Minister of Interior and Finance.

He served as Minister Assisting the President of Nauru in the cabinets of Kenas Aroi, Bernard Dowiyogo, Ruben Kun and Kinza Clodumar in 1989–1995, 1996 and 1996–1999. He was Minister of Finance under Bernard Dowiyogo from June 1994 to November 1995.

In his role as sports minister, Detenamo was involved in the founding of the Nauru Olympic Committee in 1991 and became the first president of the committee, until Marcus Stephen succeeded him by 2009.

Detenamo was most recently elected to the Nauru parliament for the Buada constituency on 3 May 2003, but lost in the 23 October 2004 parliamentary elections.
