= Buraro Detudamo =

Nauruan politician

1st Minister Assisting the President of Nauru
- In office 22 December 1986 – 17 August 1989
- President: Hammer DeRoburt
- Preceded by: Derog Gioura
- Succeeded by: Vinson Detenamo
- In office 1 October 1986 – 12 December 1986
- President: Hammer DeRoburt
- Preceded by: Kinza Clodumar
- Succeeded by: Derog Gioura
- In office 15 May 1978 – 17 September 1986
- President: Hammer DeRoburt
- Preceded by: Ruben Kun
- Succeeded by: Kinza Clodumar
- In office 31 January 1968 – 22 December 1976
- President: Hammer DeRoburt
- Preceded by: Office Established
- Succeeded by: Kinza Clodumar

Personal details
- Born: 1931
- Died: June 5, 1994 (aged 62–63)

Buraro Robidok Bagewa Detudamo (1931 – 5 June 1994) was a Nauruan politician. He was the only son of Timothy Detudamo and brother-in-law to Kennan Adeang. When Buraro was a boy, his family went to Chuuk Islands.

Detudamo served as a member of the Nauru Local Government Council, the Nauru Legislative Council, and the Parliament of Nauru. He also served as Minister Assisting the President of Nauru in all of the cabinets of Hammer DeRoburt between 1968 and 1989. He was also Minister of Finance under Hammer DeRoburt from December 1978 to April 1979.

In 1992, Buraro Detudamo was the opposition candidate for the presidency, losing to Bernard Dowiyogo in a 7–10 vote. Detudamo held the position of Minister of Public Works.
