= Kenas Aroi =

President of Nauru in 1989

His Excellency Kenas Aroi

President of Nauru
- In office 17 August 1989 – 12 December 1989
- Deputy: Vinson Detenamo
- Preceded by: Hammer DeRoburt
- Succeeded by: Bernard Dowiyogo

Member of the Nauruan Parliament for Boe
- In office January 31, 1968 – January 22, 1991
- Preceded by: Constituency Established
- Succeeded by: Detonga Deiye

Speaker of the Parliament of Nauru
- In office January 1971 – January 1977
- Preceded by: Itubwa Amram
- Succeeded by: Samuel Tsitsi

Personal details
- Born: 17 April 1942
- Died: 22 January 1991 (aged 48)
- Spouse: Millicent Aroi
- Children: Michael Aroi, a.o.

Kenas Aroi (17 April 1942 – 22 January 1991) was a Nauruan politician and, from 17 August to 12 December 1989, President of the Republic of Nauru.

== Background ==
Aroi was a member of the Parliament of Nauru, Speaker of the Parliament of Nauru from January 1971 to January 1977. He was elevated to cabinet in January 1977. He was Minister of Finance under Bernard Dowiyogo in January 1978.

Aroi was also Minister of Finance under Hammer DeRoburt from April 1979 to September 1986 and again from October 1986 to December 1986. Before he became president, Aroi was involved in the Nauru Phosphate Corporation.

== President of Nauru ==
With support from Kennan Adeang, as Hammer DeRoburt was caught in a military situation, Aroi became president on 17 August 1989. Adeang then became finance minister. During his period of Presidential office Aroi experienced health problems and after a stroke in November 1989 he did not run in the elections in December of that year. He was succeeded on 12 December 1989 by Bernard Dowiyogo.

== Personal ==
Kenas Aroi was a member of the Eamwitmwit tribe. Aroi died on 22 January 1991. His widow, Millicent Aroi, has served as Nauru's High Commissioner to Fiji.

== See also ==
- Politics in Nauru
