= Kinza Clodumar =

President of Nauru from 1997 to 1998

His Excellency Kinza Clodumar
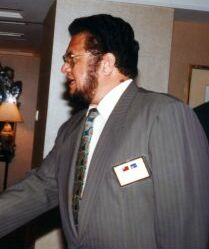
- Clodumar in 1998

President of Nauru
- In office 13 February 1997 – 18 June 1998
- Deputy: Vinson Detenamo
- Preceded by: Ruben Kun
- Succeeded by: Bernard Dowiyogo

Member of the Nauruan Parliament for Boe
- In office 20 November 1995 – 5 May 2003
- Preceded by: Michael Aroi
- Succeeded by: Mathew Batsiua

Member of the Nauruan Parliament for Aiwo
- In office 5 December 1983 – 9 December 1989
- Preceded by: David Agir
- Succeeded by: Theodore Moses
- In office 25 January 1971 – 29 January 1979
- Preceded by: Itubwa Amram
- Succeeded by: David Agir

Speaker of the Parliament of Nauru
- In office December 1986 – December 1986
- Preceded by: René Harris
- Succeeded by: Pres Nimes Ekwona

Personal details
- Born: 8 February 1945 Boe, Japanese-occupied Nauru
- Died: 29 November 2021 (aged 76)
- Party: Centre Party
- Spouse: Mirosława Clodumar

Kinza Godfrey Clodumar (8 February 1945 – 29 November 2021) was a Nauruan politician who served as President of Nauru from 1997 to 1998.

== Background ==
Clodumar was born in Boe during the Japanese occupation of Nauru on 8 February 1945. He served as a member of the Parliament of Nauru for several terms.

Clodumar was the only Nauruan politician to have been elected to parliament in two different constituencies. He was first elected to represent the Aiwo Constituency in the 1971 elections, defeating Itubwa Amram. After serving two terms and being re-elected three more times, Clodumar resigned his seat in early 1979, but returned to Parliament in the 1983 elections. In 1992, he did not stand for the seat and moved to the neighbouring Boe Constituency, where he was re-elected in 1995 to serve a third term in parliament.

Clodumar served as Minister Assisting the President of Nauru in the cabinets of Bernard Dowiyogo and Kennan Adeang in 1976-1978 and from September 1986 to October 1986. He was the Speaker of the Parliament of Nauru from a short term in December 1986.

He was Minister of Finance several times: January 1977 to January 1978, September 1986 to October 1986, December 1986 to August 1989, December 1989 to September 1993 and in November 1996.

== Presidency ==
Clodumar was President of Nauru from 12 February 1997 until 18 June 1998, when he was deposed in a no confidence vote. He held the office of Minister of Finance of Nauru during his term.

== Later life ==
He later served again as Minister of Finance several times: April 1999 to June 1999, May 2000 to August 2000, March 2004 to May 2004 and June 2004 to August 2004. In 2003, Clodumar tried to regain the presidency of Nauru twice but narrowly lost the parliamentary vote both times. He lost his seat in Parliament in the October 2004 election.

Clodumar was also noted for having founded and led the Centre Party.

He died on 29 November 2021, at the age of 76, and received a state funeral the following day.

== See also ==
- Itubwa Amram#Political role
- David Agir#Political role
