= Kennan Adeang =

President of Nauru in 1986 and 1996

His Excellency Kennan Adeang

President of Nauru
- In office 17 September 1986 – 1 October 1986
- Deputy: Kinza Clodumar
- Preceded by: Hammer DeRoburt
- Succeeded by: Hammer DeRoburt
- In office 12 December 1986 – 22 December 1986
- Deputy: Derog Gioura
- Preceded by: Hammer DeRoburt
- Succeeded by: Hammer DeRoburt
- In office 26 November 1996 – 19 December 1996
- Deputy: Ruby Dediya
- Preceded by: Bernard Dowiyogo
- Succeeded by: Ruben Kun

Member of the Nauruan Parliament for Ubenide
- In office 25 January 1971 – 18 June 1971
- Preceded by: Derog Gioura
- Succeeded by: Derog Gioura
- In office 17 December 1973 – 18 December 1976
- Preceded by: Derog Gioura
- Succeeded by: Derog Gioura
- In office 16 May 1977 – 14 September 1978
- Preceded by: Derog Gioura
- Succeeded by: Derog Gioura
- In office 8 December 1980 – 25 July 1988
- Preceded by: Lagumot Harris
- Succeeded by: Constituency abolished
- In office 3 September 1988 – 8 April 2000
- Preceded by: Constituency re-established
- Succeeded by: Joseph Hiram

Speaker of the Parliament of Nauru
- In office February 1997 – December 1998
- Preceded by: Maein Deireragea
- Succeeded by: Ludwig Keke

Personal details
- Born: Kennan Ranibok Adeang; 23 December 1942 Japanese-occupied Nauru
- Died: 26 December 2011 (aged 69) Nauru
- Party: Democratic Party of Nauru
- Children: David Adeang

Kennan Ranibok Adeang (23 December 1942 – 26 December 2011) was a Nauruan politician who served as President of Nauru for three separate and brief periods during the late 20th century.

Born in Nauru, and educated in Australia, including at the Australian School of Pacific Administration, Adeang was first elected to the Parliament of Nauru in 1971, representing the seat of Ubenide, and became a noted opponent of Hammer DeRoburt, the country's first president. He first became president in 1986, serving two short terms at the end of that year, one lasting 15 days and the other only 11 days. In the following year, 1987, Adeang was involved in the establishment of the Democratic Party of Nauru, one of the first political parties in Nauru. He again served as president in late 1996, but lost power in a motion of no confidence after only 24 days in office. Adeang was active in parliament until 2000, serving at various times in the Cabinet, and also as Speaker from February 1997 to December 1998. In 2007, he was appointed High Commissioner to the Republic of Fiji, serving in the position until his death in 2011.

== Biography ==
Adeang was born in Nauru and educated in Nauru and Australia, attending the Australian School of Pacific Administration (ASOPA) from 1962 to 1963. He was first elected to parliament for the seat of Ubenide in 1971, replacing Derog Gioura, but was forced to resign a few months later; Gioura re-took his seat in the parliament. Adeang was re-elected in 1973 to serve a second term but lost his seat again to Gioura in the 1976 elections. In the 1977 snap elections, Adeang was re-elected but had to resign once again to leave Gioura the seat. In 1980, both Adeang and Gioura were elected to parliament and they both served long-time terms from then on. Adeang had to resign again in 1987 for two months but was re-elected in the following by-election. Adeang was regarded as a strong opponent of Hammer DeRoburt, who had served as Nauru's first president.

Adeang served twice as President of Nauru in 1986. In September of that year, he was elected by a margin of one vote over the incumbent DeRoburt but was ousted following a vote of no confidence after only 14 days. Following a general election in December, he was again elected as president only to lose the office following another vote of no confidence. He was replaced by DeRoburt. In 1987, Adeang was involved in the establishment of the Democratic Party of Nauru, one of the first official groupings of Nauruan parliamentarians since the 1970s. He was Minister of Finance under Kenas Aroi from August 1989 to December 1989.

Adeang again held the Presidency of Nauru in November and December 1996. He gained office following a vote of no confidence in November 1996 but lost it in the same way in December of the same year. Following the February 1997 election, Adeang served in the Cabinet of President Kinza Clodumar. Early in 1998, in his capacity as Speaker, Adeang required five members of the house to resign, including the former President Lagumot Harris, following remarks made about him in an opposition newsletter. Following elections later that year, three of those members were re-elected.

Adeange retired from parliament in April 2000. He was appointed to the position of High Commissioner to Fiji during 2007, during which time he was accused of, and denied, verbally abusing two ministers. The allegations were made by a resigning Nauru Health Minister, Kieren Keke. He died in December 2011.

== See also ==
- Politics in Nauru

Preceded by Hammer DeRoburt; Hammer DeRoburt; Bernard Dowiyogo	President of Nauru; 17 September 1986 – 1 October 1986; 12 December 1986 – 22 December 1986; 26 November 1996 – 19 December 1996	Succeeded by Hammer DeRoburt; Hammer DeRoburt; Ruben Kun
