= Derog Gioura =

President of Nauru in 2003 (1932–2008)

His Excellency Derog Gioura

President of Nauru
- In office 10 March – 29 May 2003; Acting President until 20 March
- Deputy: Ludwig Scotty
- Preceded by: Bernard Dowiyogo
- Succeeded by: Ludwig Scotty

Member of the Nauruan Parliament for Ubenide
- In office 31 January 1968 – 25 January 1971
- Preceded by: New title
- Succeeded by: Kennan Adeang
- In office 18 August 1971 – 17 December 1973
- Preceded by: Kennan Adeang
- Succeeded by: Kennan Adeang
- In office 18 December 1976 – 26 May 1977
- Preceded by: Kennan Adeang
- Succeeded by: Kennan Adeang
- In office 21 October 1978 – 6 November 2001
- Preceded by: Kennan Adeang
- Succeeded by: Himself
- In office 18 December 2001 – 23 October 2004
- Preceded by: Himself
- Succeeded by: Valdon Dowiyogo

Speaker of the Parliament of Nauru
- In office 1987 – November 1992
- Preceded by: Pres Nimes Ekwona
- Succeeded by: Paul Jeremiah

Personal details
- Born: 1 September 1932 Nauru
- Died: 25 September 2008 (aged 76)

Derog Gioura (1 September 1932 – 25 September 2008) was a Nauruan political figure. He was President of the Republic of Nauru (acting) in 2003.

== Political role ==
Gioura has been fighting many years with Kennan Adeang over a parliamentary seat in the Ubenide constituency, resulting in numerous vacations and by-elections between them two; the fight ended when they were both continually elected since 1980.

Gioura was the Speaker of the Parliament of Nauru from 1987 until November 1992.

He served as Minister Assisting the President of Nauru in cabinets of Kennan Adeang, Bernard Dowiyogo and René Harris in 1986, 2000–2001, 2003, 2003, 2003–2004. He was Minister of Finance in the cabinet of Bernard Dowiyogo from December 1998 to April 1999.

During the tumultuous year of 2003, the office of President of Nauru changed hands on six occasions. The perennial challenge for presidential office-holders in Nauru is to stave off a vote of no confidence, to which frequent recourse is made; in 2003, these factors were particularly acute, given the ill health of President Bernard Dowiyogo.

=== President of Nauru ===
In 2003, on the death in office of President Bernard Dowiyogo, Gioura emerged as President of Nauru, initially on an interim basis. One of the results of Gioura's short period of office was the facilitating of the path of his successor, Ludwig Scotty, who, after a hiatus of several months, oversaw a more stable period of politics in Nauru.

==== Cabinet ====
The Derog Gioura cabinet was the government of Nauru led by Derog Gioura from March to May 2003. Gioura became president following the death of Bernard Dowiyogo and governed during a period of intense political instability marked by frequent changes of government and parliamentary no-confidence motions. His administration was short-lived and was succeeded by the government of Ludwig Scotty in May 2003.

- Derog Gioura — President of Nauru
- Ludwig Scotty — Minister Assisting the President
- David Adeang — senior government official

== Health ==
During his brief Presidency, Gioura underwent a period of enforced absence from the country, since there were concerns for his health; he received a series of medical treatment in Australia.

By the year 2007, Nauruan political figures of Gioura's generation had been somewhat eclipsed by a younger set of leaders: in December 2007 the incoming President of Nauru Marcus Stephen was nearly four decades younger than Derog Gioura. While there were a few changes of President since 2003, Gioura did not resume the office since relinquishing it in that year.

=== Death ===
Derog Gioura died in 2008.

== See also ==
- Politics of Nauru
