= Lagumot Harris =

President of Nauru (1978; 1995–1996)

His Excellency Lagumot Harris

President of Nauru
- In office 19 April 1978 – 15 May 1978
- Deputy: Ruben Kun
- Preceded by: Bernard Dowiyogo
- Succeeded by: Hammer DeRoburt
- In office 22 November 1995 – 11 November 1996
- Deputy: Ruben Kun
- Preceded by: Bernard Dowiyogo
- Succeeded by: Bernard Dowiyogo

Member of the Nauruan Parliament for Ubenide
- In office 31 January 1968 – 18 December 1976
- Preceded by: Position Established
- Succeeded by: Victor Eoaeo
- In office 12 November 1977 – 8 December 1980
- Preceded by: Victor Eoaeo
- Succeeded by: Kennan Adeang
- In office 9 July 1994 – 21 February 1998
- Preceded by: Buraro Detudamo
- Succeeded by: Aloysius Amwano

Personal details
- Born: Lagumot Gagiemem Nimidere Harris; 23 December 1938 Nauru
- Died: 8 September 1999 (aged 60) Melbourne, Australia
- Spouse: Amanda Harris

Lagumot Gagiemem Nimidere Harris (23 December 1938 – 8 September 1999) was a political figure from the Pacific nation of the Republic of Nauru, and served as its President. He was a cousin of René Harris, who also became Nauru president subsequently.

== President of Nauru ==
=== First term ===
Lagumot Harris first served briefly as President of Nauru from 19 April to 15 May 1978. Thus, he was Nauru's third head of state since its independence in 1968. In terms of Nauru's emerging post-Independence political culture, the shortness of Harris's first term of Presidential office anticipated the very frequent changes of President to which Nauruans were to become accustomed, in contrast with the many years of Hammer DeRoburt's continuous first term of office.

=== Second term ===
Subsequently, a period of nearly twenty years elapsed before Harris assumed the Presidency of Nauru for a second term.

He was elected President of Nauru again, and served between 22 November 1995 and 11 November 1996.

Harris was Minister of Finance in the cabinet of Ruben Kun from December 1996 to February 1997.

== Issues and alignment ==
Much of Lagumot Harris's active involvement in political leadership revolved around troubled issues surrounding the veteran Nauruan politician, seven-time President Bernard Dowiyogo. It may be recalled that, especially during Harris' periods of public office and political activity, Nauru's Parliamentary system did not have well-developed party organisations.

== Death ==
Harris died in Melbourne, Australia, on 8 September 1999 at the age of 60.

== See also ==
- Politics of Nauru

Preceded by Bernard Dowiyogo	President of Nauru; 19 April 1978 – 15 May 1978	Succeeded by Hammer DeRoburt
Preceded by Bernard Dowiyogo	President of Nauru; 22 November 1995 – 11 November 1996	Succeeded by Bernard Dowiyogo
