= Ruben Kun =

President of Nauru from 1996 to 1997

The Honourable Ruben Kun MP

Minister Assisting the President
- In office 19 April 1978 – 15 May 1978
- President: Lagumot Harris
- In office 22 November 1995 – 11 November 1996
- President: Lagumot Harris

President of Nauru
- In office 19 December 1996 – 13 February 1997
- Deputy: Vinson Detenamo
- Preceded by: Kennan Adeang
- Succeeded by: Kinza Clodumar

Member of the Nauruan Parliament for Buada
- In office 25 January 1971 – 16 November 1992
- Preceded by: Totouwa Depaune
- Succeeded by: Tamaiti Star
- In office 20 November 1995 – 8 April 2000
- Preceded by: Tamaiti Star
- Succeeded by: Terangi Adam

Speaker of the Parliament of Nauru
- In office August 1981 – 12 December 1986
- Preceded by: David Peter Gadaraoa
- Succeeded by: René Harris

Personal details
- Born: Ruben James Kun; 30 March 1942 Nauru
- Died: 21 September 2014 (aged 72)
- Profession: Lawyer

Ruben James Kun (30 March 1942 – 21 September 2014) was a political figure from the Pacific nation of Nauru and was president of the Republic of Nauru.

== Early career ==
Kun was a lawyer before becoming a political figure.

He was the minister assisting the president of Nauru in the cabinets of Lagumot Harris in 1978 and 1995–1996. He was the speaker of the Parliament of Nauru from August 1981 to December 1986.

He was Minister of Finance under Bernard Dowiyogo and Lagumot Harris from January 1978 to May 1978, and again in the cabinet of Lagumot Harris from November 1995 to November 1996.

== President of Nauru ==
Kun succeeded Kennan Adeang as president of Nauru from 19 December 1996 to 13 February 1997, and was succeeded by Kinza Clodumar.

== Post-presidency ==
Kun was again Minister of Finance under Bernard Dowiyogo from August 1998 to December 1998. Under the Pacific Solution asylum policy, Australia has an arrangement with Nauru that allows asylum seekers arriving in Australia to be detained on the island. Kun represented detainees in a case before the nation's Supreme Court.

== See also ==
- Politics of Nauru
