= Boe constituency =

Boe
- Constituency
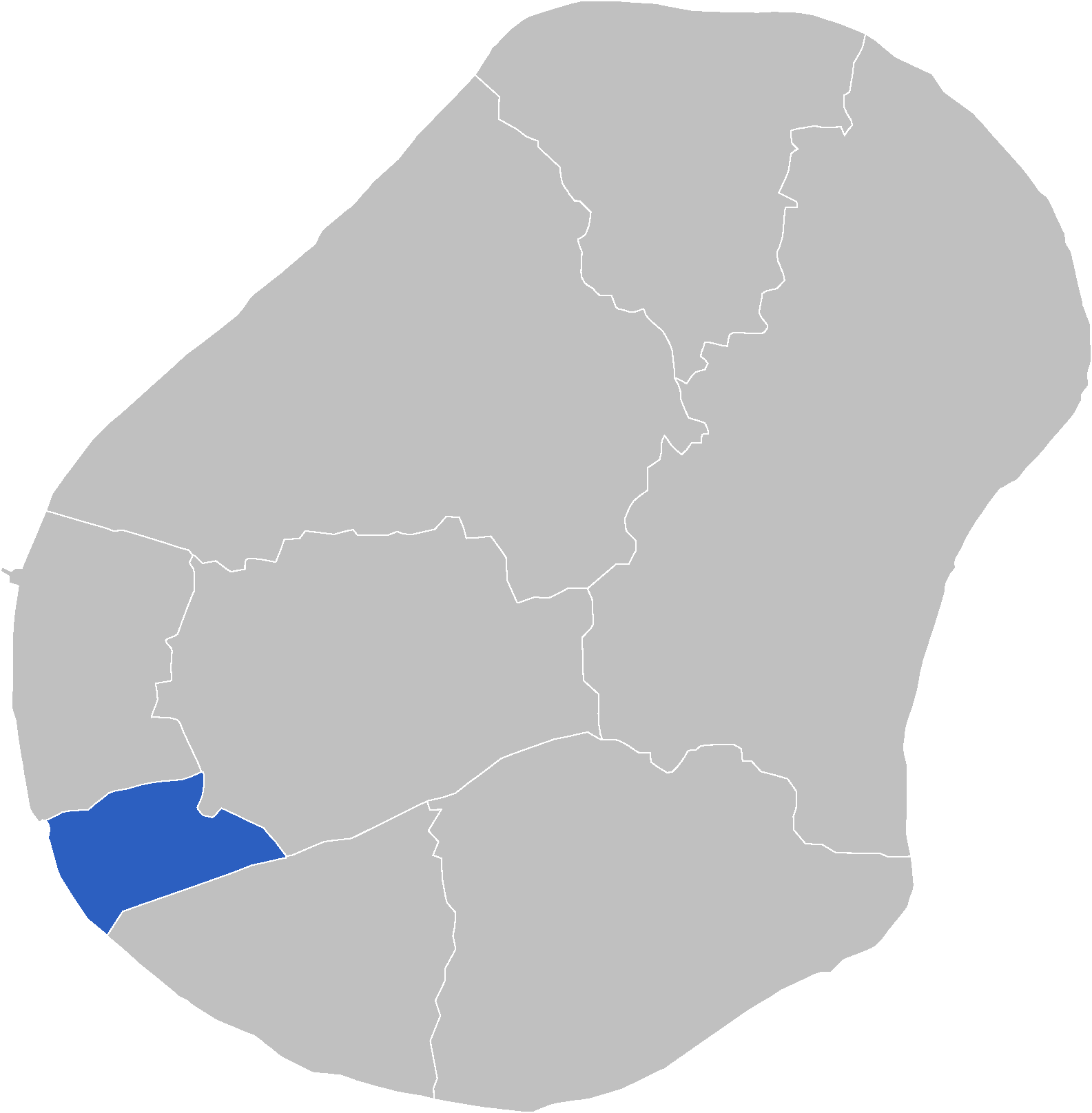
- Boe Constituency within Nauru
- Coordinates: 0°32′30″S 166°54′51″E
- Country: Nauru
- Districts: 1 (Boe)

Area
  - Total: 0.5 km^{2} (0.19 sq mi)

Population (2011)
  - Total: 851
- Time zone: (UTC+12)
- Area code: +674
- Members of Parliament: 2

Boe is one of the constituencies of Nauru. It returns two members from Boe to the Parliament of Nauru in Yaren.

== Members of Parliament ==
Seat 1
Member	Term	Party
Kenas Aroi	1968–1991	Non-partisan
Detonga Deiye	1991–1995	Non-partisan
Kinza Clodumar	1995–2003	Centre Party
Mathew Batsiua	2003–2016	Non-partisan
Asterio Appi	2016–present	
Seat 2
Member	Term	Party
Hammer DeRoburt	1968–1992	Non-partisan
Michael Aroi	1992–?	Non-partisan
Ross Cain	?–2003	Non-partisan
Baron Waqa	2003–2019	Non-partisan
Martin Hunt	2019–2025	
Wanganeen Emiu	2025–present	

== Election results ==
Candidate	Preference votes					Total	Notes
Candidate	1	2	3	4	5	Total	Notes
Asterio Appi	419	182	105	64	140	589.000	Re-elected
Wanganeen Emiu	176	178	204	181	171	412.450	Elected
Martin Hunt	176	145	199	199	191	402.783	Unseated
Roy Denton Harris	129	84	161	287	249	346.217	
Samvic Namaduk	10	321	241	179	159	327.383	
Valid votes	910						
Invalid votes	9						
Total votes	919						
Source: Electoral Commission of Nauru
