= Anetan constituency =

Anetan
- Constituency
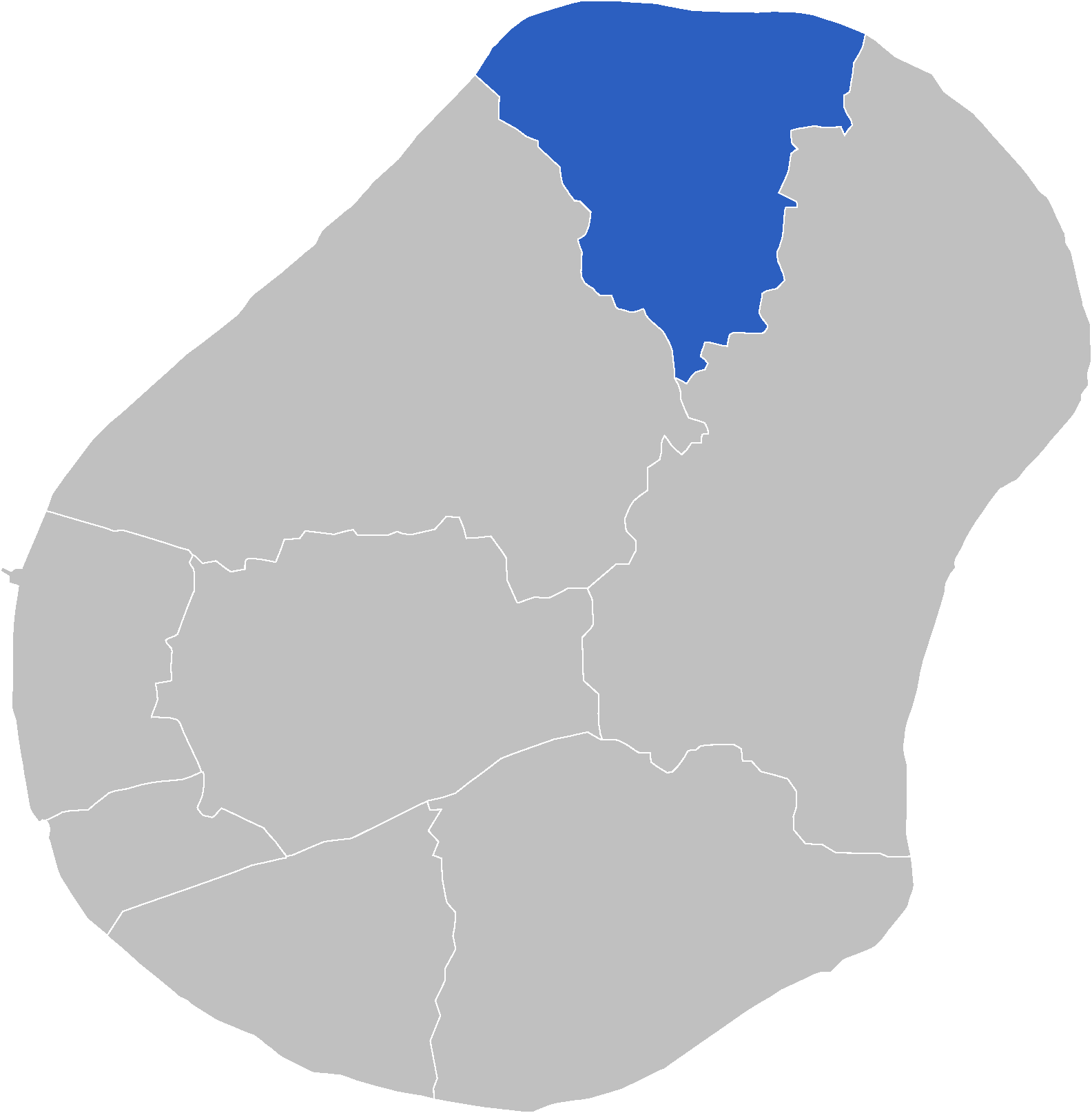
- Anetan Constituency within Nauru
- Coordinates: 0°30′19″S 166°56′33″E
- Country: Nauru
- Districts: 2 (Anetan, Ewa)

Area
  - Total: 2.2 km^{2} (0.85 sq mi)

Population (2011)
  - Total: 1,180
- Time zone: (UTC+12)
- Area code: +674
- Members of Parliament: 2

Anetan is one of the constituencies of Nauru and is made up of two districts: Anetan and Ewa. It covers an area of 2.2 km^{2}, and has a population of 1,180. It returns two members to the Parliament of Nauru in Yaren. It is the northernmost constituency in Nauru.

== Members of Parliament ==
Seat 1
Member	Term	Party
Paul Diema	1968–1971	Non-partisan
Lawrence Stephen	1971–1977	Non-partisan
Bucky Ika	1977–?	Non-partisan
Roy Degoregore	?–1980	Non-partisan
Lawrence Stephen	1980–1986	Non-partisan
Ruby Dediya	1986–1992	Non-partisan
Lawrence Stephen	1992–1995	Non-partisan
Ruby Dediya	1995–1997	Non-partisan
Vassal Gadoengin	1997–2003	Non-partisan
Marcus Stephen	2003–2016	Non-partisan
Sean Oppenheimer	2016–2019	Non-partisan
Timothy Ika	2019–present	
Seat 2
Member	Term	Party
Remy Namaduk	?–2004	Non-partisan
Vassal Gadoengin	2004	Non-partisan
Cyril Buraman	2004–2008	Non-partisan
Landon Deireragea	2008–2013	Non-partisan
Cyril Buraman	2013–2019	Non-partisan
Marcus Stephen	2019–present	Non-partisan

== Election results ==
Candidate	Preference votes					Total	Notes
Candidate	1	2	3	4	5	Total	Notes
Timothy Ika	394	255	71	63	38	568.517	Re-elected
Marcus Stephen	262	293	64	64	138	473.433	Re-elected
Fabian Ika	113	146	123	115	324	320.550	
Raynor Tom	48	75	165	390	143	266.600	
Julie Olsson	4	52	398	189	178	245.517	
Valid votes	821						
Invalid votes	10						
Total votes	831						
Source: Electoral Commission of Nauru
