= Buada constituency =

Buada
- Constituency
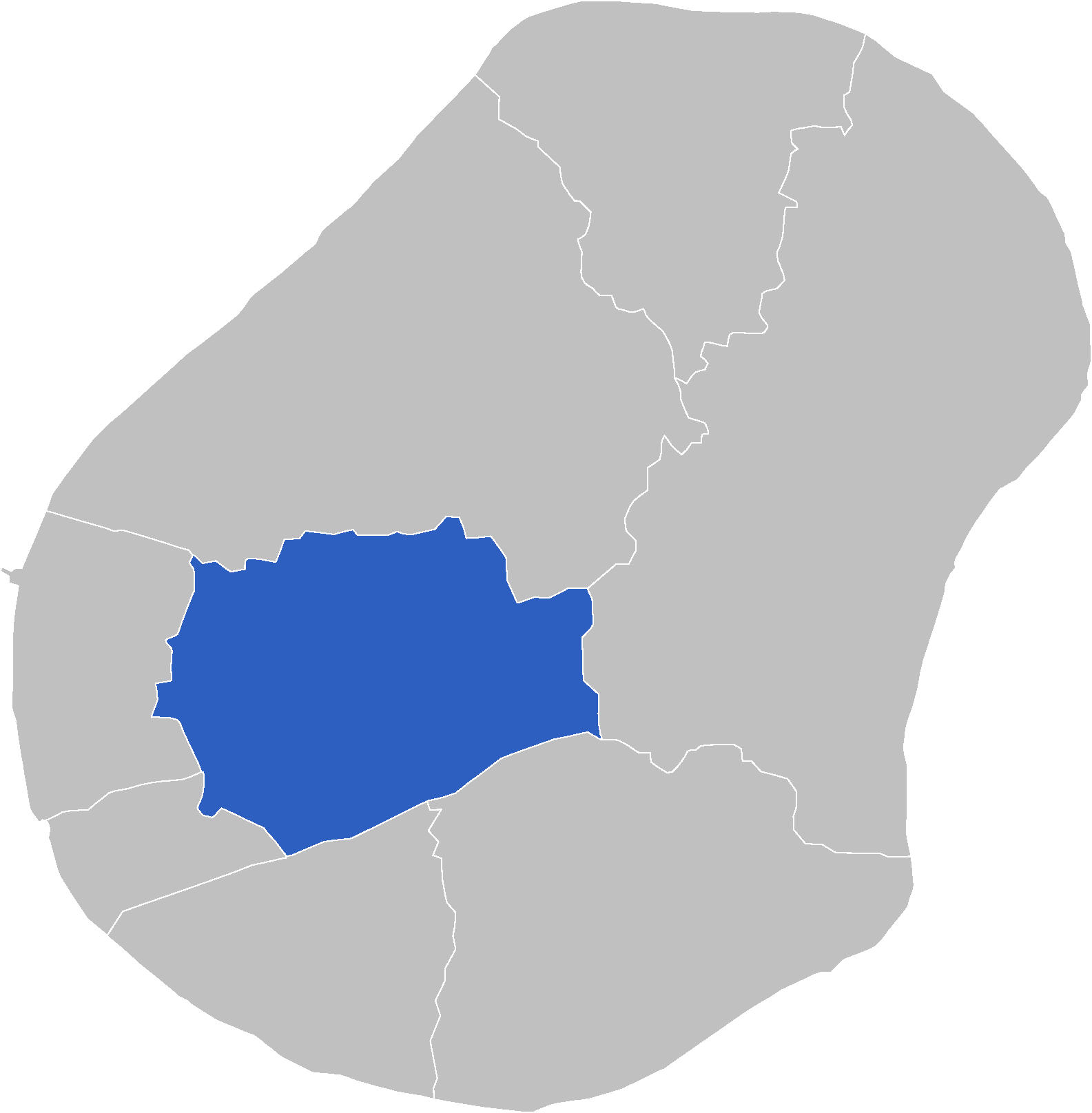
- Buada Constituency within Nauru
- Coordinates: 0°31′59″S 166°55′01″E
- Country: Nauru
- Districts: 1 (Buada)

Area
  - Total: 2.6 km^{2} (1.0 sq mi)

Population (2011)
  - Total: 739
- Time zone: (UTC+12)
- Area code: +674
- Members of Parliament: 2

Buada is one of the constituencies of Nauru. It returns two members from Buada to the Parliament of Nauru in Yaren. It is the only constituency in the country to be landlocked.

== Members of Parliament ==
Seat 1
Member	Term	Party
Totouwa Depaune	1968–1971	Non-partisan
Ruben Kun	1971–1992	Non-partisan
Tamaiti Star	1992–1995	Non-partisan
Ruben Kun	1995–2000	Non-partisan
Terangi Adam	2000–2007	Non-partisan
Shadlog Bernicke	2007–present	Non-partisan
Seat 2
Member	Term	Party
Vinson Detenamo	2000–2004	Non-partisan
Roland Kun	2004–2016	Nauru First
Bingham Agir	2016–present	

== Election results ==
Candidate	Preference votes					Total	Notes
Candidate	1	2	3	4	5	Total	Notes
Shadlog Bernicke	219	130	36	47	56	318.950	Re-elected
Bingham Agir	112	72	38	38	228	215.767	Re-elected
Jansen Palik Agir	44	134	154	108	48	198.933	
Hero Dwane Kephas	47	96	174	84	87	191.400	
Dixon Rengiden Adam	66	56	86	211	69	189.217	
Valid votes	488						
Invalid votes	3						
Total votes	491						
Source: Electoral Commission of Nauru
