= Yaren constituency =

Yaren
- Constituency
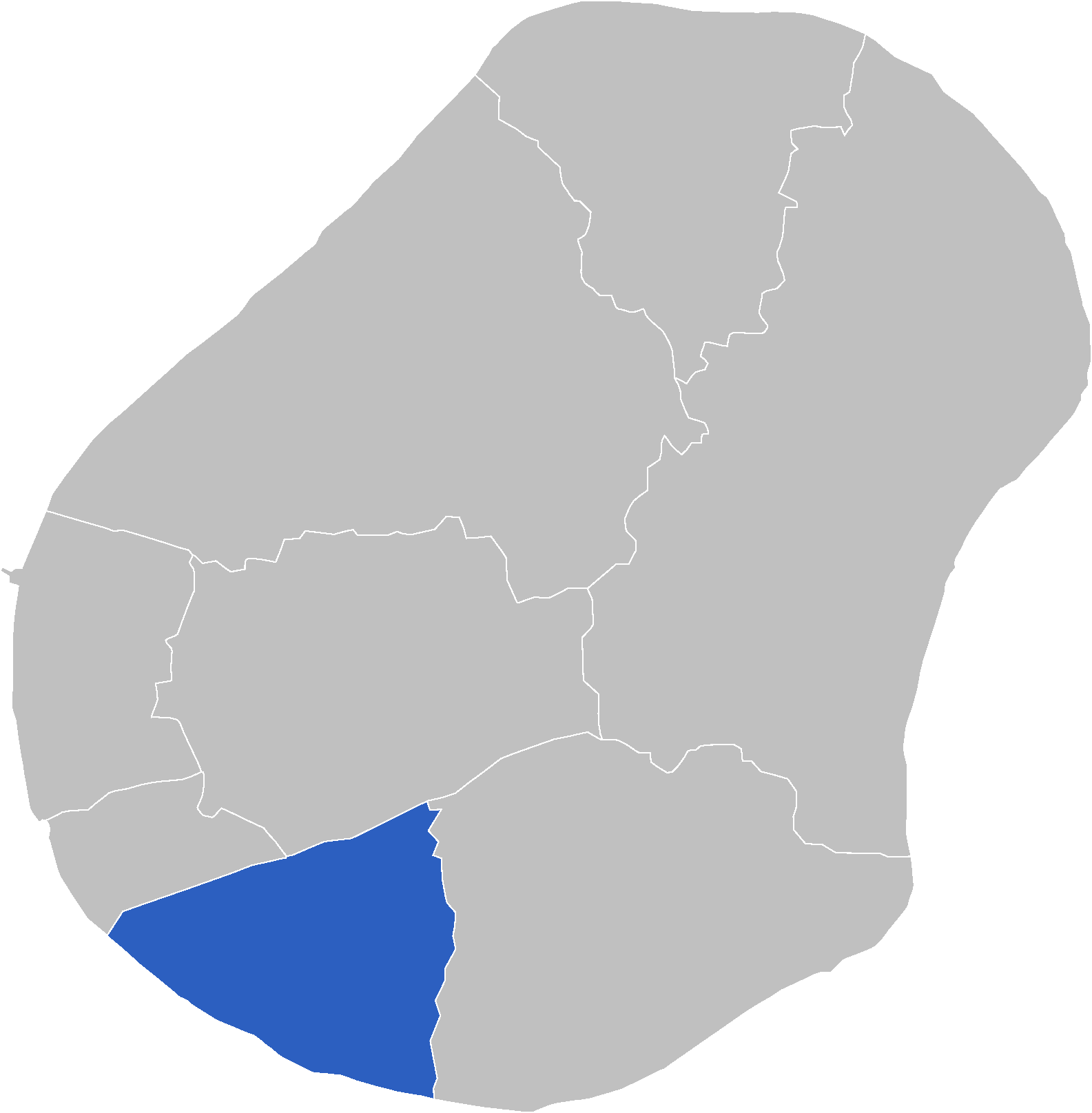
- Yaren Constituency within Nauru
- Coordinates: 0°32′51.72″S 166°55′15.12″E
- Country: Nauru
- Districts: 1 (Yaren)

Area
  - Total: 1.5 km^{2} (0.58 sq mi)

Population (2011)
  - Total: 747
- Time zone: (UTC+12)
- Area code: +674
- Members of Parliament: 2

Yaren is one of the constituencies of Nauru. It returns two members from Yaren to the Parliament of Nauru in Yaren, and also is the de facto capital of Nauru.

== Members of Parliament ==
Seat 1
Member	Term	Party
Anthony Audoa	?-2003	Non-partisan
Kieren Keke	2003–2019	Non-partisan
Isabella Degagogo	2019-present	Non-partisan
Seat 2
Member	Term	Party
Pres Ekwona	?-2004	Non-partisan
Dominic Tabuna	2004-2013	Non-partisan
Charmaine Scotty	2013–present	Non-partisan

== Election results ==
Candidate	Preference votes							Total	Notes
Candidate	1	2	3	4	5	6	7	Total	Notes
Charmaine Scotty	401	293	78	49	62	101	87	627.412	Re-elected
Isabella Dageago	320	110	89	72	80	130	270	498.905	Re-elected
Hunter Itaia	240	180	120	94	99	159	179	465.371	
Dagan Ashly Scot Kaierua	39	137	236	264	215	125	55	323.857	
Dekoga Dowedia	22	125	224	239	182	145	134	298.626	
Dominic Rumple Cain	17	134	163	233	223	171	130	288.255	
Caruso Amwano	32	92	161	120	210	240	216	274.524	
Valid votes	1,071								
Invalid votes	14								
Total votes	1,085								
Source: Electoral Commission of Nauru
