= Index of Nauru-related articles =

Topics related to Nauru (arranged alphabetically) include:

== A ==
- Acrocephalus rehsei
- Aiwo constituency
- Aiwo district
- Aloysius Amwano
- Anabar district
- Anetan district
- Angam Day
- Anibare district
- Arenibek
- Areop-Enap
- Arubo
- Audi Dabwido
- Australian rules football in Nauru
- Aweida

== B ==
- Baitsi district
- Baron Waqa
- Bernard Dowiyogo
- Boe constituency

== C ==
- Centre Party (Nauru)
- Constitution of Nauru
- COVID-19 pandemic in Nauru
- Crime in Nauru
- Culture of Nauru

== D ==
- David Adeang
- Deep-sea mining regulations in Nauru
- Democratic Party of Nauru
- Demographics of Nauru
- Denigomodu district
- Derog Gioura
- Districts of Nauru

== E ==
- Economy of Nauru
- Education in Nauru

== F ==
- Fabian Ribauw
- Flag of Nauru
- Foreign relations of Nauru
- Freddie Pitcher

== G ==
- Geology of Nauru
- Geography of Nauru
- German attacks on Nauru
- Godfrey Thoma
- Greta Harris

== H ==
- Hammer DeRoburt
- History of Nauru
- History of wireless telegraphy and broadcasting in Nauru (summary of History of wireless telegraphy and broadcasting in Australia#Nauru
- History of wireless telegraphy and broadcasting in Australia#Nauru (includes full transcripts of many Trove articles)
- Human rights in Nauru

== I ==
- Ijuh
- Ijuw district
- India-Nauru relations

== J ==
- Japanese occupation of Nauru
- John Fearn (whaler)

== K ==
- Kenas Aroi
- Kennan Adeang
- Kieren Keke
- Kinza Clodumar

== L ==
- Lagumot Harris
- LGBT rights in Nauru
- Linkbelt Oval
- List of birds of Nauru
- Ludwig Keke
- Ludwig Scotty

== M ==
- Marcus Stephen
- Margaret Hendrie
- Marlene Moses
- Mathew Batsiua
- Meneng Constituency
- Meneng District
- Moqua Caves
- Moqua Well
- Music of Nauru

== N ==
- National Stadium (Nauru)
- Nauru 19
- Nauru at the 1996 Summer Olympics
- Nauru at the 2000 Summer Olympics
- Nauru at the 2002 Commonwealth Games
- Nauru at the 2004 Summer Olympics
- Nauru at the 2006 Commonwealth Games
- Nauru at the 2008 Summer Olympics
- Nauru at the 2010 Commonwealth Games
- Nauru at the 2010 Summer Youth Olympics
- Nauru at the Commonwealth Games
- Nauru at the Olympics
- Nauru Broadcasting Service
- Nauru Bwiema
- Nauru Congregational Church
- Nauru First
- Nauru House
- Nauru International Airport
- Nauru Island Agreement
- Nauru Olympic Committee
- Nauru Pacific Line
- Nauru Phosphate Corporation
- Nauru Phosphate Royalties Trust
- Nauru reed warbler
- Nauru Regional Processing Centre
- Nauru–Russia relations
- Nauru Television
- Nauru
- Nauruan Civil War
- 2010 Nauruan constitutional referendum
- Nauruan indigenous religion
- Nauruan language
- Nauruan nationality law
- 2007 Nauruan parliamentary election
- 2008 Nauruan parliamentary election
- Nauruan Pidgin English
- 2007 Nauruan presidential election
- 2010 Nauruan presidential election
- 2011 Nauruan presidential election
- 2013 Nauruan presidential election
- 2016 Nauruan presidential election
- Nauruan Tribal War
- Nauruans
- Nibok District

== O ==
- Obesity in Nauru
- Operation Weasel
- Our Airline
- Outline of Nauru

== P ==
- Parliament of Nauru
- Philip Delaporte
- Phosphate mining in Nauru
- Political families of Nauru
- Politics of Nauru
- President of Nauru

== R ==
- Radio Nauru
- Rail transport in Nauru
- Reanna Solomon
- Religion in Nauru
- René Harris
- Republic of Nauru Hospital
- Riddell Akua
- Roland Kun
- Ruben Kun
- Russell Kun
- Rykers Solomon

== S ==
- Scouting and Guiding in Nauru
- Sprent Dabwido
- State House (Nauru)
- Supreme Court of Nauru

== T ==
- Transport in Nauru

== U ==
- Uaboe District
- Ubenide Constituency

== V ==
- Visa policy of Nauru

== Y ==
- Yaren District
- Yukio Peter

== See also ==
- Lists of country-related topics – similar lists for other countries
