= Foreign relations of Nauru =

- Independence: 31 January 1968
- Joined UN: 14 September 1999

Nauru became a sovereign, independent republic on 31 January 1968, following the passage of the Nauru Independence Act 1967 by the Parliament of Australia and the end of its status as a United Nations Trust Territory. Nauru has established diplomatic relations with a number of nations, including most of its Pacific neighbors with which it maintains economic, cultural and administrative ties.

== Membership in international organisations ==
Nauru was admitted to the United Nations on 14 September 1999. Nauru's application to the United Nations was questioned by the People's Republic of China due to Nauru's close diplomatic and trade links to Taiwan. Nevertheless, Nauru was granted UN full membership.

Nauru became a full member of the Commonwealth of Nations in May 1999. Since independence, Nauru had been a special member of the Commonwealth prior to 1999, but having fallen behind in payments, reverted to Special Member status on 1 July 2005, with no authoritative power. It then returned to be a full member again in June 2011.

Additionally outside the region, Nauru is a member or participant of the ACP (Lomé Convention), the Alliance of Small Island States, the Asian Development Bank, the Economic and Social Commission for Asia and the Pacific (ESCAP), the Food and Agriculture Organization (FAO), the G-77, the International Civil Aviation Organization, the International Maritime Organization, the ITU, and the International Olympic Committee.

Nauru is notable for its lack of membership in several major international organisations. Nauru is one of only seven UN members that is not a member of the International Bank for Reconstruction and Development and one of 12 not part of the International Finance Corporation. Nauru also is not a member of the International Development Association and has no society associated with the International Red Cross and Red Crescent Movement. Finally, as with many other nations in Oceania, Nauru is not a member of the International Hydrographic Organization.

== Membership in regional organisations ==
Regional cooperation through various multilateral organizations is a key element in Nauru's foreign policy. The country also hosted the regional meeting that resulted in the Nauru Agreement Concerning Cooperation in the Management of Fisheries of Common Interest whose eight signatories (including Nauru) collectively controls 25–30% of the world's tuna supply and approximately 60% of the western and central Pacific tuna supply. Additionally, Nauru is a full member of the Pacific Islands Forum, the South Pacific Applied Geoscience Commission, the Pacific Regional Environment Programme and the Secretariat of the Pacific Community.

== Hosting refugees ==
In 2001 Nauru became host to approximately 867 refugees, mostly Afghan, who were intercepted while attempting to enter Australia illegally. This exchange was one of many which were collectively known as Australia's Pacific Solution. In February 2008, the last of the refugees were resettled in Australia.

== Diplomatic relations ==
List of countries which Nauru maintains diplomatic relations with:

#	Country	Date
1	Japan	December 1972
2	New Zealand	24 July 1974
3	Belgium	4 July 1975
4	India	12 September 1975
6	Turkey	27 April 1976
7	Australia	24 October 1976
7	United States	24 October 1976
8	United Kingdom	1 December 1977
9	France	15 March 1978
10	Solomon Islands	7 July 1978
11	South Korea	20 August 1979
12	Samoa	1979
13	Vanuatu	30 July 1980
14	Fiji	1980
15	Chile	6 February 1981
16	North Korea	25 February 1982
17	Philippines	23 April 1982
18	Netherlands	26 October 1982
19	Peru	23 January 1984
20	Germany	20 September 1984
21	Greece	1 October 1984
22	Federated States of Micronesia	10 April 1987
23	Russia	30 December 1987
24	Malaysia	11 November 1988
25	Papua New Guinea	1988
26	Marshall Islands	22 February 1991
—	Holy See	1 June 1992
27	Palau	14 October 1994
28	Israel	December 1994
—	Cook Islands	1994
29	Spain	27 September 1995
30	Italy	27 February 1997
31	Canada	11 September 1997
32	Ireland	21 March 2000
33	Cyprus	23 March 2000
34	Maldives	9 May 2000
35	Norway	9 August 2000
36	Croatia	4 December 2000
37	Bulgaria	30 April 2001
38	Belarus	12 September 2001
39	Mexico	21 September 2001
40	Cuba	7 May 2002
41	China	21 July 2002
42	Switzerland	2003
43	Iceland	17 February 2004
44	Azerbaijan	11 November 2004
45	North Macedonia	2 December 2004
46	Thailand	14 January 2005
47	Brazil	2 November 2005
48	Austria	9 November 2005
49	Vietnam	21 June 2006
50	Guatemala	6 December 2006
51	Czech Republic	19 February 2007
52	United Arab Emirates	27 March 2007
53	Cambodia	25 April 2007
54	Venezuela	7 May 2007
55	Dominican Republic	28 September 2007
56	Malta	19 November 2008
57	Singapore	12 March 2009
58	Finland	24 March 2009
59	Portugal	9 September 2009
60	Luxembourg	21 May 2010
61	Morocco	9 September 2010
62	Egypt	25 September 2010
63	Montenegro	25 January 2011
64	Jamaica	24 February 2011
65	Romania	2 March 2011
66	Slovenia	11 March 2011
67	Uruguay	14 March 2011
68	Seychelles	14 April 2011
69	Albania	20 April 2011
70	Slovakia	24 June 2011
71	Lithuania	28 June 2011
72	Hungary	12 July 2011
73	Mongolia	13 October 2011
74	Estonia	21 March 2012
75	Gambia	27 September 2012
76	Sweden	28 September 2012
77	Indonesia	21 December 2012
78	Kuwait	9 April 2013
79	Poland	24 November 2014
80	Argentina	31 October 2016
81	Armenia	22 September 2017
82	Tajikistan	20 December 2017
83	Latvia	21 May 2018
—	Sovereign Military Order of Malta	5 October 2018
84	Serbia	25 September 2019
85	Nicaragua	18 October 2019
86	Kyrgyzstan	31 January 2020
87	Bahrain	4 May 2023
88	Nepal	4 May 2023
89	Saudi Arabia	7 November 2023
90	Monaco	21 May 2024
91	Benin	6 November 2024
92	Uzbekistan	20 March 2025
93	Oman	15 May 2025
94	Qatar	14 September 2026
95	Saint Lucia	16 September 2026
96	Georgia	21 September 2026
97	Kazakhstan	30 October 2026
98	Kiribati	Unknown
—	Niue	Unknown
99	Tonga	Unknown
100	Tuvalu	Unknown

== Bilateral relations ==
Country	Formal Relations Began	Notes
Australia	16 August 1968 at Representative level, 21 November 1972 upgraded to High Commission Level	See Australia–Nauru relations
People's Republic of China	21 July 2002 – 27 May 2005 (first); 24 January 2024 (second)	See China–Nauru relations The Republic of Nauru and the People's Republic of China established diplomatic relations on 21 July 2002, and resumed on 24 January 2024.
Cuba	7 May 2002	In the late 2000s, Nauru began to strengthen its relations with Cuba. Cuba provides medical aid to Nauru; an unspecified number of Cuban doctors are serving in Nauru. In June 2007, Nauru adopted the "Cuban literacy method", reportedly used also in several other countries. In October 2007, Nauruan Foreign Minister and Trade Minister David Adeang travelled to Cuba to strengthen relations between the two island nations. This led to the creation of a Cuba-Nauru Joint Intergovernmental Commission for Economic Cooperation. At approximately this time, Nauru-US relations underwent tensions for reasons which were not completely clear (See also: Foreign relations of Nauru#Ties with the United States of America, above). In September 2008, Nauru's foreign minister attended the first Cuba-Pacific Islands ministerial meeting in Havana, aimed at "strengthening cooperation" between Nauru and Cuba, notably on coping with the impact of climate change.
India	1975	See India-Nauru relations India established relations with the country since its independence in 1968 and have had numerous visits by presidents of Nauru to the Republic since then. India is one of the largest donors to the island by helping the education ministry and revamping the island's parliament facilities to its MP's and its Speaker. India has also reserved 5 slots for Naruran citizens for training courses under the Indian Technical & Economical Cooperation (ITEC) programme in the year 2010–11. One scholarship slot is also offered under General Cultural Scholarship of ICCR (Commonwealth Scheme).
Israel		See Israel–Nauru relations
Russia	30 December 1987	See Nauru–Russia relations Nauru's banks are said to have provided services to the mafia in Russia during the 1990s; over the course of the 1990s, approximately 70 billion U.S. dollars owned by Russian mafia were held in Nauru banks.
Republic of China (Taiwan)	4 May 1980 – 23 July 2002 (first); 14 May 2005 – 15 January 2024 (second)	See Nauru–Taiwan relations On 15 January 2024, Nauru severed diplomatic relations with the Republic of China (Taiwan) again, restored diplomatic relations with the People's Republic of China, and recognized "the People's Republic of China as the only legitimate government of China" and "Taiwan as part of the People's Republic of China." On 21 July 2002, Nauru broke diplomatic relations with Taiwan and established diplomatic relations with the People's Republic of China. In 2003, Nauru closed its embassy in Beijing. In April 2005, during a state visit to the Marshall Islands, ROC President Chen Shui-bian met and spoke with the Nauruan President Ludwig Scotty. On 14 May 2005, the two countries signed the necessary documents to restore formal ties and reopen embassies. On 15 January 2024, Nauru cut ties with the ROC.
Turkey	24 October 1976	Turkish ambassador in Canberra to Australia is also accredited to Nauru.; Trade volume between the two countries was negligible in 2018.
United Kingdom	2 February 1968	See Nauru–United Kingdom relations Nauru established diplomatic relations with the United Kingdom on 2 February 1992.: The United Kingdom is not accredited to Nauru through an embassy; the UK develops relations through its high commission in Honiara, Solomon Islands.; The United Kingdom was a signatory to the Nauru Island Agreement of 1919 and was a co-mandatory with Australia and New Zealand from 1919 to Nauru's independence in 1968, although Australia was responsible for the territory's administration. Both countries share common membership of the Commonwealth, the International Criminal Court, and the United Nations.
United States	24 October 1976	See Nauru–United States relations The Nauruan government has a very complex relationship with the United States; the government of Bernard Dowiyogo agreed to stop passport sales and offshore banking in return for an extensive aid package. According to the U.S. Department of State, Nauru has cordial relations with the United States The U.S. has no consular or diplomatic offices in Nauru. Officers of the American Embassy in Suva, Fiji, are concurrently accredited to Nauru and make periodic visits. In September 2007, David Adeang, Nauru's Foreign Minister, made a number of public statements in relation to the United States. He extolled Cuba and criticized US foreign policy, during a visit to the Caribbean island. Subsequently, the US Department of State, referring to events investigated in 2007, reported criticism of Adeang in its Human Rights Report, issued for 2008. This criticism was included in the State Department's report, despite the fact that police, having undertaken an investigation of allegations of wrongdoing, made no attempt to prosecute Adeang. Shortly after Adeang's public pronouncements, a crisis, with himself at the centre, led to the collapse of President of Nauru Ludwig Scotty's government. Trade between the United States and Nauru is limited by the latter's small size and economic problems. The value of two-way trade in 2005 was US$1.6 million. In October 2008 the new U.S. Ambassador to Fiji, also accredited to Nauru, pledged efforts to assist Nauru's economic development.

=== Other countries ===
In 1995, Nauru broke off relations diplomatic relations with France to protest French nuclear testing in the Pacific. Relations were resumed in 1997.

Nauru established diplomatic relations with Kosovo on 23 April 2008, which ended 13 November 2019 as Nauru withdrew its recognition. Nauru established diplomatic relations with Abkhazia on 15 December 2009, and with South Ossetia on 16 December 2009. However, on 21 July 2026, it withdrew recognition of these countries and severed relations.

== Relations with partially recognised states ==
Nauru has used its position as a member of the United Nations to gain financial support from both the Republic of China (ROC) and the People's Republic of China (PRC) by changing its position on the political status of Taiwan. During 2002, Nauru signed an agreement to establish diplomatic relations with the PRC on 21 July. Nauru accepted $130m from the PRC for this diplomatic move. In response, the ROC severed diplomatic relations with Nauru two days later. Nauru later re-established links with the ROC on 14 May 2005, and diplomatic ties with the PRC were officially severed on 31 May 2005. Similarly, Nauru recognized the Sahrawi Arab Democratic Republic on 12 August 1981. Then, on 15 September 2000, Nauru withdrew recognition of the SADR, and signed accords with Morocco on the phosphates area, which are running out in the island. In 2008, Nauru recognized Kosovo as an independent country, but withdrew its recognition in 2019. Additionally, in 2009, Nauru became only the fourth country to recognize the breakaway republics of Abkhazia and South Ossetia, which are both claimed by Georgia. Russia was reported to be giving Nauru $50m in humanitarian aid in return. Nauru established diplomatic relations with Abkhazia and South Ossetia on 15 and 16 December 2009, which were revoked on 21 July 2026. The Georgian Ministry of Foreign Affairs welcomed this fact and expressed its readiness to restore relations with Nauru.

== Missions in Nauru ==
- Australia (High Commission)
- People's Republic of China (Embassy)

== See also ==
- List of diplomatic missions in Nauru
- List of diplomatic missions of Nauru
