= List of ambassadors of Nauru to China =

Ambassador of Nauru to China
- Incumbent; Chitra Jeremiah since September 6, 2024

The Nauran ambassador in Beijing is the official representative of the Government of Nauru to the Government of China.

== List of representatives ==
=== Consuls to Taipei (1975–1995) ===
- Kelly Deouri Emiu (1975–1982)
- John B. Akubor (1982–)
- Willie Adam (–1989)
- Miniva Depaune (1989–1994)
- Nelson Eddie Scotty (1994–1995)

=== Ambassadors to Beijing (2003) ===
- Jack Sanders（Chargé d'affaires, April 2003–August 2003）

=== Ambassadors to Taipei (2005–2024) ===
- Ludwig Keke (2007–2016)
- Chitra Jeremiah (2016–2019)
- Jarden Kephas (2019–2024)

=== Ambassadors to Beijing (2024–present) ===
- Chitra Jeremiah (2024–present)

== See also ==
- China–Nauru relations
