= List of ambassadors of Nauru to Taiwan =

Coordinates: 25.117186°N 121.524064°E

Ambassador of Nauru to Taiwan
- Formation: February 5, 2005
- Final holder: Jarden Kephas
- Abolished: January 15, 2024

The Nauran ambassador in Taipei is the official representative of the Government in the Yaren District to the Government of Taiwan.

On January 15, 2024, Nauru renounced its diplomatic recognition of Taiwan, in favor of the People's Republic of China.

== List of representatives ==
Diplomatic agrément/Diplomatic accreditation	Image	ambassador	Observations	President of Nauru	List of premiers of the Republic of China	Term end
May 4, 1980			The governments in the Yaren District and Taipei maintained diplomatic relation.	Hammer DeRoburt	Sun Yun-suan	July 23, 2002
July 22, 2002			The governments in the Yaren District and Beijing maintained diplomatic relation.	René Harris	Zhu Rongji	May 27, 2005
May 24, 2005			The governments in Taipei and Yaren District established diplomatic relations.	Ludwig Scotty	Frank Hsieh	
March 1, 2007		Ludwig Keke	Ludwig Dowong Keke, first ambassador to Taiwan from Nauru, presented his credentials to Chen at the Office of the President. Father of Kieren Keke	Ludwig Scotty	Frank Hsieh	June 26, 2016
July 1, 2016		Chitra Jeremiah		Baron Waqa	Lin Chuan	June 2019
September 9, 2019		Jarden Kephas		Lionel Aingimea	Su Tseng-chang	January 15, 2024

== See also ==
- Nauru–Taiwan relations
