= List of diplomatic missions of Nauru =

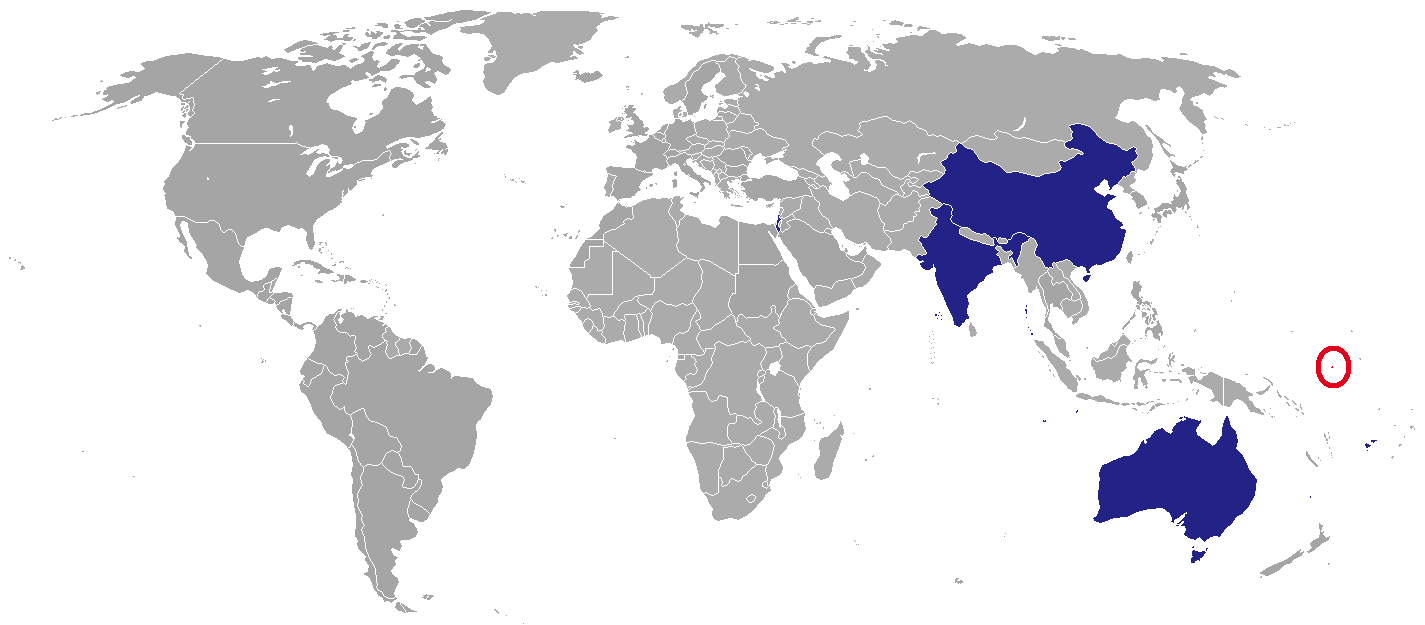
Diplomatic missions of Nauru

This is a list of diplomatic missions of Nauru, not including its honorary consulates.

Nauru is the smallest republic in the world. It was previously relatively wealthy from royalties collected from phosphate mining. This allowed the country of 12,000 to expand its public service workforce to 1,600.

Economic mismanagement has forced the Nauruan government to cut back on its overseas presence. With mounting debts it was forced to relinquish Nauru House in Melbourne, a 52-storey building owned by the Nauru government which housed its consulate-general. In a bid to stay solvent a covertly funded Nauran embassy was planned to be opened in Beijing as a transit point for defecting North Korean scientists (Operation Weasel).

== Asia ==
- China
  - Beijing (Embassy)
- India
  - New Delhi (High Commission)
- Israel
  - Jerusalem (Embassy)

== Oceania ==
- Australia
  - Canberra (High Commission)
  - Brisbane (Consulate General)
- Fiji
  - Suva (High Commission)

== Multilateral organisations ==
- United Nations
  - New York City (Permanent Mission) (Note: Also accredited to Guatemala.)

== Closed missions ==
| Host country | Host city | Mission | Year closed | Ref. |
|---|---|---|---|---|
| Japan | Tokyo | Consulate | 1989 | |
| Taiwan | Taipei | Embassy | 2024 | |
| Thailand | Bangkok | Consulate-General | 2025 | |
| United States | Washington, D.C. | Embassy | 2003 | |

== See also ==
- Foreign relations of Nauru
- Operation Weasel
- List of diplomatic missions in Nauru
