= Nauru–United Kingdom relations =

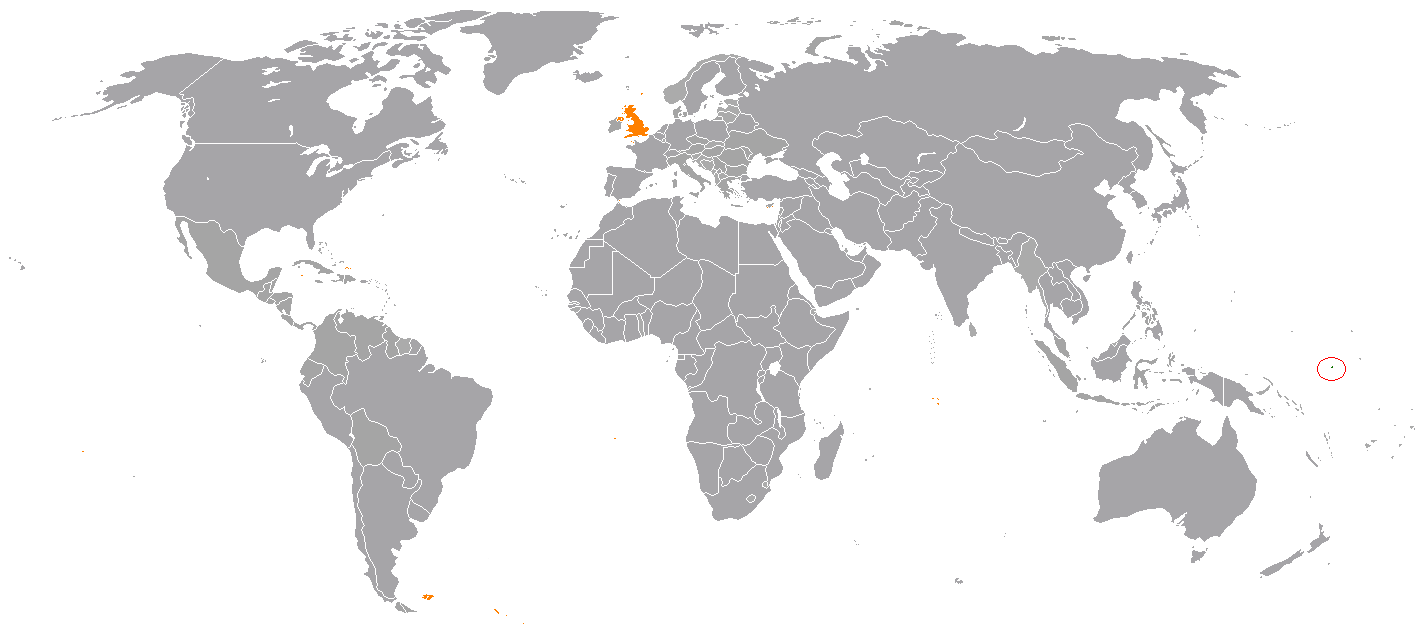

- Nauru: United Kingdom

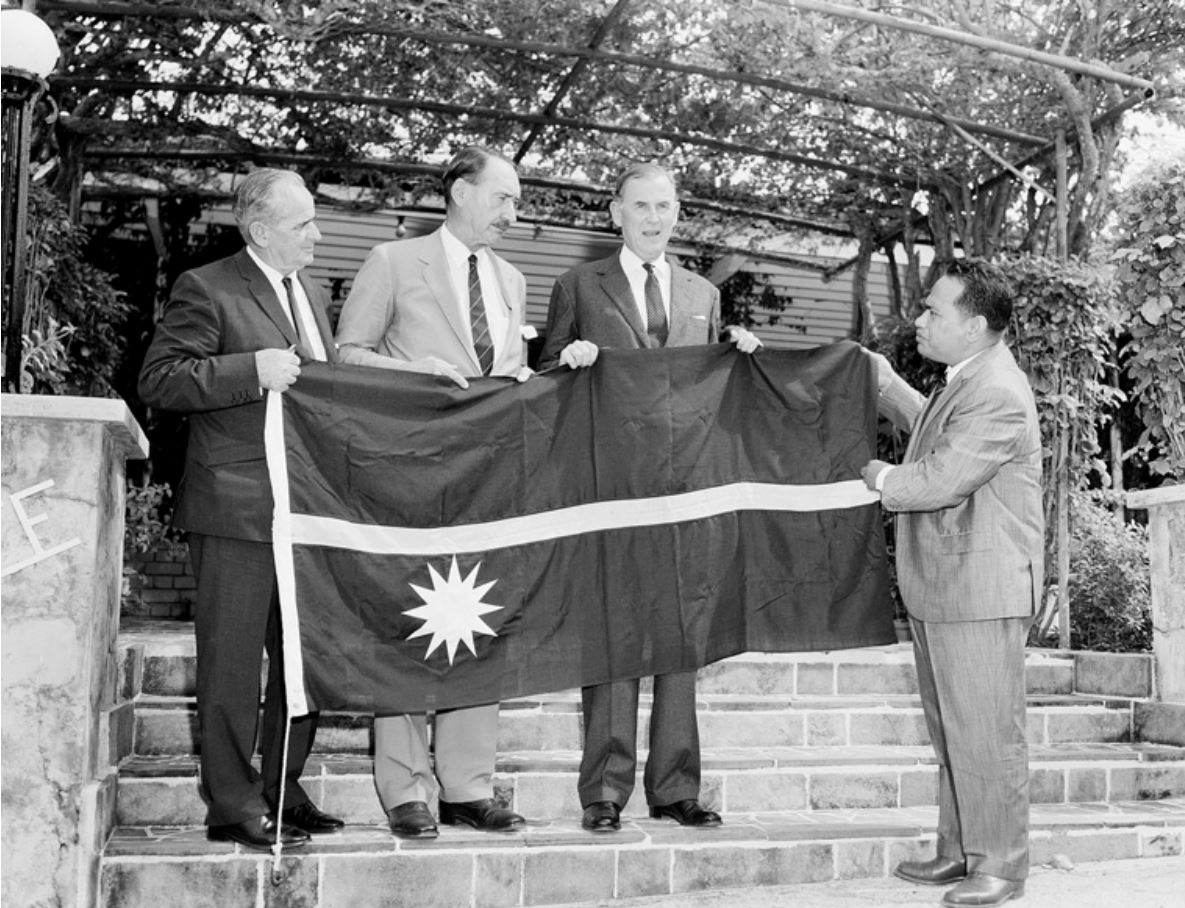
Representatives of the British Phosphate Commission with Nauruan President Hammer DeRoburt on Nauru Independence Day, January 1968.

Nauru–United Kingdom relations encompass the diplomatic, economic, and historical interactions between the Republic of Nauru and the United Kingdom of Great Britain and Northern Ireland.

Both countries share common membership of the Commonwealth, the International Criminal Court, and the United Nations.

== History ==
Nauru was annexed by Germany in 1888, but after World War I, the League of Nations granted a joint mandate over the island to Australia, New Zealand, and the United Kingdom. The Nauru Island Agreement of 1919 established the British Phosphate Commission to manage the island’s valuable phosphate resources, with the UK and Australia each receiving 42% and New Zealand 16%. After World War II, Nauru became a United Nations Trust Territory administered by Australia, with the UK as a co-trustee under the 1947 Trusteeship Agreement.

In the 1960s, Nauruans pressed for independence, purchasing the British Phosphate Commission’s assets in 1967. Nauru became an independent republic on 31 January 1968, with the UK supporting the transition.

== Economic relations ==
The UK, along with Australia and New Zealand, was party to the Nauru Island Agreement (1919) and the Trusteeship Agreement (1947), which shaped the island’s administration and phosphate industry.

Trade between the UK and Nauru is minimal. In the four quarters to the end of Q4 2024, total trade was £1 million, a decrease of 75% from the previous year. UK exports to Nauru were less than £1 million, while imports from Nauru were £1 million, primarily in services. Foreign direct investment between the two countries is negligible, with less than £500,000 in either direction as of 2023. Nauru ranks as the UK’s 222nd largest trading partner, accounting for less than 0.1% of UK trade.

Nauru has the legal right to make an accession request to join the Pacific States–United Kingdom Economic Partnership Agreement, a free trade agreement.

== Diplomatic missions ==
- Nauru does not maintain an embassy in the United Kingdom.
- The United Kingdom is not accredited to Nauru through an embassy; the UK develops relations through its high commission in Honiara, Solomon Islands.

== See also ==
- British Phosphate Commission
- Commonwealth of Nations
- Foreign relations of Nauru
- Foreign relations of the United Kingdom
- Pacific States–United Kingdom Economic Partnership Agreement
