= List of ambassadors of China to Nauru =

The Chinese ambassador to Nauru is the official representative of the People's Republic of China to the Republic of Nauru. From 2002 to 2005, Nauru had established ties with the People's Republic of China, before switching to recognize Taiwan. In 2024, Nauru switched its recognition back to the People's Republic of China.

== List of representatives ==
Diplomatic agrément/Diplomatic accreditation	Ambassador	Chinese language zh:中国驻瑙鲁大使列表	Observations	Premier of the People's Republic of China	President of Nauru	Term end
July 22, 2002			The governments in the Yaren District and Beijing maintained diplomatic relation.	Zhu Rongji	René Harris	2005
April 2003	Xu Shiguo	zh:许士国		Wen Jiabao	Ludwig Scotty	June 2004
June 2004	Cui Huixin	zh:崔惠欣		Wen Jiabao	René Harris	May 2005
Nauru recognizes Taiwan from 2005 to 2024. See List of ambassadors of the Republic of China to Nauru
July 2, 2024	Lyu Jin			Li Qiang	David Adeang	

== See also ==
- China–Nauru relations
