= List of diplomatic missions in Nauru =

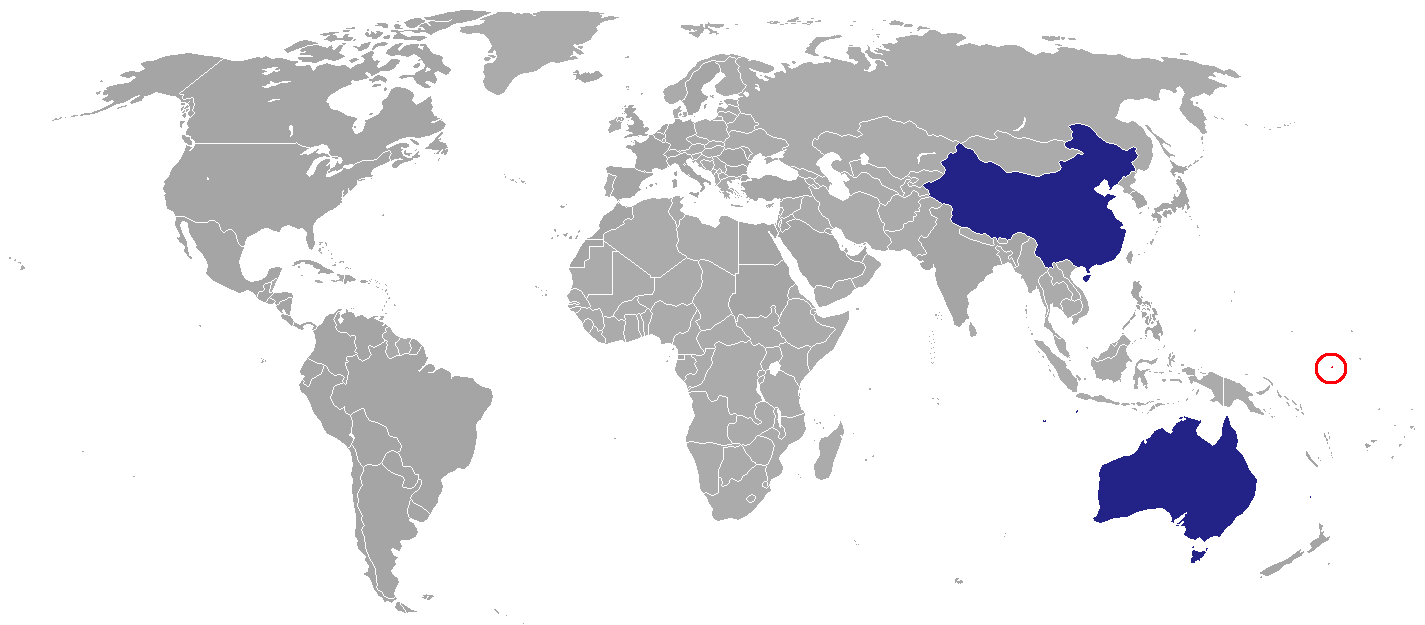
Diplomatic missions in Nauru

This is a list of diplomatic missions in Nauru. As the Nauruan government does not maintain a website devoted to external affairs, the information on this page has been gathered from the websites of the concerned foreign ministries. The de facto capital, Yaren, hosts two embassies.

== Embassies/High Commissions ==
=== Aiwo ===
- Australia

=== Yaren ===
- China

== Non-Resident Embassies/High Commissions ==
- Afghanistan (Canberra)
- Algeria (Canberra)
- Austria (Canberra)
- Belgium (Canberra)
- Benin (Tokyo)
- Brazil (Canberra)
- Brunei (Canberra)
- Cote d'Ivoire (Tokyo)
- Central African Republic (Bangui)
- Canada (Canberra)
- Colombia (Canberra)
- Czech Republic (Manila)
- Denmark (Canberra)
- Egypt (Tokyo)
- Finland (Canberra)
- France (Suva)
- Germany (Canberra)
- Guinea (Tokyo)
- Ghana (Tokyo)
- Haiti (Tokyo)
- Honduras (Tokyo)
- India (Suva)
- Indonesia (Suva)
- Iran (Tokyo)
- Ireland (Canberra)
- Israel (non-resident in Jerusalem)
- Italy (Canberra)
- Iraq (Tokyo)
- Jordan (Tokyo)
- Jamaica (Tokyo)
- Japan (Suva)
- Kuwait (Tokyo)
- Kenya (Canberra)
- Kyrgyzstan (Tokyo)
- Laos (Tokyo)
- Libya (Tokyo)
- Lesotho (Tokyo)
- Lebanon (Tokyo)
- Lithuania (Tokyo)
- Mali (Tokyo)
- Maldives (Tokyo)
- Malaysia (Suva)
- Mexico (Kuala Lumpur)
- Nicaragua (Tokyo)
- Norway (Canberra)
- Netherlands (Canberra)
- New Zealand (Suva)
- Pakistan (Tokyo)
- Portugal (Canberra)
- Poland (Canberra)
- Philippines (Canberra)
- Russia (Canberra)
- Serbia (Tokyo)
- Seychelles (New York City)
- South Africa (Canberra)
- Sierra Leone (Seoul)
- Saudi Arabia (Canberra)
- South Korea (Suva)
- Sudan (Tokyo)
- Thailand (Canberra)
- Togo (Tokyo)
- Turkmenistan (Tokyo)
- Turkey (Canberra)
- Tunisia (Tokyo)
- Tajikistan (Tokyo)
- United Kingdom (Honiara)
- United States (Suva)
- United Arab Emirates (Tokyo)
- Uzbekistan (Tokyo)
- Vietnam (Canberra)
- Yemen (Canberra)
- Zambia (Tokyo)
- Zimbabwe (Tokyo)

== Former embassies ==
- Republic of China (Taiwan)
- Abkhazia (Representative office)
- South Ossetia (Representative office)

== See also ==
- Foreign relations of Nauru
- List of diplomatic missions of Nauru
