= Nauruan passport =

Passport of the Republic of Naoero issued to Nauruan citizens

- Nauruan passport front cover

- Picture page of a Nauruan passport
- Type: Passport
- Issued by: Nauru
- Purpose: Identification
- Eligibility: Nauruan citizenship

The Nauruan passport is an international travel document that is issued to citizens of Nauru.

As of September 21st, 2025, Nauruan citizens had visa-free or visa-on-arrival access to 86 countries and territories, ranking the Nauruan passport 59th in terms of travel freedom according to the Henley Passport Index.

== History ==
At the turn of the 21st century, the State of Nauru went bankrupt and started to sell its passports.

In 2026, to fund climate adaptation projects, Nauru launched immigrant investor programs, selling the Nauruan citizenship and a Nauruan passport for $90,000. Such previous schemes launched by the island had been criticized for lack of control.

== See also ==
- Visa requirements for Nauruan citizens
