= History of wireless telegraphy and broadcasting in Nauru =

The history of wireless telegraphy and broadcasting in Nauru is characterised by changes in which states governed the island over time. It follows a shift from early twentieth-century proposals for Pacific wireless links to a high-power Telefunken station completed in 1913, which was seized in 1914 and later operated under a League of Nations mandate. Communications were disrupted again during wartime and then rebuilt, and domestic broadcasting developed around independence in 1968, later moving from AM to FM broadcasting, including the launch of Radio Pasifik Nauru in 2007 with support from the University of the South Pacific.

== Political background ==
During the wireless era, the island country of Nauru saw a variety of colonial rulers. It was annexed by Germany in 1888 and incorporated into the Marshall Islands protectorate. Following the outbreak of World War I, the island was captured by Australian troops in 1914. The Nauru Island Agreement made in 1919 between the governments of the United Kingdom, Australia and New Zealand provided for the administration of the island and for working of the phosphate deposits by an intergovernmental British Phosphate Commission (BPC). The terms of the League of Nations Mandate were drawn up in 1920, but it was not till 1923, that the League of Nations gave Australia a trustee mandate over Nauru, with the United Kingdom and New Zealand as co-trustees. Japanese troops occupied Nauru in mid-1942. The Japanese garrison surrendered to Australian troops in September 1945. In 1947, a trusteeship was established by the United Nations, with Australia, New Zealand, and the United Kingdom as trustees. Nauru became self-governing in January 1966, and following a two-year constitutional convention it became independent in 1968.

== Pacific Islands Radio Telegraph Company proposal ==
The earliest reference to the possibility of a wireless station at Nauru is September 1908, when an English syndicate by the name of Pacific Islands Radio Telegraph Company proposed the establishment of a wide chain of stations across the South Pacific:

LINKING THE PACIFIC. COMPLETE WIRELESS SERVICE. A VALUABLE SCHEME. BENEFIT TO SHIPPING. In the cable news yesterday was an item to the effect that the "New 'York Herald" announced that a plan was taking shape to link the important islands of the Pacific by wireless telegraphy. This referred, no doubt, to the scheme proposed by the Pacific Islands Radio Telegraph Company, an English syndicate, whereby not only would the wireless system be installed on the various islands, but connection would also be made between Australia and New Zealand. The company has been working on the scheme for some months, and it is understood that their suggestions are meeting with the favourable consideration of the various Governments concerned. It is intended to thoroughly cover Oceania. Every island or group of importance will be provided with a radio-telegraphic station. The exact location of all these stations has not yet been disclosed, but it is known definitely that among the points selected are Fiji, Samoa, New Hebrides, Solomon, Marshall, Caroline, Gilbert, Fanning, Sandwich, Tahiti, Tonga, and New Guinea. It is also on the cards that the Pacific Phosphates Company will have the installation carried out on their possessions. Ocean and Pleasant Islands. The promoters of the scheme are meeting with every encouragement, and by the end of the year it is anticipated that a start will be made with active preparations for installing the service. The company is to maintain communication, and for so doing is asking the various Governments controlling the places to be benefited, to support the service. It is understood that the Fijian authorities have proposed to pay a large sum for the installation of the service on the principal islands under their jurisdiction. Other islands have agreed to co-operate with the company, but nothing has yet been decided with regard to the two most important centres, Australia and New Zealand, without which the scheme would be incomplete. The matter has been considered by the Governments of the Commonwealth and the Dominion, and it is an open secret that the proposal has been favourably received. The question will be placed before the Federal Parliament when it meets, and should the scheme be approved of, and New Zealand be willing, no time will be lost in getting on with the work of linking up the scattered groups. It has been decided to make Suva the head-quarters in the Pacific, and from there the messages will be flashed on to Australia and New Zealand. In the Pacific the scheme is being strongly supported, as it is well known that there is little chance of a cable service between the scattered islands being installed. Traders recognise the necessity of a faster means of communication than they now possess, and once the system is started it will not be long before every island of importance is connected. In addition to the scheme proving most valuable from a commercial point of view, it will be of considerable assistance to meteorologists in forecasting the weather, as daily reports can be sent from the outlying parts giving warning of sudden changes, which will enable traders and others to prepare for the hurricanes which prove so disastrous in the islands. Then, again, it is claimed that the system will prove of valuable assistance in the matter of defence, as with stations scattered all over the Pacific, a hostile fleet will have little chance of getting close to Australia without being seen. Apart from the increased convenience to be derived from a radio service through the islands, such an installation will be of financial benefit to the Commonwealth. It is intended to transmit all messages received at Fiji from the other islands to Sydney and New Zealand by means of the Pacific Company's cable. This will materially increase the earnings of that body and the Federal Government will not be called upon to make up such a large deficiency as it does at present. It is not intended to utilise the radio service between Fiji and Australia except as an emergency, as once a cable is installed the wireless system cannot profitably compete with it. However, a wireless station will be put in close proximity to the cable station, and should the latter service be interrupted by any means, communication can be maintained with the new system. Another important feature of the scheme is its value to the shipping industry. With radio stations scattered about the Pacific Ocean and on the Australian and New Zealand coasts, the shipping companies will be able to install apparatus on their boats, and thus be able to maintain communication con-stantly with the shore. In fact, negotiations have been carried on between the Union Steamship Company and the Pacific Islands Radio Telegraphic Company with regard to the installation of the service on their liners, and it is understood that directly the island scheme is settled, all the New Zealand and island boats will be fitted with apparatus. This would prove of considerable convenience to shipping people, besides being a safeguard against such accidents as might easily befall a vessel drifting about disabled, as the Hawea did last month. The system of wireless telegraphy to be used in linking up the islands is the Poulson. This is the latest invention, being an arc system instead of a spark. The company originally used the De Forest idea, but as it found the Poulson to be much more reliable and less expensive, it altered all its stations, and installed the Danish invention. The system has been found to be thoroughly efficient. Several lines of steamers are fitted with it, and messages have been received from a distance of 2500 miles. A thoroughly competent operator can send as many as a hundred words a minute through the air, but the average sending speed is 30 words a minute.

The loss of the Aeon in September 1908 was just one of many shipping losses in the maritime history of the Pacific, but the extraordinarily long time before the loss could be confirmed was used as leverage to progress the proposal of the Pacific Islands Radio Telegraph Company. Further support to the Pacific Islands Radio Telegraph Company proposal was offered in October 1908 by the Bureau of Manufacturers of the United States. It was noted that of the proposed capital of £70,000 the owners of the phosphate deposits on Ocean and Pleasant Islands have subscribed £10,000 and that it has not yet been decided where the main office of the proposed company will be.

Despite a clear disposition by the Australian Government for a Postmaster-General's Department controlled and operated network of coastal stations, the Government came out, at least in principle, in favour of the Pacific Islands Radio Telegraph Company scheme:

LINKING THE PACIFIC. WIRELESS TELEGRAPHY SCHEME. COMMONWEALTH GOVERNMENT APPROVES. An important scheme for linking Australia and New Zealand with many of the principal islands of the Pacific has received the preliminary approval of the Commonwealth Prime Minister, and negotiations are now proceeding between Mr. Deakin and Sir Joseph Ward with the object of defining formally the relations of the two Governments and the business men who are backing the project. The scheme is the child of an English syndicate, the Pacific Islands Radio Telegraph Company, whose representative, Mr. Hamilton, had several interviews with Mr. Deakin when he was in Melbourne a few months ago. The plans of the syndicate are comprehensive, and are said to be viewed with favor by the imperial authorities, as well as by the two Australasian Governments. Every importaunt island or group in Oceania is to be linked with Australia and New Zealand, and the location of radio-telegraphic stations at the principal strategic and commercial centres is already under discussion. It is definitely known that among the islands selected are Fiji, the New Hebrides, the Marshalls, Samoa, the Solomons, the Carolines, the Gilberts, Sandwich, Tonga, Fanning Island, Tahiti, Papua. It is also said to be probable that the Pacific Phosphates Company will have an installation of plant at their depots on Ocean and Pleasant islands. It is further stated that the Government of Fiji has promised to pay a large sum for sub-installations at the small islands under its jurisdiction. The British authorities in other islands have promised similar co-operation. So sanguine are the promoters of success that when certain negotiations in London are complete they propose to make arrangements for the installations to be made early in January, 1909. It has been decided to make Suva the head quarters in the Pacific, and to join the Oceanic wireless services with the cable service of the Pacific Cable Board. Communications have passed between the Union Steamship Company and the syndicate, and it was announced last week in New Zealand that directly the islands scheme is settled all the company's boats will be fitted with wireless apparatus. The New Zealand Government is pressing for an extension of the scheme, so as to embrace the establishment of stations on the Auckland and Chatham Islands. The Australian Prime Minister, when seen on Thursday, said that he was generally favorable to the scheme, but the details had yet to be fully discussed. He had written to Sir Joseph Ward on the matter and expected an answer by any mail.

The formation of the Pacific-Radio Telegraph Company was announced in February 1909:

AUSTRALIA AND THE ISLANDS. WIRELESS COMMUNICATION. A COMPANY FORMED. LONDON, Wednesday Afternoon.— The Pacific-Radio Telegraph Company has been formed, with a registered capital of £60,000, to provide inter-communication between the islands in the Pacific and Australia and New Zealand. The "Western Electrician," of Chicago, recently said, with reference to the movement to connect groups of islands in the Pacific by a system of radiotelegraphy:— "It is proposed to include in this system Australia, New Zealand, and the Fiji group, as well as the New Hebrides, the Solomon, Samoan, Cook, Society, and Mar-quesas Islands, and the phosphate islands of Ocean, Pleasant, and Makatea. "It is expected that the various Governments having possessions in the South Pacific will aid in the establishment of the proposed system. Negotiations have already proceeded so far that the success of the efforts seems to be almost assured, says Mr. J. D. Dreher, the United States Consul in Tahiti. As the nearest available ocean-cable office to Tahiti is at Auckland, 2250 miles away, from which a steamship arrives at Papeete once every 28 days, and a direct communication by steamship with San Francisco, 3658 miles distant, is had once in every 36 days, it will be understood how deeply interested the French colony of Tahiti and its dependencies are in the complete success of these negotiations. "The name of the proposed company is the Pacific Islands Radio-Telegraph Company. Of the proposed capital, of 340,000 dollars, the owners of the phosphate deposits on Ocean and Pleasant Islands have subscribed about one-seventh. In this radial system there will probably be 10 or 12 circles, the largest having a radius of 1250 miles, and requiring for each station an engine of 60 horse-power. It has not yet been decided where the main office of the proposed company, will be."

Further detail of the proposal emerged in March 1909:

LINKING THE ISLANDS. The "Wireless" Scheme, STATIONS TO BE FITTED UP. It transpires that the scheme for linking up the islands of the Pacific by wireless telegraph is that of an English syndicate — the Pacific Islands Radio Telegraph Co. Every important island in the South Pacific is to be linked with Australia and New Zealand, and the location of the radio telegraph station at the principal strategic and commercial centres is already under discussion. Among the islands selected are Fiji, the New Hebrides, Marshalls, Samoa, the Solomons, Carolines, Gilberts, Sandwich, Tonga, Fanning Island, Tahiti, and Papua. It is also said to be probable that the Pacific Phosphates Co. will have an installation of plant at their depots on Ocean and Pleasant Islands. It is further stated that the Government of Fiji has promised to pay a large sum for subinstallation at the small islands under its jurisdiction, and that the British authorities in the other islands have promised similar co-operation. When certain negotiations in London are complete, the promoters propose to make arrangements for the installation to be made early in January, 1903 [sic, 1913?]. It has been decided to make Suva the headquarters in the Pacific, and to join the Oceanic wireless service with the cable service of the Pacific Cable Board.

The details of the proposal and its backers were more fully fleshed out in a report of August 1909:

LINKING UP THE PACIFIC. THE WIRELESS TELEGRAPHY SCHEME. Brief reference was made in "The Age" yesterday to a scheme for linking up the South Pacific Islands by wireless telegraphy, Mr. J. T. Hamilton, the representative of the Anglo-Australian syndicate, which, by the way, is backed by Earl Crawford, Sir James Mills, Sir Sidney Hutchison, Colonel James Burns and Mr. J. T. Rundle, is now in Melbourne, and called on several Federal Ministers with the object of placing his plans before them. Ministers are, on general principles, sympathetic, but until the budget statement is delivered on Thursday it is impossible to say how far sympathy is to be supported by action. In its earlier stages the scheme as a whole was watched with interest by the Federal Government, though of course no promises of aid were given. The syndicate has behind it a capital of about £60,000, but it is understood that unless the Australian, New Zealand, German and French Governments interested in the South Pacific Islands extend to its pioneer work some form of assistance its operations will be severely restricted, if not rendered altogether impossible. The scheme put forward for linking up the islands include groups of wireless telegraph stations arranged as follows:— GROUP I.— Proposed Long Distance Stations: Ocean Island, Levuka (Fiji). GROUP II.— Government Stations: Pleasant Island, Tahiti, Raratonga, Tonga, Vila (New Hebrides). GROUP III.— (Other Government stations, not essential to present scheme, but desirable from the point of view of certain Governments): Port Moresby, Samarai, Southport (Queensland), Doubtless Bay (New Zealand). GROUP IV.— Supplementary Stations: Norfolk Island, Lord Howe Island, Vaya, Pago Pago, Jaluit (Marshall Islands), Tarawa (Gilbert Islands), Herbertshohe (German New Guinea), Ponape, Gavutu (Solomon Islands). Although in due course the project is expected to pay its way on commercial lines, it commends itself to many members of the Federal Parliament on grounds which are far removed from considerations of cash profit and loss. Under present conditions a hostile fleet could hide amongst the South Pacific Islands for months waiting for a chance to descend upon Australia, and the Commonwealth would have no means of learning of the fleet's existence. To link the islands by cable will be impracticable for a generation. To do so by wireless telegraph installations is a matter of a few months.

There was apparent progress with the proposal of the Pacific-Radio Telegraph Company in September 1909:

WIRELESS IN POLYNESIA. Steps are being taken to install the wireless system in Polynesia. News was received by the Canadian mail steamer Marama that Mr. Arundel, one of the directors of the Pacific Radio and Electric Company, recently visited Honolulu in connection with the scheme, and extended an offer to Mr. S. A. Phelps, at present wireless operator, on board the mail steamer Alameda, to go to Ocean Island, Pleasant Island, and the Fijis, and install wireless outfits. Mr. Phelps will probably go to Vancouver and take the Canadian Pacific line to Fiji, where he will establish his headquarters, and within a few months the dots on the map which are now geographical mysteries to the junior class in geography will become as much within the ken of civilised countries as Sydney. Mr. Phelps is one of the most prominent among the wireless operators of the United Wireless Company. Several months ago he broke the long distance record for ship's wireless communication, talking with the Mariposa over several thousand miles of ocean. He will have complete charge of the proposed island wireless system, and will superintend the installation of the various instruments in the various stations.

== German South Sea Company for Wireless Telegraphy ==
In late July 1912, there were preliminary reports of plans for a chain of high power coastal stations in the German Pacific territories. It was stated that the German Government had granted a concession to the Telefunken Company and the German and Netherlands Telegraph Company for the installation and working of four large coastal wireless stations on the Telefunken system for the purpose of linking up the German possessions in the Pacific. The network was to include two stations in New Guinea and one each at Samoa and Island of Nauru. More details of the new chain of coastal stations were revealed in September 1912, with each of these stations to be fitted with a heavy iron tower 394 ft. in height and a power installation of at least 120 h.p. In lieu of a second station in New Guinea, the fourth station was to be at Yap (Caroline Islands) which was already connected to the German and Netherlands cable station there. A company was to be formed to work the stations, and several engineers of the Telefunken Company were to visit Rabaul and Yap at an early date. It was expected that the first two stations would be ready by April 1, 1913. Again in September 1912, when further details of the German proposal were revealed in the British Press, unfavourable comparisons were drawn with the costs and conditions of Marconi's Imperial Wireless Telegraph Scheme. These comparisons extended to questions in the English House of Commons. A Berlin report in the "Times" stated that a driver for the establishment of the network was the then need to use cable lines in foreign hands.

In October 1912, it was reported a quantity of gear for the station at Nauru, had been shipped by the steamer Australian Transport, which sailed from Sydney today direct for the islands. A December 1912 The Sun noted that a company called the German South Sea Company for Wireless Telegraphy had been formed with a capital of 3,250,000 dollars for the German Pacific network. The company had obtained a concession for twenty years from the Imperial Post Office, which was to be represented in the company by a commissary. In the 1924 Australian report to the Permanent Mandates Commission of the League of Nations, detail as to the earlier acquisition of land for the wireless station was provided noting that about 100 acres had been acquired by the German Government from native owners. The land was now dealt with as being owned by the Administration. In October 1913, the steamer Ellerlie brought news to Sydney that the Nauru wireless station was completed at the end of last month, and a wireless expert had taken up his residence on the island.

The official commencement of service of the Nauru station was advised as 1 December 1913. The immediate commercial value of the Nauru wireless station was apparent with the receipt in Sydney of a wireless message from Nauru advising that the Norwegian steamer Frithjof was to leave there yesterday for Sydney with a full cargo of phosphates. Proof of the efficient operation of the Nauru wireless station, as well as its strategic value was provided in a note that in November 1913, the German cruiser Nuernberg, when in far eastern waters, succeeded in achieving some remarkable results as regards long-distance communication by wireless. Communication with Nauru was established over 5000 nautical miles while the cruiser was in the Bismarck Archipelago. In May 1914 the Nauru wireless station played a part in salvage and rescue operations of the SS Cairnhill when it snapped a propeller shaft 4 days out from Nauru with a full load of phosphate. The Australian Postmaster-General's Department announced acceptance of telegraphic traffic for Nauru on 21 May 1914. In a press report of 6 June 1914, the arrival of Telefunken's Herman Kaspar in Sydney was announced, stating that he would be departing in about three weeks time to inspect the Nauru station. Australasian Wireless (the Australian Telefunken agent) as now merged with the Marconi company and had strong interest in merchant shipping wireless fitouts.

== World War I ==
The strategic potential of the wireless station was demonstrated at the outbreak of war, when the high power wireless station at Nauru enabled the Germans to take precautionary measures long before the British in the Pacific Islands knew of the true position. Small German steamers were despatched from Nauru, and these carried news of the war to the Germans in the Marshall Islands and the outlying Caroline Islands. The British SS Induna, which was going her usual round in the Marshall Islands, and a Japanese steamer, were seized by a German warship before the merchant vessels gained knowledge of the war.

At dawn on 11 September 1914, a landing party of 21 sailors from one of the Australian warships, under the command of Lieutenant-Commander Bloomfield, Lieutenant Cooper and Engineer-Lieutenant Creswell, and Staff-Surgeon Brennand, who acted as interpreter, landed on Nauru without opposition. (The island was neither fortified nor garrisoned). Possession was then taken, and two wireless operators were arrested. The wireless station, one of the most powerful in the German Pacific chain, and erected at a cost of £25,000, was destroyed. After this, a cruiser cleared out with the two operators as prisoners.

In a publication dated May 1915, List of Radio Stations of the World by Frank A. Hart (Chief Inspector, Marconi Wireless Telegraph Company of America) and H. M. Short (Resident Inspector (U.S.A.), Marconi International Marine Communication Co., Ltd.), the coastal wireless station at Nauru is listed under Marshall Islands with Callsign KBN but no technical details. Control is stated as "Operated and controlled by the Deutsche Sudsee-gesellschaft fur drahtlose Telegraphic, A. G., Berlin, Germany." The authors would have been aware that the station was now in possession of Australia; however, the US at that stage was still neutral and protocol would likely require pre-War status to be reflected. Australia would not have made use of the German callsign series and it is likely that use of the VKT callsign was implemented soon after the capture

In January 1915, soon after the recapture of Nauru, Australian newspapers reported that the Nauru wireless station had been reopened, with service limited at present, and subject to delays, also that traffic will be confined at present to messages to and from the Australia, no messages being exchanged with ship stations. Despite WW1 continuing to rage in Europe, the situation in the Pacific had stabilised to the point where Australia sought tenders for a regular merchant shipping service including Nauru in February 1915. It was specified that all ships must be equipped with wireless telegraphy.

== Postmaster-General's Department, Australia (1) ==
In a long report describing life and conditions at Nauru in April 1921, brief reference is made to the ongoing wireless facilities:

Away up on a hill about a mile and a quarter distant from the Phosphate Co.'s settlement, is the famous Telefunken high-power wireless station, which keeps in daily touch with the world in general. Daily bulletins of war news used to be issued by the officer in charge to residents, free of charge. The chief engineer of the station is another West Australian named Caisley, who worked his way up from a private to the position he now occupies. The wireless mast at Nauru is much about the same height as the one at Applecross, and can be seen by ships at sea for hours before the island itself comes into view.

== Amalgamated Wireless (A/asia) ==
A single set of test transmissions using wireless telephony between Nauru and Ocean Island was undertaken in January 1923:

RADIO TELEPHONY. IN USE AT NAURU PROSPHATES FOR 200 YEARS. Talking by wireless telephone, Mr. H. B. Pope, Australian Commissioner on the British Phosphate Commission, was distinctly heard at Nauru Island from Ocean Island, and vice versa, and through receiving sets 1600 miles away. Mr. Pope and Mr. A. F. Ellis, New Zealand's member of the commission, are in Sydney conferring as to development of the phosphate industry. During his last visit to the islands, Mr. Pope was accompanied by Mr. Hoskines, a special officer sent by courtesy of Amalgamated Wireless, Ltd. They took a wireless telephony set on the Nauru Chief, and found it so successful that the establishment of wireless telephone stations on the two islands is contemplated, radio telephony having proved so much in advance of radio telegraphy.

The News (Hobart) reported in May 1925 upon what is believed to be the first installation of wireless telephony facilities at Nauru:

A half K.W. wireless telephony set recently supplied by Amalgamated Wireless (Australasia) Limited to the British Phosphate Commission at Nauru, is giving exceptionally good results. Reports to hand state that tests between the set at Nauru and the radio station at Bita Paka (Rabaul). a distance of nearly 900 miles, resulted in good speech both ways during daylight.

This facility was not administratively part of the existing Coastal Radio station VKT (a public traffic facility), but rather a private operation, solely for the use of the British Phosphate Commission with the licence being held by the Administrator of Nauru. It is not known whether the two facilities were co-located with VKT.

There were few English language stations to listen to at night on Nauru and the wireless officers would have appreciated the strong new signals from 4QG Brisbane when it increased power from 500 watts to 5 kW in March 1926:

For Wireless Fans. 4QG. MORE EXCELLENT REPORTS. ON NEW POWER RESULTS. During the weekend further reports of reception from the new station (4QG) came to hand from many parts of Australia. So heavy was the mail received that it was found necessary to employ the full clerical staff on Saturday and Sunday, acknowledging by card the various telegrams and letters. Sunday's full programme was transmitted on high power, and was the first daylight test from the new station. Yesterday telegrams from the north and western portions of Queensland reported excellent results, and from Sydney and Melbourne clear reception was also reported. As reported in yesterday's "Standard," the wireless officer of steamer Makambo, which at the time was off the New Hebrides, radiogramed station 4QG on Sunday night, to the effect that he was receiving the band concert very clearly, and at great volume, on a single valve set. The radio station at Nauru also wirelessed a report yesterday stating that 4QG was being received at maximum strength.

In October 1926, the RAAF was anticipating major growth in aerial traffic in the Australian territories of the SW Pacific. A full survey of all facilities was undertaken by Group-captain Williams and his staff with a view to assisting with aeronautical navigation:

AID TO AVIATION. The survey of the mandated territory now being made by Group-captain Williams and staff of the Royal Australian Air Force, directs attention to the advantage of wireless to aviation, and the important part it is bound to play in the development of aerial services in the immediate future. As a matter of fact, wireless forms the only means of communication between many of the islands of the Pacific now under the suzerainty of Australia and the outside world. There are in all seventeen commercial and four private wireless stations in the islands adjacent to the Australian coast. In the Australian mandated territory of New Guinea there are seven radio stations controlled and operated by Amalgamated Wireless (Australasia), Limited. These are situated at Rabaul, Morobe, Madang, Aitape, Manus, Kavieng, and Kieta. There are two stations in the British Solomon islands, one at Tulagi and the other at Ocean Island, both of which are operated under the control of the British High Commissioner at Suva. The station in the mandated island of Nauru is controlled by the Administrator of Nauru, who also controls a private station on that island. The Japanese Government controls radio stations at the following points in the Japanese mandated territory of the Caroline Islands:— Truk, Ponape, Jaluit, Saipan, Yap, Paloa, and Angaur Island. A private radio station at Roviana is operated by Rev. Mr. Goldie, of the Solomon Islands Methodist Mission. A private station at Tarawa is operated by Burns, Philp, and Co., Ltd.; and one at Vanikoro is operated by the San Cristobal Estates, Tulagi. The station at Rabaul ranks as a high power station, and it receives and transmits all the traffic between Australia and the north and west Pacific Islands, including those of the British Solomons and the mandated territory of Japan in the Caroline Islands. This station was originally erected by Germany, and was captured by the Australians in 1914 under romantic and exciting circumstances. It has been remodelled on the lines of the stations controlled by Amalgamated Wireless, Limited, and is capable of handling almost continuous news and commercial traffic. It will thus be seen that Captain Williams will not be out of touch with headquarters at Melbourne during the period of his survey unless there should be a mishap to his wireless apparatus. His trip will do much to emphasise the commercial importance of radio in the development of the resources of the Pacific islands, as well as the more remote portions of the Australian continent.

This report makes clear the two distinct lines of control for the public traffic coastal station VKT and the BPC's private traffic station.

Wireless telephony was used in smaller vessels due to its lesser requirements for operating skill, illustrated by the March 1935 report in the Labor Daily (Sydney):

The British Phosphate Commissioners' new motor vessel Triaster, which has started on her maiden voyage to Australia, was in touch, by short wave radio, with the Sydney station of Amalgamated Wireless yesterday from the Bay of Biscay. In view of the circumstances of the phosphate trade, the Triaster has been fitted with facilities for wireless telephony which enables the captain to communicate with his offices at Nauru and Ocean Island.

In May 1935, following the "King's Speech," the Nauruan branch of the Royal Empire Society participated in an empire-wide expression of loyalty, whereby all Society branches despatched messages gathered together by the Sydney coastal station VIS which were then forwarded in facsimile form by the Beam Wireless station and delivered in the United Kingdom:

LOYALTY. JUBILEE ADDRESS. EMPIRE CIRCLE. WONDER OF RADIO. BEFORE its transmission to London by Beam Wireless in facsimile early this morning, the Royal Empire Society's Jubilee address to the King had already circled the Empire — a snowball of goodwill gathering loyal greetings as it travelled. It was a message from an Empire, linked not only by the common bonds of kinship, but by the wonders of modern communication — a message that united East and West, the old world and the new, in a tribute of loyalty to the British Throne. From Sydney to Rabaul, to Hongkong and the East, to Alexandria via India, to Durban and London, and back to Sydney via New Zealand, the message had flashed, returning by picturegram transmission to London this morning. From the New South Wales branch of the Royal Empire Society the idea of the "Around the Empire" message — a striking commentary on the advance made in Empire communication during the King's reign — originated. A message was prepared, with the signature of the president (Sir Hugh Denison) attached, and by means of radio, cable and other means of communication was started out on its long journey round the world. Endorsed By Empire At each Empire centre where the message was received it was endorsed by the following representatives of the Royal Empire Society:— Dr. W. N. Robertson (Brisbane), Sir James W. Barrett (Melbourne), Sir Henry S. Newland (Adelaide), Gordon Thomas (Rabaul), Hon. Sir H. E. Pollock (Hongkong), G. A. Bambridge (Madras), J. A. Tarbat (Colombo), Lieutenant-Colonel J. B. Barron (Alexandria), J. R. T. Cramp-ton (Durban), Professor Sir Augustus Bartolo (Malta), Arthur O. Carrara (Gibraltar), Sir Archibald Weigall, K.C.M.G. (Chairman of the council, London), W. Tees Curren (Montreal), G. Kingsley-Roth (Suva), Professor F. P. Worley (Auckland), A. E. Flower (Christchurch), Rupert C. Garsia (Nauru). On reaching Sydney again, the messages were assembled and transmitted by Beam Wireless in facsimile to Buckingham Palace. The message reads as follows:— May it please Your Majesty, the fellows of the Royal Empire Society, assembled in their respective domiciles throughout Your Majesty's Empire, pray Your Majesty to accept this expression of their deep affection and unswerving loyalty. They rejoice with all your subjects on the occasion of Your Majesty's Silver Jubilee, and pray that you may long reign over us. The invisible bonds of kinship which bind the people of the Empire as one family in common allegiance to the Crown have been knit closer by the development of wireless, which has progressed during Your Majesty's reign to the extent of enabling your subjects, wherever they may be, to hear Your Majesty's voice. When this telegram, originating in the southern seas on the sixth day of May, 1935, will have reached Your Majesty it will have been transmitted around the Empire and will have been endorsed on behalf of the fellows by a representative of the society in each of the places named hereunder, the messages having been assembled and transmitted from Australia to England by Beam Wireless facsimile. Ever Your Majesty's faithful subjects nineteen thirty-five. The success of the experiment was made possible by the cooperation with the society with the deputy-general manager of A.W.A. (Mr. L. A. Hooke), who supervised the technical arrangements. The telegrams and facsimile transmission were sent by courtesy of Amalgamated Wireless (Australasia), Ltd., and Cable and Wireless, Ltd.

On 2 July 1937, the Nauru coastal radio station VKT was the second last station to hear aviator Amelia Earhart and aviation navigator Fred Noonan on their final attempt to cross the Pacific, before the plane disappeared in the vicinity of Howland Island:

Their one year old plane was a modified version of the new Lockheed Electra 10E. The shiny body was formed from a new aluminum alloy, the two wings were painted a strong red, and the identification number NR16020 was screened in bold black lettering under the left wing, on top of the right wing, and also upon the tail. This trustworthy plane had been almost completely readied for the long haul flight on Thursday, and now on Friday morning the two aviators attended to the final last minute preparations. The two major items of radio equipment aboard the Electra were a standard 12 volt aircraft transmitter and a separate receiver, both manufactured by Western Electric. The three channel transmitter, model number WE13C, was rated at 50 watts, and it was factory adjusted for use on 500 kHz, 3105 kHz and 6210 kHz, for communication in both voice and Morse Code. The official American callsign was KHAQQ. The aircraft receiver, model WE20B, was a regular 4 band aircraft receiver, for reception on longwave, mediumwave, tropical shortwave and international shortwave. The main antenna was a V doublet on top of the plane, with stubby masts above the fuselage and on top of the twin tails. Another main antenna was a long trailing wire underneath the plane that needed to be unrolled and deployed when in use. However, it appears that this antenna had been removed before their departure from Lae, either accidentally or intentionally. . . . At 10:30 GMT during the dark hours of the Pacific night, that is 10-1/2 hours out from Lae, Amelia radioed that she saw the lights of a ship, which happened to be the Myrtlebank, en route from Auckland New Zealand to the isolated island of Nauru. Communication station VKT on Nauru heard the call and responded, but apparently Amelia never heard this confirmation call.

The Daily Commercial News and Shipping List (Sydney) in a prophetic call for development of a Nauru emergency evacuation plan, made disparaging reference to the current state of the wireless station (noting that the plan sought only to address the European community on the island):

NAURU. Nauru Island is a mandated territory, the mandate of which is divided between Great Britain, Australia and New Zealand. Since the mandate went into effect it has practically been controlled by the Australian Government, neither of the other mandatory parties interfering. Replying to a question in the House of Representatives yesterday, a question placed by the Deputy Leader of the Opposition, Mr. Forde, the Prime Minister stated that plans were being formulated to protect the inhabitants of the island of Nauru, in the event of an emergency. It can well be understood that this small community would be in serious danger of being cut off, captured, bombarded, bombed or other incidents of war, with little hope of relief at that distance and with only a very imperfect wireless station on the island, kept going only by the careful nursing of the wireless operator attached to it. Plans, therefore, for the evacuation, any how of the women and children, from the island should be a matter of some consideration to the higher authorities responsible for the mandate.

== World War II ==
On 8 December 1940, the Nauruan wireless station kept Australian authorities informed of the shelling of a merchant ship with visual reports from the island:

SHELLING SEEN FROM SHORE. Mr. Hughes summarised the reports as follows:— "On Sunday morning last a vessel was sighted on fire shortly after daylight. She was a few miles off shore, awaiting favourable weather to proceed into port to load. Visibility was bad at the time, and shortly after she was seen the vessel was obscured from the shore. In spite of a careful watch being kept, nothing further was seen until the afternoon, when the weather cleared, and a ship was seen to be on fire some distance from the land. Another vessel was in her vicinity, and was apparently firing on her. Both vessels disappeared from view shortly afterwards. A number of other vessels was known to be in the vicinity of the island the unfavourable weather having caused an unusual concentration of shipping awaiting an opportunity to proceed to loading berths. On receipt of the reports from Nauru, all shipping in the area was instructed to disperse and make for other ports." NO REPORTS FROM OTHER SHIPS "Since the incidents seen from Nauru on Sunday, no further ships have been sighted from the island, which has been in continuous wireless communication with the mainland. This, however, was to be expected in view of the instructions to shipping to give the island a wide berth. The fact that nothing has been heard from the ships concerned is not necessarily of significance, as they would not use their wireless for fear of giving their positions away to any possible enemy. Information is likely to be received from them when they reach another port. Such information is now awaited."

Within a week of the reported shelling it was confirmed that all 5 merchant vessels that had been in the immediate vicinity of the island of Nauru at the time of the shelling, were lost, either sunk or captured.

The wireless station played a role (if passive one) in the first German attack on Nauru:

HOW RAIDER ATTACKED NAURU. Made Signal, "Do Not Use Wireless" SYDNEY, December 28.— In a statement this afternoon Mr. Hughes said, "Later reports from Nauru describing the attack on the island on the morning of December 27 state that an enemy raider bearing a Japanese name arrived off the island shortly before daybreak and signalled the island by name with a Morse lamp. "The enemy then signalled Nauru, 'Do not use your wireless or I shall shoot the mast down. I am going to shoot at the phosphate loading jetties in order to save the destruction of human life and property.' "The instruction not to use the wireless was complied with and at 6.40 a.m., Nauru local time, the raider opened fire on the essential potash store and loading gear, the cantilever loading jetty, all the oil storage tanks and cantilever shore storage. "The mooring gear, store and other phosphate buildings were shelled at close range but the mooring buoys were destroyed by pompom fire. The oil fuel tanks were still burning last night. The wireless station, however, remains intact as also does the power station. Private houses were not fired on. "It is now stated by Nauru that the raider hoisted the Nazi flag before opening fire." Mr. Hughes added that this confirmed the suspicion that the raider got within safe range and ascertained that no warships were in the vicinity before revealing its identity.

In April 1941, following the release of a New Zealand report into merchant shipping losses, allegations were made against the Nauran wireless officers, but the charges were greatly moderated shortly thereafter:

HUGHES' SPY CHARGE. From Our Special Representative. CANBERRA, Wednesday. "The suggestion that spies are not at Nauru is one which, in view of all that has come and gone, I cannot entertain," said the Minister for the Navy (Mr. W. M. Hughes) to-day. The Minister's statement was inspired by the report of the Royal Commission which inquired in New Zealand into the sinking of the Holmwood, Rangitane, Komata and the Vinni, and the Commission's criticism of the "inexplicable failure of the Nauru Island authorities to issue a warning." Earlier today Mr. Hughes had said that when the wholesale sinkings of merchant ships occurred off Nauru last December, there were on the island some spies, traitors, or paid agents of Germany or of whatever Power was responsible for the sinkings. This, he said, was the only explanation for the failure of the Nauru Island authorities to give warning of the approach of a ship using the Japanese flag as a disguise. "We have made inquiries, and that is the only explanation," he declared. Later this afternoon Mr. Hughes made the following statement:— "Sound And Loyal" "The inquiry which I mentioned this morning was made by an officer of the Navy Department who was sent to Nauru for the purpose. He interrogated various people concerned. "The result was that he could discover nothing to suggest that anything was wrong with the wireless people at Nauru. "But it was conceivable, according to the report, that a leakage of information arose out of messages sent by Bentley's code on behalf of the Phosphate Commission. This would be enough to indicate what shipping movements were going on. "Then, again, the issue of meteorological reports to the effect that westerly winds were blowing would indicate that ships were lying off the island. "Our inquiries go to show that the personnel of the wireless station was competent, sound and loyal. "Message Delayed" "Further, as to whether the people were negligent in not keeping watch for signals, the report of the Triadic's distress signal was actually heard at Ocean island. The operator on watch at the time seems to have been incompetent, since he took no steps to broadcast this message immediately. "It was not until an hour later that he attempted to pass on a garbled version of the message to Suva radio. This is confirmed by the New Zealand officer who investigated the matter." Mr. Hughes said he thought it right to supplement this report by repeating what the captain of the Rangitane had said to him during his recent visit to Australia. When the captain on the raider intimated to the captain of the Rangitane that he was going to Nauru again, the captain of the Rangitane expressed the opinion that the cruisers would have been warned, and that the raider would be running into trouble. The captain of the raider said, "Oh, that is all right. Everything has been fixed." "The captain of the Rangitane took that to mean that effective warnings of the former visit of the raider had not been broadcast," Mr. Hughes said. "Greatly Impressed" "I know nothing of the thing myself, but I was greatly impressed with what the captain of the Rangitane said. "He was a man of excellent reputation in command of a ship of 17,000 tons, and I could not but believe that he was repeating what he had heard the captain of the raider say." Asked how this information affected his statement made earlier today in which he referred to spies, traitors and paid agents at Nauru, Mr. Hughes said: "I expressed my opinion. It would appear that the suspicions I entertained in regard to the negligence or incompetence of the wireless operators at Nauru are not confirmed. I spoke at the time as I felt, but that there has been negligence — although in another quarter, at Ocean Island — has been abundantly proved." "But what about the spies you mentioned?" he was asked. "If you ask me that," said Mr. Hughes, "I will ask you, 'Where is there a country where spies are not to be found working tirelessly in the interests of our great enemy?' " "The suggestion that spies are not at Nauru is one which, in view of all that has come and gone, I cannot entertain."

A few days later the professional Radio Employees' Institute expressed clear support for the reputation of the radio officer of the Nauru coastal radio station:

RADIO MEN FIRM IN LOYALTY Mr. L. A. McPherson, general secretary of the Professional Radio Employees' Institute, writes:— "The governing council of the Professional Radio Employee' Institute of Australasia has considered a Press report of a statement made by the Minister for the Navy (Mr. Hughes) in regard to the sinkings of merchant vessels which occurred off Nauru in December last. It was felt that the reference to the radio staff at Nauru constituted a most unjust attack on a member of this institute, and might well lead the public to suspect the loyalty of professional men engaged in providing services, which in the present emergency are of special importance and involve the strictest confidence and discretion." "At this meeting," Mr. McPherson said, "the following resolution was carried unanimously:— "That this Council views with deep concern and resentment the reported statement of the Minister for the Navy (Mr. W. M. Hughes) that 'spies, traitors or paid agents were either in charge of the Nauru wireless or in a position to influence personnel.' This statement places a member of the Institute under suspicion of treachery, and we consider that, in justice to this man whose loyalty has been impugned, and in justice to other members of the Institute who, on land, sea and in the air, are performing services of great national importance, Mr. Hughes should either withdraw his statement or announce that he has been misquoted, and that no stigma attaches to the officer in charge of Nauru radio station." STAFF EXONERATED "Mr. Hughes has since indicated that the report of the naval officer who conducted an investigation at Nauru completely exonerated the radio station staff. He did little, however, to make amends for the injury to the reputation of a thoroughly trustworthy officer. "I shall be pleased if you will publish this letter for the information of those members of the public who have been misled by the earlier report."

The Japanese attack on Pearl Harbor and Hawaii of 8 December 1941, that immediately brought the United States into WW2, is well known. But in the hours immediately following there were numerous other attacks across the Pacific and south-east Asia. Nauru itself was bombed at this time. On 9 December 1941, the New Zealand Government reported that Nauru had been bombed for a second time. On 10 December 1941, Nauru was bombed for a third time by a single aircraft, according to a BBC report. A fourth bombing raid was reported summarily with a prophetic reference to possibility of Japanese occupation:

FOUR AIR ATTACKS ON NAURU. Four separate raids have been made on Nauru Island by Japanese aeroplanes, according to official advices received in Melbourne. These may be based in the mandated Caroline Islands about 300 miles distant. First raid was made on Monday when one of the attackers was reported to be a 4-engined bomber. The second was made by one plane, the third by 2, and the fourth on Thursday by 3 planes. Extent of the damage has not been disclosed and no loss of life has been reported. Because of the repeated attacks it is feared that an effort may be made by Japanese to take possession of the island although no information has been received of any attempt to make a landing.

All the newspaper reports of the day were silent as to the target of the bombing raids, but it later became clear that the focus had been on the wireless station itself and that the station had been destroyed:

Japanese forces launched simultaneous attacks against US, Australian, British and Dutch forces, on 8 December 1941 (7 December in the Western Hemisphere). That same day, a Japanese surveillance aircraft was sighted above Nauru. The first attack took place on 9 December; three planes flying from the w:Marshall Islands bombed the wireless station at Nauru, but failed to cause any damage. The Nauruans, warned by observers on Ocean Island 350 kilometres (189 nmi; 217 mi) to the east, managed to seek shelter before the attack. The following day, another plane made a second attempt on the radio station. The third day, four planes made a low-altitude strike and finally destroyed it. During these three days, 51 bombs were dropped on or close to the station. The governor of the island, Lieutenant-Colonel Frederick Chalmers, sent a message to w:Canberra stating that he thought the Japanese had not destroyed phosphate production facilities because they intended to occupy the island for its resources. All maritime contact with the rest of the world was interrupted.

It is interesting to note that there do not appear to have been any contemporaneous Australian newspaper reports of the occupation on Nauru by Japanese forces:

Operation RY was the name given by the Japanese to their plan to invade and occupy Nauru and Ocean Island. The operation was originally set to be executed in May 1942, immediately following Operation MO (the invasion of New Guinea and the Solomon Islands), and before Operation MI (the attack on Midway).

The first attempt to occupy Nauru began on 11 May, when an Imperial Japanese invasion force consisting of a cruiser, two mine-layers and two destroyers, with Special Naval Landing Force units, under the command of Rear Admiral Shima Kiyohide, departed Rabaul. The task force was attacked by the United States Navy submarine S-42, leading to the loss of the minelayer Okinoshima. Attempts by the rest of the task force to continue with the operation were called off after Japanese reconnaissance aircraft sighted the American aircraft carriers USS Enterprise and Hornet heading towards Nauru.

A second invasion force departed Truk on 26 August, and three days later, a company of the 43rd Guard Force (Palau) conducted an unopposed landing on Nauru and assumed occupation duties. They were joined by the 5th Special Base Force company, which departed Makin on September 15 and arrived at Nauru two days later. By October 1942, there were 11 officers and 249 enlisted Japanese soldiers on Nauru. On 7 March 1943, Captain Takenao Takenouchi arrived to take command of the garrison (known as 67 Naval Guard Force); he, however, was ill and bed-ridden throughout his tenure, and command was effectively held by Lt. Hiromi Nakayama, who had led the initial landing force. On 13 July, Captain Hisayuki Soeda arrived to replace Takenouchi as commander of 67 Naval Guard Force, a position he held until the end of the war.

The re-establishment of wireless communication facilities would have been a major focus of the occupying force, particularly in view of the ultimate size of the contingent.

== Postmaster-General's Department, Australia (2) ==
Immediately following the surrender of the Japanese forces on Nauru on 15 September 1945, Australia re-established civil administration and a radio station (likely a temporary facility) was placed into service. In a brief statement, in The Argus (Melbourne) of 23 November 1945, the essential resumption of a wireless telegraphy service to Nauru was announced, noting that messages will be accepted at the Beam Wireless office or at any telegraph office. In August 1946, communication between Australia and Nauru was again extended with the provision of a radio-telephone service which was being run in conjunction with Amalgamated Wireless (Australasia), Limited.

== Independence ==
It is likely that the radio-telephony facilities on the island, from at least the 1950s, were also used to broadcast news and information to residents of the island when the station was not required for commercial traffic. A low power AM radio broadcasting station is stated to have been established at Nauru at the time of independence in 1968; however, it is believed that the station had been in operation for several years prior to that. Frequency allocated was 1320 kHz, but this was changed in 1978 to 1323 kHz to accord with the 1975 Geneva Plan with 9 kHz spacing. In more recent years the AM radio operation has been closed down and operation now continues only on the FM radio band.

On 2 April 2007, a new FM radio service "Radio Pasifik Nauru, Triple 9 FM" was established at Nauru, it was funded by a grant from the Fiji-based University of the South Pacific. It is a sister station to USP's main student and community radio station, Radio Pasifik, Triple 8 FM, located at the Laucala Campus in Suva, Fiji. Linda Austin, Media Resource Coordinator at the USP Media Centre and Alamanda Lauti, USP campus director in Nauru initiated the project. The proposed radio station initially broadcast recorded lectures and tutorials in courses with high enrolment. The station used a 30-watt FM "radio in a suitcase" designed by the Commonwealth of Learning and Wantok Enterprises of Canada. The radio station uses a solar power system with capacity for 6 hours daily. The programmes at the commencement of service of the station were to include speeches from government and civil dignitaries and those relating to matters of particular local importance. But these had to be postponed when a Tsunami warning was received in relation to the earthquake and tsunami in the Solomon Islands. Radio Pasifik Nauru immediately switched into emergency mode and commenced to broadcast weather information and advice to locals on Tsunami protection.
