= Scouting and Guiding in Nauru =

Nauru Scouting and Guiding Organization

Nauru Scouts emblem with elements of the flag of Nauru

Scouts and Guides have existed in Nauru at various times since around 1930.

Nauru Girl Guides emblem

== History ==
Scouting and Guiding was introduced to Nauru around 1930. In the 1930s, the Scouting movement relied on older islanders as teachers of traditional bushcraft, serving as a tool of cultural preservation. The uniform at the time consisted of a lavalava with a Scout badge and belt. In December 1937, more than one eighth of the island's population were Scouts (over 200 of a population of 1600). There was a Nauru branch of Girl Guides Australia in the 1960s, though the distance between Australia and places like Nauru was noted to be an issue for communication and administration. In 1962, there were 89 enrolled Girl Guides in Nauru.

In 1982, Nauru issued a miniature sheet of stamps commemorating the Year of the Scout and the 75th anniversary of the Scouting movement.

== Relationship with Geelong Scouts ==
Scouts in Nauru have been linked to Scout leaders in Geelong, Victoria dating back to the 1930s.Nauruan Scouts and Geelong Scouts camped next to each other at the 1934 Jamboree at Frankston. Harold Hurst, the leader of Geelong Scouts, was a driving force in establishing ties between the two groups, having provided transportation, accommodation and education for visiting Nauruan Scouts. The Geelong Scouts subsequently collected books to send to Nauru and, by 1936, the Nauru Scouts had approximately 1000 books.

After World War II, Scouts from Geelong made visits to Nauru to reintroduce scouting to the island, and Scouts from Nauru continued to visit Geeolong.

In May 2013, Scouts from Nauru made another visit to the Scouts in Geelong.
