= Greta Harris =

Nauruan politician

Greta Harris is an administrator and politician from the Pacific Republic of Nauru.

== Professional background ==
Harris has served as Director of Development Policy at the Republic of Nauru's Department of Finance and Economic Planning.

In 2006 she was a co-author of the Republic of Nauru's National Sustainable Development Strategies: National Assessment Report.

== 2010 elections to the Parliament of Nauru ==
In 2010 Ms. Harris entered politics when she announced that she would be standing for the Parliament of Nauru in the elections called by President of Nauru Marcus Stephen for April 24, 2010.

On April 20 a statement made by Ms. Harris condemning the allegedly obstructive behaviour of the Opposition which had led President Stephen to dissolve Parliament was widely noted.

== See also ==
- Politics of Nauru
