= Deep-sea mining regulations in Nauru =

Explanation of Nauru's triggering of the 2-year rule for deep-sea mining regulation

On 25 June 2021, the president of Nauru, Lionel Aingimea, made a formal request to the president of the International Seabed Authority's (ISA) council to complete the adoption of rules, regulations and procedures necessary to facilitate the approval of plans of work for exploitation of deep-sea resources in the Area. This request is based on the "2-year rule", which is part of a provision from the 1994 Agreement relating to the Implementation of Part XI of the United Nations Convention on the Law of the Sea. The provision can be found in section 1 of the annex, and it states that the ISA must complete the adoption of rules, regulations and procedures for the approval of the exploitation of deep-sea minerals within 2 years of the request. The ISA's current deadline for drafting new regulation is set in July 2023, although some claim that this is not a "hard" or "fixed" deadline. Due to the issue's complexity, negotiations have thus far failed to come to a concrete agreement. Even if it fails to set clear standards for deep-sea mining activities, the ISA must consider applications for exploitation in waters outside national jurisdictions and provisionally approve contracts after July 2023. Many experts fear that deep-sea mining activities that are not adequately regulated could significantly impact the marine environment, the economies of many nations and the livelihoods of indigenous groups who depend on the oceans for survival.

== Existing regulation for deep-sea mining activities ==
According to Article 157 of the United Nations Convention on the Law of the Sea (UNCLOS), all mineral-related activities in areas beyond national jurisdictions (referred to as The Area in UNCLOS) are organized and controlled by The International Seabed Authority (ISA), especially the administration of resources. Article 136 of UNCLOS states that The Area and its resources are the common heritage of mankind. Article 137 further states that no state can claim sovereignty over the Area and its resources and that the ISA must act on behalf of all mankind when regulating the deep sea. Another essential responsibility of the ISA is adequately protecting the marine environment from potential harmful consequences of deep-sea activities. The ISA also has the authority to approve exploration contracts as long as the goals of these missions are in accordance with the "common heritage of mankind" principle. Over the years, the ISA has approved several of these contracts. Consequently, certain rich states and private stakeholders have lobbied and pushed for contracts and legislation that advantage them to the detriment of poorer states from the global south.

These aspects resulted in the process of legislating deep-sea mining activities becoming a challenging endeavour for the ISA. Over the last few decades, the ISA drafted regulation for exploring and prospecting deep-sea resources. These measures have generally been referred to as Exploration Regulations. On the basis of these regulations, the ISA has granted several exploration contracts to states and private actors. When it comes to the exploitation of the resources found in the seabed, since 2011 the ISA has been unsuccessfully trying to develop a concrete regulatory framework. The authority has prepared a draft of potential rules and regulations, provisionally named Draft Exploitation Regulations, which has yet to be approved in a final form. At the same time, the most recent version was published in 2019. The draft deals primarily with environmental concerns in regard to deep-sea mining and the measures and conditions that aspiring contractors need to fulfil in order to protect the marine ecosystem. The draft further underlines the common heritage of mankind principle and that deep-sea resources be mined in an equitable manner.

The most recent significant event for legislating deep-sea mining activities was the 1st part of the 28th annual session of the International Seabed Authority between the 16th and 31 March 2023 at the ISA's headquarters in Kingston, Jamaica. The meeting was inconclusive in coming up with concrete regulations and failed to adopt the Draft Exploitations Regulations in a final form. This fact puts further pressure on the ISA, as the 2-year rule's deadline is July 2023, and experts fear that the authority will be unable to adopt legislation in time. The 2nd part of the 28th annual session of the ISA will take part between the 10th and 21 July 2023.

== Nauru's justification for triggering the 2-year rule ==
The government of Nauru stated that Nauru has proudly taken a leading role in developing the international legal framework governing seafloor nodules in the international seabed area (the Area). The authorities further stated that the Draft Exploitation Regulations have been in development for a long time, and are ready to be adopted in a final form. The Nauruan government underlined the urgency of adopting concrete regulation for deep-sea mining activities to provide the legal certainty required for the industry to move forward. The government also highlighted the importance that the exploitation of deep-sea resources would have on the country, as Nauru is a tiny nation with few remaining natural resources and which is heavily affected by global warming.

Nauru was once one of the most prosperous nations in the world due to the abundance of phosphate on the island, which was mined continuously for decades. However, the mining of phosphate proved unsustainable, and the process destroyed more than 80% of the island's ecosystem. Furthermore, it had severe adverse effects on the economy because the entire country was dependent on phosphate mining, and once it ran out, Nauru lost its primary source of income, and the country entered a period of major decline in all aspects. Therefore, the nation is looking for new ways of generating income, and per the declarations of the Nauruan government, deep-sea mining is one of the main alternatives.

According to the government, one of the most significant factors for Nauru's triggering of the 2-year rule is the fact that Nauru Ocean Resources Inc (NORI), a Nauruan entity sponsored by Nauru, intends to apply for approval of a plan of work for exploitation. NORI, which obtained an exploration contract more than a decade ago, has also developed an exploitation plan, which the Nauruan authorities claim will benefit all the stakeholders involved, and that the project is following the heritage of mankind principle. The government further emphasized that the decision to activate the 2-year rule belonged solely to the state of Nauru and that NORI was not directly involved in the decision.

== Controversies ==
Nauru's decision to trigger the 2-year rule has created a wave of negative reactions and critiques from different organizations, countries and researchers. These reactions are related to the potential adverse effects of deep-sea mining activities on the marine environment, claims that wealthier countries would have an advantage to developing nations' detriment, and the private sector's alleged interference in Nauru's decision.

=== Environmental concerns ===
As a reaction to the pressure placed on the ISA to produce legislation for deep-sea mining activities and to hand out exploitation contracts, several NGOs, countries, private organisations and scientists have called for a complete moratorium on deep-sea mining activities due to concerns over the adverse effects they would have on the marine environment and ecosystems. The World Wildlife Fund (WWF) is one of the leading organisations calling for a global moratorium on deep-sea mining activities. On their website, the WWF claims that the ISA is not doing their job in protecting the marine environment and that allowing any mining in the seabed would cause irreversible damage to the environment. The Deepsea Conservation Coalition, an organisation of over 100 non-government organizations, fishers organizations and law and policy institutes worldwide, has also called for a moratorium on deep-sea mining activities, stating that these activities would irreversibly destroy ancient deep-sea habitats. The International Union for Conservation of Nature (IUCN), a membership Union of government and civil society organisations, which works to advance sustainable development across the globe, overwhelmingly voted in support of a moratorium on deep seabed mining to protect life in the ocean and sent an open letter to the ISA. Several countries' governments have also come out against deep-sea mining activities. For example, the German Federal Ministry for the Environment, Nature Conservation Nuclear Safety and Consumer Protection issued a statement in which it declared that Germany will not sponsor deep-sea mining until further notice and that it is urging other member states of the ISA to follow suit and stop supporting applications as well. Some major private companies, such as BMW, Volvo, Google and Samsung, are also in favour of a global moratorium.

The potentially harmful effects of deep-sea mining activities on the marine environment is a topic often discussed in scientific journals and publications. Several studies highlight the essential interconnectedness between the seabed and the water column above, and concluded that deep-sea mining activities would lead to the rise of sediments from the seabed into the water, severely damaging the ecosystem and endangering vulnerable species. A number of researchers have also called for a better understanding of the seabed, stating that our current knowledge is flawed, as the seabed is often seen as a dead and flat surface waiting to be exploited. These researchers claim that the seabed should be viewed as a dynamic place full of life and connected to the water column above and that without a better understanding which would be reflected in the legislation, deep-sea mining should not go ahead.

=== Accusations of inequity ===
The ISA's African group, formed of 47 African nations, criticised Nauru's decision to trigger the 2-year rule in a letter sent to the ISA's Council. The group argues that awarding exploitation contracts for deep-sea resources in the Area would severely negatively impact the economies of several African states whose economies are highly dependent on mining. At the same time, developed nations and private companies would be the main benefactors. The group further criticized the legislation's current payment regime, which would see that profits from deep-sea mining activities would be equally shared between member states. The African group's critiques focus on the fact that the current legislation does not take into account the environmental costs of deep-sea mining, which would affect developing nations from the global south the most, further highlighting that the legislation would not result in mankind benefiting as a whole from deep-sea mining.

Several researchers have also underlined the importance that the oceans and the seabed have for indigenous communities around the globe, who are heavily dependent on them, and the damage from deep-sea mining activities would severely impact their livelihoods. Furthermore, for many communities who live in proximity to the oceans, the water and the seabed also have cultural and spiritual significance, and disturbing them is seen as taboo. According to these researchers, the existing, as well as the proposed legislation, fail to take into account the needs of these communities and the adverse consequences that deep-sea mining would have on their existence.

=== Involvement from the private sector ===
The Nauruan authorities stated that Nauru Ocean Resources Inc's intent to apply for approval of a plan of work for exploitation is one of their reasons for triggering the 2-year rule, yet claimed that NORI was not directly involved in the decision. Despite this, several authors and stakeholders have accused Nauru of acting as a client state or proxy for NORI, a subsidiary of the Canadian firm The Metals Company (TMC), one of the biggest private companies interested in undertaking deep-sea mining contracts. In 2019, the chairman of TMC, then known as DeepGreen, was a member of the Nauruan delegation at the ISA and spoke for the country in the plenary meetings. This fact further raised suspicions about the relationship between the company and Nauru.

The Metals Company claims that mining the sea bed for resources is vital for humanity's sustainable development, as the resources can be used for making wind turbines and batteries for electric vehicles. The company also underlined its commitment to the environment and made assurances that their activities would not cause severe damage to marine ecosystems. At the beginning of 2023, a video surfaced on the internet, which showed one of The Metals Company's vessels pouring black discharge into the ocean, once again raising concerns regarding TMC's commitment to protecting the environment.
