= Visa policy of Nauru =

Policy on permits required to enter Nauru

Visitors to Nauru must obtain a visa unless they are citizens from one of the visa-exempt countries.

All visitors must hold a passport valid for at least 3 months. Transit visas are not required if the connecting flight leaves within three hours of arrival in Nauru. Business visitors must have a local sponsor.

Visa applications are made by emailing the Nauru Immigration with necessary details.

== Visa policy map ==
Visa policy of Nauru Nauru Visa not required (90 days) Visa not required (14 days) Visa required

== Visa exemption ==
=== Ordinary passports ===
==== IATA ====
According to the information from IATA, citizens of the following countries may enter Nauru without a visa for a maximum of 90 days:

- Russia
- Spain
- United Arab Emirates

==== Bilateral agreements ====
Citizens of the following countries may enter Nauru without a visa for the following period in accordance with bilateral agreements:

90 days

- United Arab Emirates

90 days within any 6 months

- Israel

14 days

- Russia

Date of visa changes
- 28 September 2010: Israel
- 14 May 2015: Russia
- 19 November 2017: United Arab Emirates

=== Non-ordinary passports ===
Holders of diplomatic passports of Spain and holders of diplomatic and official passports of India and Japan may enter Nauru without a visa.

== Visa required in advance ==
=== Visa fee exemption ===
According to the Nauru National Tourism Corporation, citizens of the following countries and territories are exempt from paying the visa fee. They must apply for a visitor's visa before travelling. Governments of Ireland and the United States have also confirmed that there is no visa issuance on arrival.

- China
- Cook Islands
- Fiji
- Israel
- Kiribati
- Marshall Islands
- Micronesia
- Niue
- Palau
- Papua New Guinea
- Samoa
- Solomon Islands
- Thailand
- Tonga
- Tuvalu
- Vanuatu

=== Journalist visas ===
In early 2014, it was decided that journalists reporting on Nauru detention centre will be charged 8000 AUD for a 3-month visa.

== Discrepancies ==
- Israel - Citizens of Israel are not listed as a visa-exempt country in the IATA, while according to the bilateral agreement between Israel and Nauru, Israeli citizens do not require a visa. Also the Ministry of Foreign Affairs of Israel has confirmed that Israeli citizens do not require a visa.
- Spain - Citizens of Spain are listed as a visa-exempt country in the IATA and by the Nauru Tourism authority; however, the Ministry of Foreign Affairs of Spain has confirmed that Spanish citizens do require a visa, and according to the Naurua embassy in Brisbane, Spanish citizens are only exempt from visa fee.

== See also ==
- Visa requirements for Nauruan citizens
