= Nauru–Russia relations =

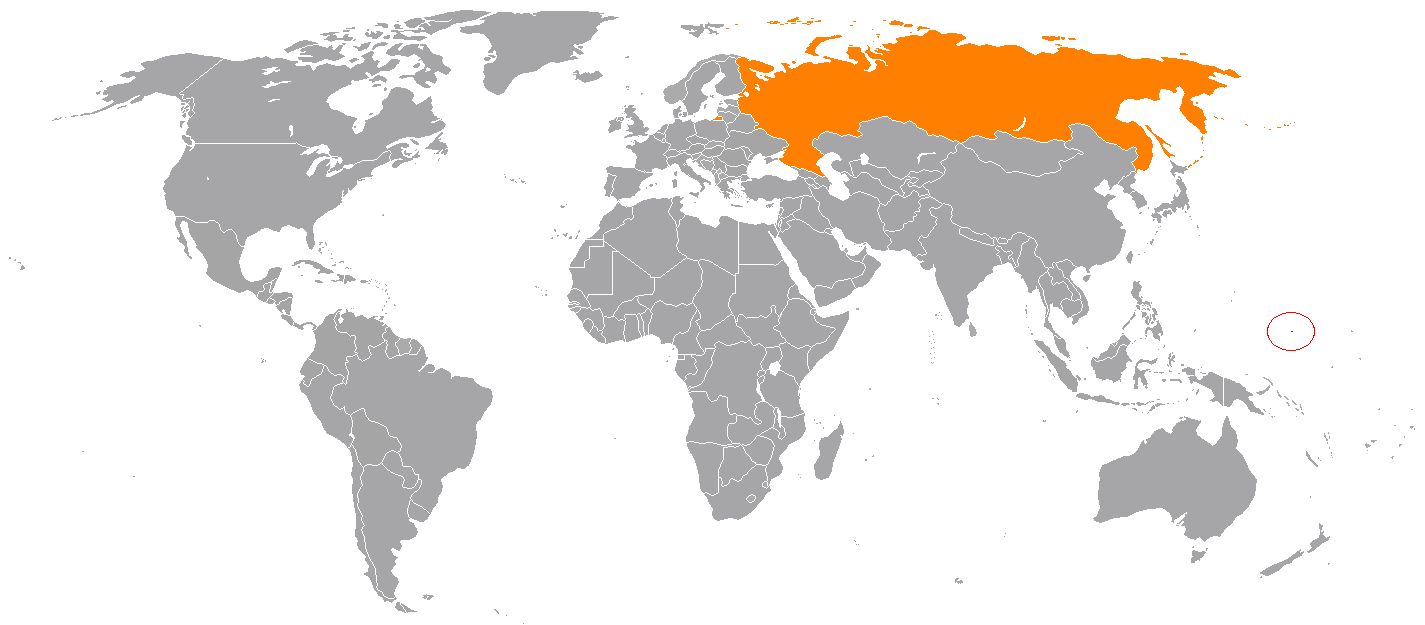

- Nauru: Russia

Nauru–Russia relations are the bilateral relations between Nauru and Russia. Russia is represented in Nauru through its embassy in Canberra (Australia).

== Russian financing ==
The Russian mafia used Nauru banks to money launder during the 1990s; approximately US$70 billion owned by entities of the Russian mafia were held in Nauru banks. This equated to 700 times the country's annual output. The money was transferred from Russian banks to accounts of banks chartered in Nauru, primarily to evade taxes as an offshore tax haven.

=== International reaction ===
Nauru's role in Russian money laundering has attracted attention from around the world particularly after the September 11 attacks in 2001, when concern increased over the financing of terrorism. The Washington Post reported that: "International authorities say Nauru is increasingly providing cover for Russian organized crime" and quoted a senior US Government official:

The central bank of Russia has come to us and confirmed that large amounts of Russian capital are flowing into and out of Nauru, and that has raised concerns on their part and on ours and certainly raised suspicions.

In 2000, the President of Nauru, René Harris, responded to claims of illegal money movements by saying "Nauru does not tolerate criminal activities in its financial system".

== Nauru's recognition of Abkhazia and South Ossetia ==
In 2009, Nauru became only the fourth country to recognize the breakaway regions of Georgia, the republics of Abkhazia and South Ossetia. Russia was reported to be giving Nauru $50m in humanitarian aid in return. Nauru's bilateral relations with Moscow have become even stronger after Nauru has recognized Abkhazia on December 15, 2009, and South Ossetia the next day. Nauru's foreign minister Kieren Keke stated: "I hope that other countries will follow our example and also recognize the independence of Abkhazia". The issue was dealt with in the winter session of the parliament.

Russian officials visited Nauru in March 2010 to discuss the allocation of the "huge aid grant" that Russia will be providing to the small country.

== See also ==
- Foreign relations of Nauru
- Foreign relations of Russia
