= Chitra Jeremiah =

Nauruan diplomat (born 1971)

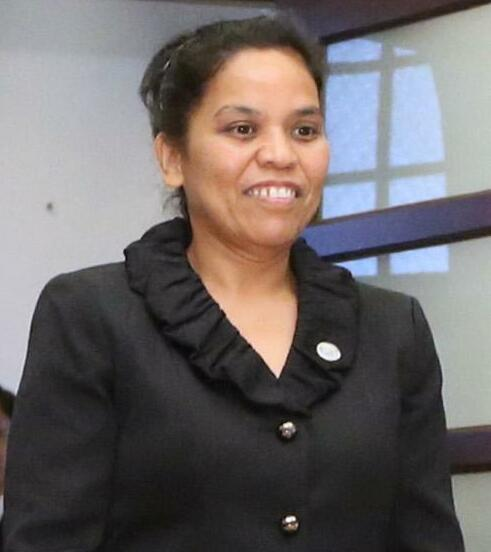
- Jeremiah in 2016

Ambassador of Nauru to China
- Incumbent
- Assumed office 2024

Permanent Representative of Nauru to the United Nations in Geneva
- In office 2023–2024
- In office 2019–2021

Ambassador of Nauru to Taiwan
- In office 2016–2019
- Preceded by: Ludwig Keke
- Succeeded by: Jarden Kephas

Personal details
- Born: 15 June 1971 (age 55) Nauru
- Spouse: Lynden Jeremiah (m. 1995)
- Education: University of South Pacific; Monash University

Chitra Talatoka Jeremiah (née Menke; born 15 June 1971) is a Nauruan diplomat. As of 2024, she is the ambassador of Nauru to the People's Republic of China.

== Early life and education ==
Jeremiah, birth name Chitra Talatoka Lusiana Obeira Menke, was born on 15 June 1971, registered to the Denigomodu District. She is a member of the Deiboe tribe. Later, she would be registered with the Anibare District. From 1990 to 1993, Jeremiah studied at the University of the South Pacific, where she earned a Bachelor of Arts in business studies. She then attended Monash University from 1995 to 1996, where she earned a graduate diploma in foreign affairs and trade with a focus on international affairs. She married Lynden Jeremiah of the Meneng District on 23 September 1995.

== Career ==
Jeremiah served as director of the Department of Foreign Affairs and Trade of Nauru from 1995 to 2001. In September 2004, Jeremiah was appointed as the Pacific Islands Forum's representative on Nauru. She served as Nauru's director of the Aid Management Unit at the Ministry of Finance from 2004 to 2009. In 2009, she was made vice consul at Brisbane, Australia. From 2010 to 2016, she was consul general.

On 27 July 2016, Jeremiah presented her credentials to President Tsai Ing-wen as ambassador from Nauru to Taiwan. She served in this position until 2019. That year, she became Permanent Representative of Nauru to the United Nations Office at Geneva. She served until 2021, when she became Nauru's Secretary of the Ministry of Foreign Affairs. She became Permanent Representative of Nauru to the United Nations Office at Geneva again in 2023, presenting her credentials to Director-General Tatiana Valovaya 14 March. On 17 October 2023, in addition to her UN post, she became the first Nauruan ambassador to Switzerland when she presented her credentials to President Alain Berset.

Following Nauru switching its recognition of Taiwan to the People's Republic of China, Jeremiah became the first Nauruan ambassador to China. Jeremiah presented her credentials to Hong Lei on 11 September 2024. Jeremiah, along with several other ambassadors, had her credentials accepted by President Xi Jinping on 12 December.
