= Operation Weasel =

Alleged secret operation

Operation Weasel is the name given to an alleged secret operation involving the governments of Nauru, New Zealand and the United States. The exact nature of the operation, if it did indeed exist, is subject to disagreement — most accounts link it to investigations into the sale of Nauruan passports, the defection of North Korean scientists to the West, or both. This was a classic example of what is known as a canary trap - a spy tactic of feeding sufficiently important intelligence (traceable but false) to suspects to find leaks.

The first public mentions of Operation Weasel were made in March 2003, when The Australian printed a story claiming that the Nauruan embassy in Beijing was a front by which North Korean defectors could be assisted in escaping to the West. According to the report, Nauru had been approached by individuals claiming to represent the governments of New Zealand and the United States, who wished to smuggle North Korean defectors through the embassies of a third, neutral party. According to the paper, Nauru would receive cash compensation for participating, and the Nauruan embassy in Beijing would be paid for and staffed by New Zealand and United States personnel. New Zealand and United States officials were reported as denying the story.

The embassy, when it was established, was run by chargé d'affaires Jack Sanders, a New Zealander. (The Herald also said that Sanders was wanted by police, although this has been labelled a smear campaign following an investigation by Scoop reporter Selwyn Manning. He later came to public attention as a source for a controversial news story about the New Zealand Security Intelligence Service, which was later retracted). According to the original reports in The Australian, at least twenty defectors were successfully smuggled out.

Nauru's embassies in Beijing and Washington were closed in August 2003, with the Nauruan government having been sent documents claiming that they were selling diplomatic passports. President Ludwig Scotty stated at the time that staff were "not serving their intended purpose". Trans-Pacific Development Corporation was involved in the sale of Nauruan passports, allowing passports to fall into the hands of terrorists — according to their claims, Operation Weasel was originally a project by various agencies in New Zealand and the United States (including the US Central Intelligence Agency) to stop these activities, and only later became a front for North Korean defections.
