= India–Nauru relations =

India–Nauru bilateral relations in the Commonwealth

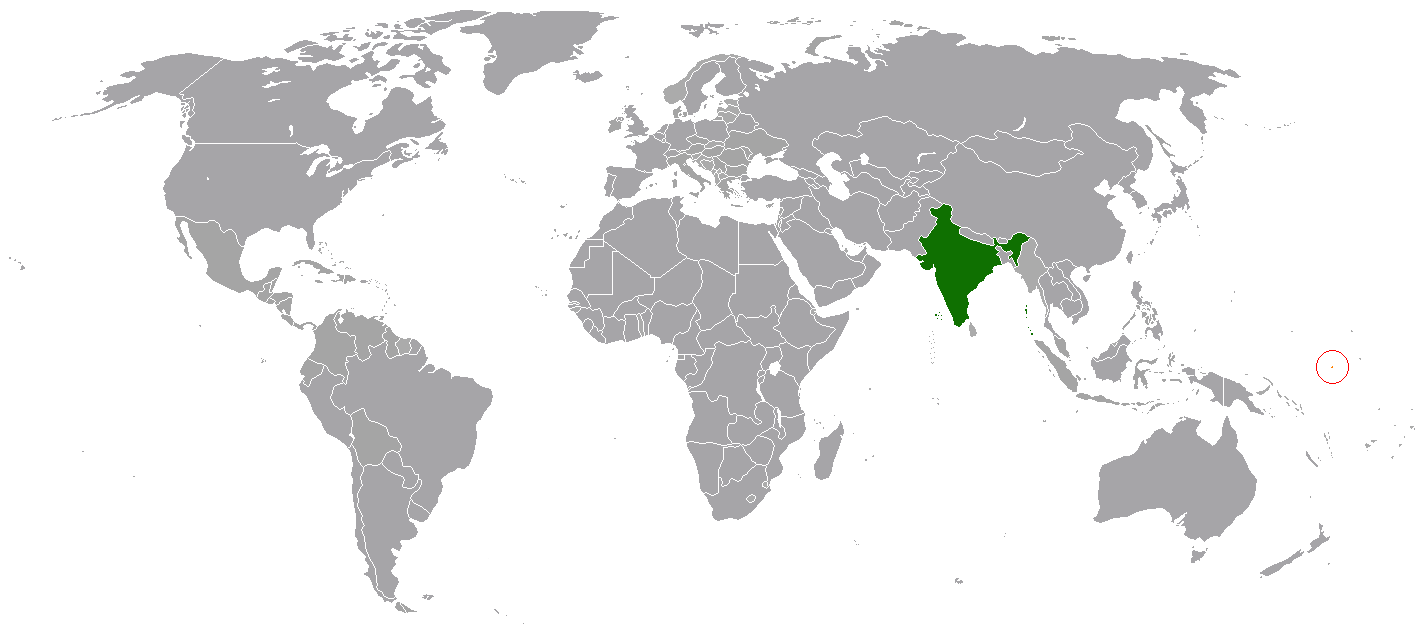

- India: Nauru

India–Nauru relations are the international relations that exist between India and Nauru. These have been established since the island's independence in 1968.

Both India and Nauru are republics in the Commonwealth of Nations.

== History ==
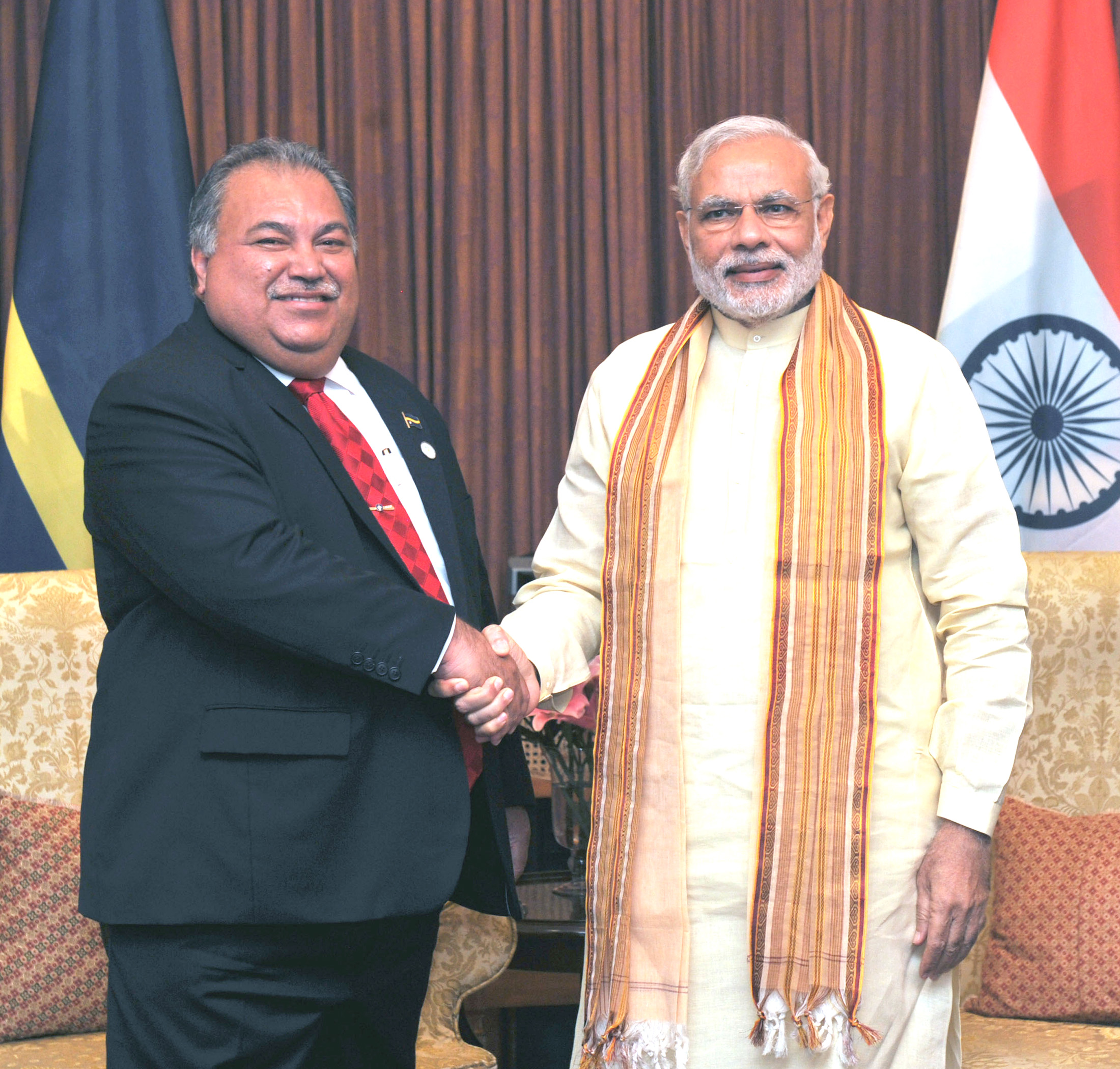
Nauruan President Baron Waqa and Indian Prime Minister Shri Narendra Modi in India.

Nauru had invested in Paradeep Phosphates Ltd (incorporated in 1981) a joint venture between the Governments of India and Nauru. Former President Bernard Dowiyogo visited India in June 1993, when Nauru dis-invested its shares due to the losses incurred worth A$63.8 million in Paradeep Phosphate Ltd. India bought Nauru's equity for the amount Nauru had initially invested. Former President Kinza Clodumar visited India during April 1998 to attend the First Assembly Meeting of the Global Environment Facility (GEF). The visit was utilized for bilateral exchange of views and President was treated as a state guest for two days after the GEF meeting.

Prime Minister Narendra Modi hosted a 14 nation India-Pacific Island Countries Forum Summit in Suva, Fiji, during a visit to the island nation which included a Nauruan delegation where India had committed to establish a trade office in New Delhi, construction of a pan-pacific telecommunication network, increase grant aid to $200,000 annually for the region and providing on arrival visa for Nauruan citizens.

Minister of State for Defence, Subhash Bhamre, visited Nauru for their 50th anniversary for the constitution day. The government of India also helped the Nauru Police Force with their supply of uniforms for the celebrations and with the supply of 22 SUVs & 2 buses to the country.

== Foreign aid ==
India is one of the largest donors to the island by helping the education ministry to set up transportation facilities for the students and funds for recruiting more teachers for the schools and has improved the infrastructure of the parliament by setting up of transportation and computer connections for the MP's and the speaker.

In November 2003, the Government of Nauru again requested for deputation of a team of experts in the field of computer, mining of phosphate, power generation and desalination plant. President Marcus Stephen visited India in October 2010 for the New Delhi Commonwealth Games where the island won a gold and a silver medal in weightlifting at the Games.

In the job sectors, the government of India allotted 5 slots to Nauru for training courses under the Indian Technical & Economical Cooperation (ITEC) programme in the year 2010–11. One scholarship slot is also offered under General Cultural Scholarship of ICCR (Commonwealth Scheme).

India was admitted as Dialogue Partner of the 33rd Pacific Islands Forum summit as a continued help to Nauru and other Pacific Island nations. The Indian High Commissioner to Fiji is concurrently accredited to Nauru and Nauru has an Honorary Consul General in New Delhi.

In December 2022, MoS of External Affairs RK Ranjan held bilateral meeting where he met President of Nauru Rus Josheph Kun.

== Australia Refugee Crises ==
In 2014, the Australian Government secretly flew out 157 asylum seekers of Tamil descent from the detention center in Canberra to Nauru under a "unique" ideal negotiated by the then Immigration Minister Scott Morrison after they refused to meet with Indian consular officers in Canberra.
