= China–Nauru relations =

- China: Nauru

China–Nauru relations are relations between the People's Republic of China and the Republic of Nauru. The Republic of Nauru and the People's Republic of China established diplomatic relations on 21 July 2002, and resumed on 24 January 2024. Between 2005 and 2024, The government of Nauru recognized the Republic of China, and, in accordance with the "One China" policy, the People's Republic of China did not have diplomatic relations to the country.

== Context ==
Oceania is, to the People's Republic of China and the Republic of China (Taiwan), a stage for continuous diplomatic competition. Eight states in Oceania recognize the PRC, and six recognise the ROC. These numbers fluctuate as Pacific Island nations re-evaluate their foreign policies, and occasionally shift diplomatic recognition between Beijing and Taipei. In keeping with the "One China" policy, it is not possible for any country to maintain official diplomatic relations with "both Chinas", and this "either/or" factor has resulted in the PRC and the ROC actively courting diplomatic favours from small Pacific nations. In 2003, the People's Republic of China announced it intended to enhance its diplomatic ties with the Pacific Islands Forum, and increase the economic aid package it provided to that organisation. At the same time, PRC delegate Zhou Whenzhong added: "The PIF should refrain from any exchanges of an official nature or dialogue partnership of any form with Taiwan". In 2006, Chinese Premier Wen Jiabao announced that the PRC would increase its economic cooperation with Pacific Island States. The PRC would provide more economic aid, abolish tariffs for exports from the Pacific's least developed countries, annul the debt of those countries, distribute free anti-malaria medicines, and provide training for two thousand Pacific Islander government officials and technical staff. Also in 2006, Wen became the first Chinese premier to visit the Pacific islands, which the Taipei Times described as "a longtime diplomatic battleground for China and Taiwan". Similarly, according to Ron Crocombe, Professor of Pacific Studies at the University of the South Pacific, "There have been more Pacific Islands minister visits to China than to any other country".

== History ==
In 1999, China abstained from United Nations Security Council Resolution 1249, which related to Nauru's admission to the United Nations. This was due to Nauru's then-close relationship with Republic of China (Taiwan). However, China still chose to not use its veto, as it believed Nauru's admission was to the benefit of both countries.

On 21 July 2002, then President Rene Harris of Nauru signed a joint communiqué in Hong Kong to establish diplomatic relations with the People's Republic of China. In the document, the Government of the Republic of Nauru recognised that "there is but one China in the world, that the Government of the People's Republic of China is the sole legal government representing the whole of China and that Taiwan is an inalienable part of Chinese territory." The declaration also contained an undertaking by Nauru to close its embassy in Taipei within one month, despite the fact Nauru had never had a diplomatic mission in Taiwan. This move followed the PRC's promise to provide more than $130 million USD in aid.

That same day, the Republic of China (ROC) government issued an ultimatum, demanding that the communiqué be withdrawn within 24 hours or it would take the initiative and sever ties. In the confusion, the Nauruan government did not respond to the ultimatum, which was extended an additional 24 hours, and the ROC followed through with its threat, breaking ties that had existed since 1980 on 23 July 2002. In 2003, Nauru closed its embassy in Beijing, prompting speculation of an imminent resumption of ties with the ROC, which it did in May 2005.

On 15 January 2024, Nauru severed diplomatic relations with the Republic of China (Taiwan) again, restored diplomatic relations with the People's Republic of China, and recognized "the People's Republic of China as the only legitimate government of China" and "Taiwan as part of the People's Republic of China." This shortly followed the election of Taiwanese President Lai Ching-te, seen by Beijing as a separatist. On 24 January 2024, Nauru re-established diplomatic relations with the PRC.

== See also ==
- Sino-Pacific relations#Nauru
- List of ambassadors of China to Nauru
- Nauru–Taiwan relations
