= Nauru–Taiwan relations =

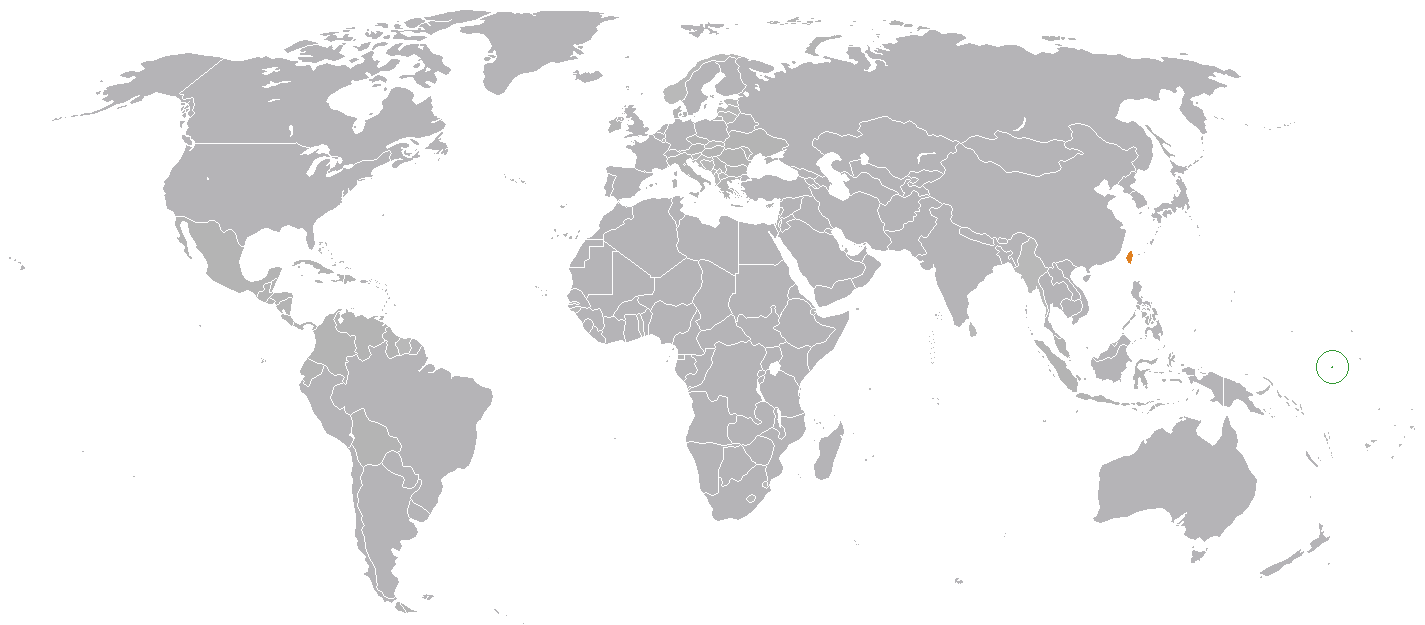

- Nauru: Taiwan

Nauru–Taiwan relations are relations between the Republic of Nauru and the Republic of China (Taiwan). Official diplomatic relations were first established in 1980. Relations were first severed in 2003, when Nauru opted to recognize the People's Republic of China. Formal bilateral relations with Nauru were reestablished in 2005, and maintained until 2024.

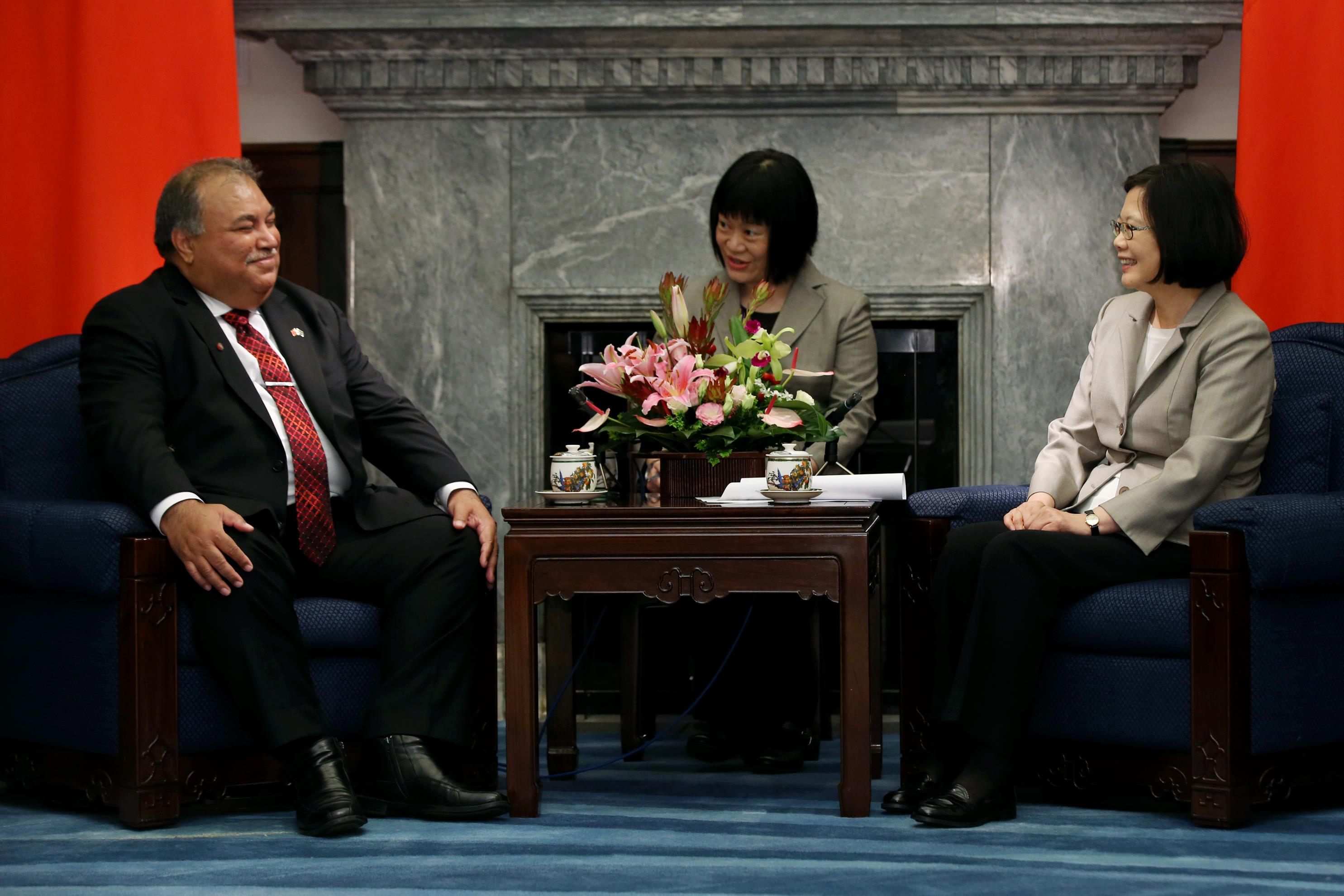
Nauru President Baron Waqa and President Tsai Ing-wen in Taiwan.

== History ==
=== Formal relations, 1980-2002 ===
In 1980, Nauru established official relations with Taiwan. In 2002, however, the government of Rene Harris established relations with the People's Republic of China (PRC), and adopted the One China Policy. Consequently, Taiwan severed its relations with Nauru, and accused the PRC of having bought Nauru's allegiance with financial aid of over €90,000,000.

=== Resumption of diplomatic relations, 2003–2024 ===
In 2003, Nauru closed its newly established embassy in Beijing. Two years later, Taiwanese President Chen Shui-bian met Nauruan President Ludwig Scotty in the Marshall Islands. In May 2005, Taiwan and Nauru re-established diplomatic relations, and opened embassies in each other's capitals. China consequently severed its relations with Nauru.

Taiwan is one of Nauru's two foremost economic aid partners (with Australia). In return, Nauru used its seat in the United Nations to support Taiwan's admittance proposal. Taiwan provides regular medical assistance to Nauru, sending specialised doctors to the country's only hospital.

In 2007, Scotty was re-elected, amidst claims that his electoral campaign had been funded by Taiwan. Opponents likened these foreign funds to bribes, while Scotty claimed the foreign funds were going toward the people. Under Scotty, on 7 March 2007, the first ambassador from Nauru to Taiwan, Ludwig Keke, presented his credentials to President Chen Shui-bian. Scotty was replaced by Marcus Stephen in December 2007. Following Stephen's election, President Chen called to congratulate him, assuring him of Taiwan's continued assistance for Nauru, requesting Nauru's continued support in return, and inviting him to visit Taiwan.

Nauru remains the focus of diplomatic competition between Beijing and Taipei. In 2006, according to the New Statesman, President Scotty "was allegedly accosted by a horde of screaming Chinese officials who tried to drag him on to a plane to Beijing just as he was boarding one bound for Taipei".

In 2011, leaked diplomatic cables revealed that Taiwan had been paying a "monthly stipend" to Nauruan government ministers in exchange for their continued support, as well as a smaller sum to other members of parliament, as "project funding that requires minimal accounting". Reporting on the story, the Brisbane Times wrote: "One MP reportedly used his Taiwanese stipend to buy daily breakfast for all schoolchildren in his district, while others were happy to just pocket the cash". A "former Australian diplomat with close knowledge of politics in Nauru" stated that Nauruan President Marcus Stephen, Foreign Minister Kieren Keke and former President Ludwig Scotty, among others, had all accepted "under the counter" funding from Taiwan. The leaks revealed that "Chinese [PRC] agents had also sought to influence Nauru's elections through cash payments to voters, with at least $40,000 distributed in one instance in 2007".

The cables also revealed that Australia had, at one time, been "pushing" Nauru to break its relations with Taiwan and establish relations with the PRC instead. Then President Scotty had reportedly resisted on the grounds that it was "none of Australia's business".

In late 2011, Taiwan "doubled its health aid" to Nauru, notably providing a resident medical team on a five-year appointment.

In 2018, a diplomatic row between the PRC and Nauru occurred at the Pacific Islands Forum when Nauruans would only stamp entry visas on personal passports of Mainland diplomats rather than diplomatic ones.

=== Severance of diplomatic relations, 2024–present ===
On 15 January 2024, Nauru withdrew its recognition of Taiwan and severed diplomatic relations, restoring diplomatic relations with the People's Republic of China and recognizing "the People's Republic of China as the only legitimate government of China and Taiwan as part of the People's Republic of China". The move came two days after Taiwan had concluded its presidential election, which Nauru had acknowledged with a congratulatory statement. In turn, Taiwan terminated diplomatic relations with Nauru. Taiwan's deputy foreign minister Tien Chung-kwang attributed the end of ties with Nauru to actions by China, which he described as a "despicable act by China" and "an assault on democracy and a challenge to international norms". Party officials of the Democratic Progressive Party and Kuomintang, as well as Taiwan People's Party leader Ko Wen-je, also commented on the decision. Nauru formally reestablished ties with the People's Republic of China on 24 January 2024.

== See also ==
- China–Nauru relations
- Solomon Islands–Taiwan relations
- Australia–Taiwan relations
