= Nauru Island Agreement =

Trusteeship document of Nauru

The Nauru Island Agreement was a joint trusteeship document between the governments of the United Kingdom, Australia, and New Zealand regarding administration of the Pacific island of Nauru. Australia assented to the agreement on 28 October 1919. The act ceased to be in force with the passing of the Statute Law Revision Act 1973.

== Summary ==
Due to the League of Nations mandate placing Australia, the United Kingdom and New Zealand in control of Nauru, it was necessary to construct an agreement on how the island was to be administered.

Under the agreement, Nauru would be run by an administrator, which would be selected by the Australian Government for the first five years, and after that, selected in a way to be later decided. The act also required that a Board of Commissioners was to be formed comprising one member from each nation that was part of the agreement. The Board of Commissioners was given title to the phosphate deposits on the island, and any "land, buildings, plant, and equipment on the island used in connexion with the working of the deposits"; however remuneration was to be given to the previous owners.

The act prohibited the supply of phosphate from Nauru to any country except Australia, New Zealand and the United Kingdom unless the entire Board of Commissioners agreed to the sale.

For the first five years of the administration, provided that the phosphate was intended for agricultural use in the country receiving it, the United Kingdom and Australia would each receive 42% of the phosphate produced, whereas New Zealand would receive 16%. The figures were to be readjusted every five years.
