= Politics of the Federated States of Micronesia =

The politics of the Federated States of Micronesia (FSM) takes place in a framework of a federal assembly-independent representative democratic republic. The President of the Federated States of Micronesia is both head of state and head of government. Executive power is exercised by the president and his cabinet, while legislative power is vested in both the president and the Congress. The judiciary is independent of the executive and the legislature.

The internal workings of the FSM are governed by the 1979 constitution, which guarantees fundamental human rights and establishes a separation of governmental powers. The Federation is in free association with the United States; the Compact of Free Association entered into force 3 November 1986.

== Executive branch ==
Main office holders
Office	Name	Party	Since
President	Wesley Simina	Independent	11 May 2023
Vice President	Aren Palik	Independent	13 September 2022

The president and the vice president are elected by Congress from among the four senators-at-large for four-year terms. The president is both the chief of state and head of government. Their congressional seats are then filled by special elections. The president and vice president are supported by an appointed cabinet.

=== Cabinet ===
The President and Vice President are supported in the administration by a Cabinet made up of 9 appointed officials. They are: the Secretaries of the Department of Environment, Climate Change & Emergency Management (DECEM), the Department of Justice (DOJ), the Department of Foreign Affairs (Foreign Affairs), the Department of Resource & Development (R&D), the Department of Health & Social Affairs (DHSA), the Department of Transportation, Communications, & Infrastructure (TC&I), and the Department of Education (DOE); the heads of the Office of the Public Defender, Office of National Archives, Culture, & Historic Preservations, and FSM Postal Services. Other Cabinet-level officials include the director of the National Oceanic Resource & Maritime Authority, Coconut Development Authority, FSM Banking Board, and National Fisheries Corporation.

Cabinet of Micronesia
Department	Dept. Head's Title	Department Head
Department of Education	Secretary	The Honorable Gardenia Aisek
Department of Finance and Administration	Secretary	The Honorable Rose Nakanaga
Department of Foreign Affairs	Secretary	The Honorable Lorin Robert Deputy Secretary: Ricky Cantero
Department of Health and Social Affairs	Secretary	The Honorable Marcus Samo
Department of Justice	Secretary	The Honorable Leonito Bacalando Jr.
Department of Resource & Development	Secretary	The Honorable Elina Akinaga
Department of Transportation, Communication, and Infrastructure	Secretary	The Honorable Carlson Apis
Department of Environment, Climate Change & Emergency Management	Secretary	The Honorable Andrew Yatilman
Office of Public Defender	Acting Chief Public Defender	Timoci Romanu Esq.
FSM Postal Services	Postmaster General	Ginger Porter Mida
National Archives, Culture and Historic Preservation Office	Director	Dr. Rufino Mauricio
Cabinet-level officials
Coconut Development Authority	General Manager	Peterson Sam
FSM Banking Board		
National Fisheries Corporation	President & CEO	Patricia Jack-Jossien
National Oceanic Resource and Maritime Authority (NORMA)	Executive Director	Eugene Pangelinan

== Legislative branch ==
The Congress has fourteen non-partisan members, ten members elected for a two-year term in single-seat constituencies and four members elected for a four-year term, one from each state at large.

== Judicial branch ==
The judiciary is headed by the Supreme Court of the Federated States of Micronesia, which is divided into trial and appellate divisions. The president appoints judges with the advice and consent of the Congress. Andon Amaraich was Chief Justice of the Federated States of Micronesia until his death in January 2010. He was succeeded by Martin G. Yinug, who served until his death on August 31, 2014. He was succeeded by Dennis K. Yamase, who continues to serve as Chief Justice of the Supreme Court since his investiture on October 2, 2015.

== Political parties and elections ==
A head of state (the President) and a legislature are elected on a national level. At the 2011 election, only non-partisans have been elected. The president is elected for a four-year term by Congress. There are no political parties in Micronesia, though they are not banned. Political allegiances depend mainly on family and island-related factors.

== Government agencies ==
The government of Micronesia includes national agencies to serve the Micronesian people. The FSM Social Security Administration, FSM Telecommunications Corporation, Office of the Public Auditor, and FSM PetroCorp are independent agencies.

Government Agencies
Agency	Dept. Head's Title	Department Head
College of Micronesia-FSM	President	Dr. Joseph Daisy
FSM Development Bank	President & CEO	Anna Mendiola
FSM Social Security Administration	Administrator	Alexander Narruhn
FSM Telecommunications Corporation	General Manager	John Sohl
National Election Commission	Director	Kimeuo Kimuo
Office of the Public Auditor	Public Auditor	Haser Hainrick

== Administrative divisions ==
The FSM is divided in four states: Chuuk (Truk), Kosrae, Pohnpei, and Yap. Each has its own constitution, elected legislature, governor, and lieutenant governor. The state governments maintain considerable power, particularly regarding the implementation of budgetary policies.

Current Governors and Lt. Governors
State	Governor	Lt. Governor
Chuuk State	Alexander Narruhn	Mekeioshy William
Kosrae State	Tulensa Palik	Arthy G. Nena
Pohnpei State	Stevenson A Joseph	Francisco Ioanis
Yap State	Charles Chieng	Francis Itimai

== Foreign affairs and defense ==
The Compact of Free Association with the United States gives the U.S. sole responsibility for international defense of the Marshall Islands. It allows islanders to live and work in the United States, and establishes economic and technical aid programs.

== International organization participation ==
Micronesia is a member of the following international organizations:

- Alliance of Small Island States
- Asian Development Bank
- U.N. Economic and Social Commission for Asia and the Pacific
- Group of 77
- International Civil Aviation Organization
- International Bank for Reconstruction and Development
- International Development Association
- International Finance Corporation
- International Monetary Fund
- Intelsat
- International Olympic Committee
- International Telecommunication Union
- Organization for the Prohibition of Chemical Weapons
- Pacific Islands Forum
- South Pacific Regional Trade and Economic Co-operation Agreement
- Pacific Community (SPC)
- United Nations
- U.N. Conference on Trade and Development
- World Health Organization
- World Meteorological Organization

== See also ==
- List of diplomatic missions in the Federated States of Micronesia
