= List of female finance ministers =

A finance minister is an executive or cabinet position in charge of the financial affairs of a state, which usually includes all matters pertaining to the government budget, economic and fiscal policy, and financial regulation. There have been many women appointed to that post around the world. This list comprises female finance ministers from around the world, either from sovereign states, limited recognized states, federated states, autonomous regions, or sui generis entities. The finance minister's portfolio is usually entitled eponymously to that ministry or department, most commonly known as the minister of finance, although some countries may also have varied titles for this particular position. For instance, Britain's equivalent of a finance minister is the chancellor of the exchequer, while the department that the chancellor oversees, HM Treasury, has four subordinate junior ministers, and it is actually the British prime minister who holds the historic, albeit ceremonial, title of First Lord of the Treasury, with the chancellor always being Second Lord of the Treasury. Another example is the United States, where the primary functions of the nation's finance minister are performed by the secretary of the treasury, though there is a separate but assistant position of U.S. treasurer with limited statutory duties, and, contrary to tradition, the director of the Office of Management and Budget, who is directly accountable to the president and not the treasury secretary, is charged with the main responsibility of budget drafting.

In some cases, the country's prime minister has concurrently served as finance minister. This was the case with Indira Gandhi of India and Eugenia Charles of Dominica, among others, who held both posts simultaneously. Moreover, the prime minister frequently designates the finance minister to serve in the simultaneous role of deputy prime minister to emphasize that position's importance.

== Sovereign states ==
Denotes incumbent finance minister
- Italics denote an acting finance minister or a minister of an extinct state
- Note: Many of the figures given for "term length" appear to be overly precise given that many of the start and end dates are only approximate.

Name	Image	Country	Continent	Mandate start	Mandate end	Term length
Indira Gandhi		India	Asia	16 July 1969	27 June 1970	346 days
Marie-Christine Mboukou		Central African Republic	Africa	9 June 1975	14 December 1976	1 year, 188 days
Ellen Johnson Sirleaf		Liberia	Africa	1979	12 April 1980	1 year, 102 days
Yun Gi-jong		North Korea	Asia	1980	1998	18 years, 0 days
Eugenia Charles		Dominica	North America	21 July 1980	14 June 1995	14 years, 328 days
Clara Boscaglia		San Marino	Europe	26 July 1986	22 July 1990	3 years, 361 days
Bintou Sango		Burkina Faso	Africa	1988	1991	3 years, 0 days
Shirley Kuo		Taiwan	Asia	22 July 1988	1 June 1990	1 year, 314 days
Benazir Bhutto		Pakistan	Asia	4 December 1988	6 August 1990	1 year, 245 days
Benazir Bhutto		Pakistan	Asia	26 January 1994	10 October 1996	2 years, 258 days
Eglée Iturbe de Blanco		Venezuela	South America	1989	1990	1 year, 0 days
Uta Nickel		East Germany	Europe	18 November 1989	12 April 1990	145 days
Licelott Marte de Barrios		Dominican Republic	North America	1990	1993	3 years, 0 days
Zélia Cardoso de Mello		Brazil	South America	15 March 1990	10 May 1991	1 year, 56 days
Ruth Richardson		New Zealand	Oceania	2 November 1990	29 November 1993	3 years, 27 days
Onur Borman		Northern Cyprus	Europe	1 January 1994	18 January 1995	1 year, 17 days
Elvyra Kunevičienė		Lithuania	Europe	13 January 1991	21 July 1992	1 year, 190 days
Irma Raquel Zelaya		Guatemala	North America	14 January 1991	16 April 1991	92 days
Marie-Michele Rey		Haiti	North America	13 February 1991	11 October 1991	240 days
Anne Wibble		Sweden	Europe	4 October 1991	7 October 1994	3 years, 3 days
Claudia Melnic		Moldova	Europe	4 August 1992	5 April 1994	1 year, 244 days
Ana Ordóñez de Molina		Guatemala	North America	1994	14 January 1996	2 years, 13 days
Christina Vucheva		Bulgaria	Europe	17 October 1994	25 January 1995	100 days
Chandrika Kumaratunga		Sri Lanka	Asia	12 November 1994	9 December 2001	7 years, 27 days
Susagna Arasanz		Andorra	Europe	7 December 1994	7 April 2001	6 years, 121 days
Indra Sāmīte		Latvia	Europe	25 May 1995	21 December 1995	210 days
Ruby Thoma		Nauru	Oceania	11 November 1996	28 November 1996	17 days
Gabriela Núñez		Honduras	North America	27 January 1998	27 January 2002	4 years, 0 days
Gabriela Núñez		Honduras	North America	29 June 2009	27 January 2010	212 days
Edith Nawakwi		Zambia	Africa	20 March 1998	29 June 1999	1 year, 101 days
Maritza Aguirre		Venezuela	South America	30 June 1998	30 June 1999	1 year, 0 days
Brigita Schmögnerová		Slovakia	Europe	30 October 1998	28 January 2002	3 years, 90 days
Ana Lucía Armijos		Ecuador	South America	15 February 1999	21 January 2000	340 days
Luísa Diogo		Mozambique	Africa	24 January 2000	3 February 2005	5 years, 10 days
Pia Gjellerup		Denmark	Europe	21 December 2000	27 November 2001	341 days
Mireia Maestre Cortadella		Andorra	Europe	7 April 2001	3 June 2005	4 years, 57 days
Dalia Grybauskaitė		Lithuania	Europe	3 July 2001	1 May 2004	2 years, 303 days
Halina Wasilewska-Trenkner		Poland	Europe	28 August 2001	19 October 2001	52 days
Fernanda Borges		East Timor	Asia	20 September 2001	20 May 2002	242 days
Maria Tebús		São Tomé and Príncipe	Africa	26 September 2001	9 August 2003	1 year, 317 days
Maria Tebús		São Tomé and Príncipe	Africa	21 April 2006	20 November 2007	1 year, 213 days
Enebay Atayeva		Turkmenistan	Asia	24 November 2001	15 November 2002	356 days
Zinaida Greceanîi		Moldova	Europe	8 February 2002	12 October 2005	3 years, 246 days
Manuela Ferreira Leite		Portugal	Europe	6 April 2002	17 July 2004	2 years, 100 days
Madalena Boavida		East Timor	Asia	20 May 2002	8 August 2007	5 years, 80 days
Ayaovi Demba Tignonkpa		Togo	Africa	3 December 2002	30 July 2003	239 days
Ljerka Marić		Bosnia and Herzegovina	Europe	13 January 2003	9 February 2007	4 years, 27 days
Saara Kuugongelwa-Amadhila		Namibia	Africa	8 May 2003	21 March 2015	11 years, 317 days
Georgina Barreiro Fajardo		Cuba	North America	21 June 2003	2 March 2009	5 years, 254 days
Ngozi Okonjo-Iweala		Nigeria	Africa	15 July 2003	21 June 2006	2 years, 341 days
Ngozi Okonjo-Iweala		Nigeria	Africa	11 July 2011	29 May 2015	3 years, 322 days
Juanita Amatong		Philippines	Asia	1 December 2003	14 February 2005	1 year, 75 days
Ayşe Dönmezer		Northern Cyprus	Europe	13 January 2004	4 August 2004	204 days
Antonieta Bonilla		Guatemala	North America	14 January 2004	14 January 2008	4 years, 0 days
Bibitäç Wekilowa		Turkmenistan	Asia	22 April 2004	8 March 2005	320 days
Margaret Keita		Gambia	Africa	10 March 2005	14 June 2005	96 days
Maria do Carmo Silveira		São Tomé and Príncipe	Africa	8 June 2005	21 April 2006	317 days
Magdalena Barreiro		Ecuador	South America	8 August 2005	28 December 2005	142 days
Kristin Halvorsen		Norway	Europe	17 October 2005	20 October 2009	4 years, 3 days
Teresa Lubińska		Poland	Europe	31 October 2005	7 January 2006	68 days
Felisa Miceli		Argentina	South America	28 November 2005	16 July 2007	1 year, 230 days
Sri Mulyani		Indonesia	Asia	7 December 2005	20 May 2010	4 years, 164 days
Sri Mulyani		Indonesia	Asia	27 July 2016	8 September 2025	9 years, 43 days
Zakia Meghji		Tanzania	Africa	6 January 2006	7 February 2008	2 years, 32 days
Zyta Gilowska		Poland	Europe	7 January 2006	24 June 2006	168 days
Zyta Gilowska		Poland	Europe	22 September 2006	7 September 2007	350 days
Zyta Gilowska		Poland	Europe	10 September 2007	16 November 2007	67 days
Natalya Korzhova		Kazakhstan	Asia	18 January 2006	13 November 2007	1 year, 299 days
Antoinette Sayeh		Liberia	Africa	2 February 2006	22 August 2008	2 years, 202 days
Nenadi Usman		Nigeria	Africa	21 June 2006	26 July 2007	1 year, 35 days
Rebeca Santos		Honduras	North America	3 July 2006	29 June 2009	2 years, 361 days
Cristina Duarte		Cape Verde	Africa	6 September 2006	22 April 2016	9 years, 229 days
Denise Sinankwa		Burundi	Africa	13 September 2006	13 July 2007	303 days
Vesna Arsić		Serbia	Europe	9 November 2006	14 November 2006	5 days
Christine Lagarde		France	Europe	19 June 2007	29 June 2011	4 years, 10 days
Irina Molokanova		Transnistria	Europe	4 July 2007	24 January 2012	4 years, 204 days
Irina Molokanova		Transnistria	Europe	11 January 2016	29 December 2017	1 year, 352 days
Emília Pires		East Timor	Asia	8 August 2007	11 February 2015	7 years, 187 days
Karen Nunez-Tesheira		Trinidad and Tobago	North America	7 November 2007	26 May 2010	2 years, 200 days
Clotilde Nizigama		Burundi	Africa	16 November 2007	2012	4 years, 46 days
Tazimkhan Kalibetova		Kyrgyzstan	Asia	28 December 2007	14 January 2009	1 year, 17 days
Mariana Durleșteanu		Moldova	Europe	31 March 2008	25 September 2009	1 year, 178 days
Ângela Viegas Santiago		São Tomé and Príncipe	Africa	22 June 2008	1 August 2010	2 years, 40 days
Diana Dragutinović		Serbia	Europe	7 July 2008	14 March 2011	2 years, 250 days
Wilma Salgado		Ecuador	South America	8 July 2008	16 September 2008	70 days
María Elsa Viteri		Ecuador	South America	16 September 2008	21 April 2010	1 year, 217 days
María Elsa Viteri		Ecuador	South America	6 March 2018	14 May 2018	69 days
Syda Bbumba		Uganda	Africa	16 February 2009	27 May 2011	2 years, 100 days
Lina Pedraza Rodríguez		Cuba	North America	2 March 2009	9 January 2019	9 years, 313 days
Sophie Thevenoux		Monaco	Europe	26 March 2009	14 January 2011	1 year, 294 days
Elena Salgado		Spain	Europe	7 April 2009	21 December 2011	2 years, 258 days
Ingrida Šimonytė		Lithuania	Europe	7 July 2009	13 December 2012	3 years, 159 days
Jenny Phillips		Costa Rica	North America	5 August 2009	8 May 2010	276 days
Raya Haffar al-Hassan		Lebanon	Asia	9 November 2009	13 June 2011	1 year, 216 days
Mercedes Aráoz		Peru	South America	22 December 2009	14 September 2010	266 days
Wonnie Boedhoe		Suriname	South America	12 August 2010	10 June 2011	302 days
Eveline Widmer-Schlumpf		Switzerland	Europe	1 November 2010	31 December 2015	5 years, 60 days
Elfreda Tamba		Liberia	Africa	5 November 2010	18 November 2010	13 days
Martina Dalić		Croatia	Europe	29 December 2010	23 December 2011	359 days
Dinara Shaydieva		Kyrgyzstan	Asia	31 January 2011	4 February 2011	4 days
Maria Fekter		Austria	Europe	21 April 2011	16 December 2013	2 years, 239 days
Rose Nakanaga		Micronesia	Oceania	11 May 2011	7 May 2012	362 days
Maria Kiwanuka		Uganda	Africa	27 May 2011	1 March 2015	3 years, 278 days
Adidjatou Mathys		Benin	Africa	28 May 2011	10 April 2012	318 days
Adelien Wijnerman		Suriname	South America	15 June 2011	9 October 2013	2 years, 116 days
Adelien Wijnerman		Suriname	South America	16 July 2025	Incumbent	1 year, 108 days
Jutta Urpilainen		Finland	Europe	22 June 2011	6 June 2014	2 years, 349 days
Oddný Harðardóttir		Iceland	Europe	31 December 2011	1 October 2012	275 days
Elena Girzhul		Transnistria	Europe	24 January 2012	25 December 2015	3 years, 335 days
Christina Liu		Taiwan	Asia	6 February 2012	30 May 2012	114 days
Marie-Carmelle Jean-Marie		Haiti	North America	16 May 2012	9 April 2013	328 days
Marie-Carmelle Jean-Marie		Haiti	North America	2 April 2014	18 January 2015	291 days
Katrín Júlíusdóttir		Iceland	Europe	1 October 2012	23 May 2013	234 days
Maria Luís Albuquerque		Portugal	Europe	24 July 2013	26 November 2015	2 years, 125 days
Bouaré Fily Sissoko		Mali	Africa	8 September 2013	10 January 2015	1 year, 124 days
Siv Jensen		Norway	Europe	16 October 2013	24 January 2020	6 years, 100 days
Saada Salum		Tanzania	Africa	20 January 2014	5 November 2015	1 year, 289 days
Ioana Petrescu		Romania	Europe	4 March 2014	15 December 2014	286 days
Magdalena Andersson		Sweden	Europe	3 October 2014	30 November 2021	7 years, 58 days
Maris Lauri		Estonia	Europe	3 November 2014	9 April 2015	157 days
Natalie Jaresko		Ukraine	Europe	2 December 2014	14 April 2016	1 year, 134 days
Santina Cardoso		East Timor	Asia	11 February 2015	15 September 2017	2 years, 216 days
Santina Cardoso		East Timor	Asia	1 July 2023	Incumbent	3 years, 123 days
Samsam Abdi Adan		Somaliland	Africa	7 March 2015	13 December 2017	2 years, 281 days
'Mamphono Khaketla		Lesotho	Africa	30 March 2015	8 November 2016	1 year, 223 days
Sihna N. Lawrence		Micronesia	Oceania	16 July 2015	11 May 2019	3 years, 299 days
Kemi Adeosun		Nigeria	Africa	11 November 2015	15 September 2018	2 years, 308 days
Anca Dragu		Romania	Europe	17 November 2015	4 January 2017	1 year, 48 days
Malado Kaba		Guinea	Africa	4 January 2016	28 May 2018	2 years, 134 days
Rosine Sori-Coulibaly		Burkina Faso	Africa	13 January 2016	24 January 2019	3 years, 11 days
Dana Reizniece-Ozola		Latvia	Europe	11 February 2016	23 January 2019	2 years, 346 days
Alenka Smerkolj		Slovenia	Europe	13 July 2016	21 September 2016	70 days
Lamia Zribi		Tunisia	Africa	27 August 2016	30 April 2017	246 days
Mateja Vraničar Erman		Slovenia	Europe	21 September 2016	13 September 2018	1 year, 357 days
Helga Vukaj		Albania	Europe	22 May 2017	17 August 2017	87 days
Lea Giménez		Paraguay	South America	6 June 2017	15 August 2018	1 year, 70 days
Vonintsalama Andriambololona		Madagascar	Africa	18 July 2017	24 January 2019	1 year, 190 days
Claudia Cooper		Peru	South America	17 September 2017	2 April 2018	197 days
Alena Schillerová		Czech Republic	Europe	13 December 2017	17 December 2021	4 years, 4 days
Alena Schillerová		Czech Republic	Europe	15 December 2025	Incumbent	321 days
Tatyana Kirova		Transnistria	Europe	1 January 2018	25 March 2022	4 years, 83 days
Teresa Czerwińska		Poland	Europe	9 January 2018	4 June 2019	1 year, 146 days
Margaret Mwanakatwe		Zambia	Africa	14 February 2018	14 July 2019	1 year, 150 days
Rocío Aguilar Montoya		Costa Rica	North America	8 May 2018	23 October 2019	1 year, 168 days
Ana Brnabić		Serbia	Europe	16 May 2018	29 May 2018	13 days
Mia Mottley		Barbados	North America	25 May 2018	Incumbent	8 years, 160 days
Shamshad Akhtar		Pakistan	Asia	5 June 2018	18 August 2018	74 days
Shamshad Akhtar		Pakistan	Asia	17 August 2023	4 March 2024	200 days
María Jesús Montero		Spain	Europe	7 June 2018	27 March 2026	7 years, 293 days
Oksana Markarova		Ukraine	Europe	8 June 2018	4 March 2020	1 year, 270 days
Sara Lobo Brites		East Timor	Asia	22 June 2018	29 May 2020	1 year, 342 days
Zainab Ahmed		Nigeria	Africa	17 September 2018	29 May 2023	4 years, 254 days
Baktygul Jeenbaeva		Kyrgyzstan	Asia	13 December 2018	Incumbent	7 years, 323 days
Anila Denaj		Albania	Europe	28 December 2018	2 September 2021	2 years, 248 days
Meisi Bolaños		Cuba	North America	9 January 2019	19 April 2023	4 years, 100 days
Nirmala Sitharaman		India	Asia	31 May 2019	Incumbent	7 years, 154 days
Natalia Gavrilița		Moldova	Europe	8 June 2019	14 November 2019	159 days
María Antonieta Alva		Peru	South America	3 October 2019	9 November 2020	1 year, 37 days
Vera Daves		Angola	Africa	8 October 2019	Incumbent	7 years, 24 days
Katri Kulmuni		Finland	Europe	10 December 2019	9 June 2020	182 days
Mariam Al-Aqeel		Kuwait	Asia	17 December 2019	16 February 2020	61 days
Azucena Arbeleche		Uruguay	South America	1 March 2020	28 February 2025	4 years, 364 days
Hykmete Bajrami		Kosovo	Europe	3 June 2020	24 February 2021	266 days
Chrystia Freeland		Canada	North America	18 August 2020	16 December 2024	4 years, 120 days
Gintarė Skaistė		Lithuania	Europe	7 December 2020	12 December 2024	4 years, 5 days
Keit Pentus-Rosimannus		Estonia	Europe	26 January 2021	19 October 2022	1 year, 266 days
Janet Yellen		United States	North America	26 January 2021	20 January 2025	3 years, 360 days
Annika Saarikko		Finland	Europe	27 May 2021	20 June 2023	2 years, 24 days
Sihem Boughdiri		Tunisia	Africa	2 August 2021	5 February 2025	3 years, 187 days
Rindra Rabarinirinarison		Madagascar	Africa	15 August 2021	28 October 2025	4 years, 88 days
Delina Ibrahimaj		Albania	Europe	18 September 2021	9 September 2023	1 year, 356 days
Yuriko Backes		Luxembourg	Europe	5 January 2022	17 November 2023	1 year, 316 days
Sigrid Kaag		Netherlands	Europe	10 January 2022	8 January 2024	1 year, 363 days
Alena Ruskevich		Transnistria	Europe	25 March 2022	Incumbent	4 years, 221 days
Magdalena Rzeczkowska		Poland	Europe	26 April 2022	27 November 2023	1 year, 215 days
Rositsa Velkova-Zheleva		Bulgaria	Europe	2 August 2022	6 June 2023	308 days
Elisabeth Svantesson		Sweden	Europe	18 October 2022	Incumbent	4 years, 14 days
Annely Akkermann		Estonia	Europe	19 October 2022	17 April 2023	180 days
Taif Sami Mohammed		Iraq	Asia	27 October 2022	Incumbent	4 years, 5 days
Karin Keller-Sutter		Switzerland	Europe	1 January 2023	Incumbent	3 years, 304 days
Chuang Tsui-yun		Taiwan	Asia	31 January 2023	Incumbent	3 years, 274 days
Veronica Sirețeanu		Moldova	Europe	16 February 2023	27 September 2023	223 days
Riikka Purra		Finland	Europe	20 June 2023	Incumbent	3 years, 134 days
Rose Nakanaga		Micronesia	Oceania	19 September 2023	Incumbent	3 years, 43 days
Þórdís Kolbrún R. Gylfadóttir		Iceland	Europe	14 October 2023	9 April 2024	178 days
Nicola Willis		New Zealand	Oceania	27 November 2023	Incumbent	2 years, 339 days
Lyudmila Petkova		Bulgaria	Europe	9 April 2024	16 January 2025	282 days
Rachel Reeves		United Kingdom	Europe	5 July 2024	20 July 2026	2 years, 15 days
Victoria Belous		Moldova	Europe	31 July 2024	1 November 2025	1 year, 93 days
Victoria Belous		Moldova	Europe	22 July 2026	Incumbent	102 days
Temenuzhka Petkova		Bulgaria	Europe	16 January 2025	19 February 2026	1 year, 34 days
Erica Shafudah		Namibia	Africa	22 March 2025	Incumbent	1 year, 224 days
Denisse Miralles		Peru	South America	14 October 2025	24 February 2026	133 days
Satsuki Katayama		Japan	Asia	21 October 2025	Incumbent	1 year, 11 days

== Constituent states, dependent territories, and autonomous regions ==
Denotes incumbent finance minister
- Italics denotes an acting finance minister or a minister of an extinct state/territory/region

Name	Image	State/Territory/Region	Parent country	Continent	Mandate start	Mandate end	Term length
Varvara Yakovleva		Russian Soviet Federative Socialist Republic	Soviet Union	Europe	21 December 1929	12 September 1937	7 years, 265 days
Carmen Ana Culpeper		Puerto Rico	United States	North America	2 January 1981	31 December 1984	3 years, 364 days
Jóngerð Purkhús		Faroe Islands	Denmark	Europe	1984	1989	5 years, 0 days
Bette Stephenson		Ontario	Canada	North America	17 May 1985	26 June 1985	40 days
Rosemary Follett		Australian Capital Territory	Australia	Oceania	16 May 1989	5 December 1989	203 days
Rosemary Follett		Australian Capital Territory	Australia	Oceania	18 June 1991	15 March 1995	3 years, 270 days
Carmen Lawrence		Western Australia	Australia	Oceania	12 February 1990	16 February 1993	3 years, 4 days
Amina Salum Ali		Zanzibar	Tanzania	Africa	25 October 1990	8 November 2000	10 years, 14 days
Ella Tromp-Yargazaray		Aruba	Netherlands	South America	1993	1994	1 year, 0 days
Monique Gagnon-Tremblay		Quebec	Canada	North America	18 October 1993	11 January 1994	85 days
Janice MacKinnon		Saskatchewan	Canada	North America	8 January 1993	27 June 1997	4 years, 170 days
Elizabeth Cull		British Columbia	Canada	North America	15 September 1993	17 June 1996	2 years, 276 days
Kate Carnell		Australian Capital Territory	Australia	Oceania	15 March 1995	7 August 1999	4 years, 145 days
Pauline Marois		Quebec	Canada	North America	3 November 1995	29 January 1996	87 days
Pauline Marois		Quebec	Canada	North America	8 March 2001	29 April 2003	2 years, 52 days
Joan Sheldon		Queensland	Australia	Oceania	19 February 1996	26 June 1998	2 years, 127 days
Pat Mella		Prince Edward Island	Canada	North America	27 November 1996	10 October 2003	6 years, 317 days
Xenia Vélez Silva		Puerto Rico	United States	North America	2 January 1997	31 December 2000	3 years, 364 days
Margaret Dyer-Howe		Montserrat	United Kingdom	North America	5 April 2001	2002	271 days
Pat Nelson		Alberta	Canada	North America	16 March 2001	25 November 2004	3 years, 254 days
Clare Martin		Northern Territory	Australia	Oceania	27 August 2001	17 October 2002	1 year, 51 days
Janet Ecker		Ontario	Canada	North America	15 April 2002	23 October 2003	1 year, 191 days
Ersilia de Lannooy		Netherlands Antilles	Netherlands	South America	3 June 2002	10 October 2010	8 years, 129 days
Paula Cox		Bermuda	United Kingdom	North America	22 January 2004	18 December 2012	8 years, 331 days
Shirley McClellan		Alberta	Canada	North America	25 November 2004	15 December 2006	2 years, 20 days
Carole Taylor		British Columbia	Canada	North America	16 June 2005	23 June 2008	3 years, 7 days
Anna Bligh		Queensland	Australia	Oceania	2 February 2006	13 September 2007	1 year, 223 days
Armelle Merceron		French Polynesia	France	Oceania	29 December 2006	31 August 2007	245 days
Monique Jérôme-Forget		Quebec	Canada	North America	18 April 2007	8 April 2009	1 year, 355 days
Pat Atkinson		Saskatchewan	Canada	North America	31 May 2007	21 November 2007	174 days
Aleqa Hammond		Greenland	Denmark	North America	1 July 2007	26 September 2008	1 year, 87 days
Delia Lawrie		Northern Territory	Australia	Oceania	30 November 2007	28 August 2012	4 years, 272 days
Iris Evans		Alberta	Canada	North America	12 March 2008	15 January 2010	1 year, 309 days
Katy Gallagher		Australian Capital Territory	Australia	Oceania	11 November 2008	30 June 2011	2 years, 231 days
Rosann Wowchuk		Manitoba	Canada	North America	3 November 2009	3 October 2011	1 year, 334 days
Lara Giddings		Tasmania	Australia	Oceania	6 December 2010	31 March 2014	3 years, 115 days
Maliina Abelsen		Greenland	Denmark	North America	March 2011	5 April 2013	2 years, 35 days
Sonia Backès		New Caledonia	France	Oceania	10 June 2011	5 June 2014	2 years, 360 days
Maureen MacDonald		Nova Scotia	Canada	North America	30 May 2012	22 October 2013	1 year, 145 days
Robyn Lambley		Northern Territory	Australia	Oceania	4 September 2012	6 March 2013	183 days
Julianna O'Connor-Connolly		Cayman Islands	United Kingdom	North America	19 December 2012	28 May 2013	160 days
Jennifer Howard		Manitoba	Canada	North America	18 October 2013	3 November 2014	1 year, 16 days
Diana Whalen		Nova Scotia	Canada	North America	22 October 2013	24 July 2015	1 year, 275 days
Charlene Johnson		Newfoundland and Labrador	Canada	North America	29 January 2014	5 September 2014	219 days
Melba Acosta Febo		Puerto Rico	United States	North America	27 October 2014	31 July 2016	1 year, 278 days
Gladys Berejiklian		New South Wales	Australia	Oceania	2 April 2015	30 January 2017	1 year, 303 days
Kristina Háfoss		Faroe Islands	Denmark	Europe	15 September 2015	16 September 2019	4 years, 1 day
Cathy Bennett		Newfoundland and Labrador	Canada	North America	14 December 2015	31 July 2017	1 year, 229 days
Cathy Rogers		New Brunswick	Canada	North America	6 June 2016	8 November 2018	2 years, 155 days
Nicole Manison		Northern Territory	Australia	Oceania	31 August 2016	7 September 2020	4 years, 7 days
Sharlene Cartwright-Robinson		Turks and Caicos Islands	United Kingdom	North America	20 December 2016	20 February 2021	4 years, 62 days
Lourdes Alberto		Curaçao	Netherlands	South America	24 March 2017	29 May 2017	66 days
Carole James		British Columbia	Canada	North America	18 July 2017	26 November 2020	3 years, 131 days
Karen Casey		Nova Scotia	Canada	North America	15 June 2017	23 February 2021	3 years, 253 days
Donna Harpauer		Saskatchewan	Canada	North America	30 August 2017	7 November 2024	7 years, 69 days
Xiomara Maduro		Aruba	Netherlands	South America	17 November 2017	Incumbent	8 years, 349 days
Jackie Trad		Queensland	Australia	Oceania	12 December 2017	10 May 2020	2 years, 150 days
Susan Pinel		Jersey	United Kingdom	Europe	7 June 2018	22 June 2022	4 years, 15 days
Rebecca Evans; Cabinet Minister for Finance		Wales	United Kingdom	Europe	13 December 2018	11 September 2024	5 years, 273 days
Darlene Compton		Prince Edward Island	Canada	North America	9 May 2019	3 April 2023	3 years, 329 days
Diane Dodds; Minister for the Economy		Northern Ireland	United Kingdom	Europe	11 January 2020	14 June 2021	1 year, 154 days
Kate Forbes; Cabinet Secretary for Finance		Scotland	United Kingdom	Europe	17 February 2020	28 March 2023	3 years, 39 days
Selina Robinson		British Columbia	Canada	North America	26 November 2020	7 December 2022	2 years, 11 days
Natasha Fyles		Northern Territory	Australia	Oceania	13 May 2022	23 May 2022	10 days
Eva Lawler		Northern Territory	Australia	Oceania	23 May 2022	28 August 2024	2 years, 96 days
Katrine Conroy		British Columbia	Canada	North America	7 December 2022	18 November 2024	1 year, 347 days
Shona Robison; Cabinet Secretary for Finance		Scotland	United Kingdom	Europe	29 March 2023	20 May 2026	3 years, 52 days
Caoimhe Archibald; Minister for Finance		Northern Ireland	United Kingdom	Europe	3 February 2024	3 February 2025	1 year, 0 days
Rita Saffioti		Western Australia	Australia	Oceania	8 June 2024	Incumbent	2 years, 146 days
Lia Finocchiaro		Northern Territory	Australia	Oceania	28 August 2024	9 September 2024	12 days
Brenda Bailey		British Columbia	Canada	North America	18 November 2024	Incumbent	1 year, 348 days
Jaclyn Symes		Victoria	Australia	Oceania	19 December 2024	4 August 2026	1 year, 228 days
Elin Jones; Cabinet Minister for Finance		Wales	United Kingdom	Europe	13 May 2026	Incumbent	172 days
Jenny Gilruth; Cabinet Secretary for Finance		Scotland	United Kingdom	Europe	20 May 2026	Incumbent	165 days

== See also ==
- Financial policy
- Economic policy
- Commercial policy
- Fiscal policy
- Financial regulation
- Finance minister
- List of current finance ministers
- Ministry of Finance
