= Francis Itimai =

Current Governor of Yap

Honorable Francis Itimai
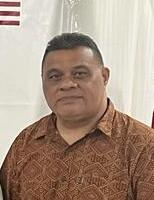
- Itimai in 2023

10th Governor of Yap
- Incumbent
- Assumed office 29 May 2025
- Preceded by: Charles Chieng

Personal details
- Born: Lamotrek, Yap

Francis I. Itimai is the incumbent governor of Yap State, Micronesia. From 2023 until 2025, he served as lieutenant governor under Charles Chieng. After Chieng's death on 28 May 2025, Itimai became governor of Yap.

== Political history ==
In 2011, Itimai was nominated as Secretary of the Department of Transportation, Communications and Infrastructure by then-president Manny Mori. During the 2018 Yap elections, Itimai ran as running mate for incumbent president Tony Ganngiyan, losing to Henry Falan. Ganniyan and Itimai received 2,074 votes, as opposed to Falan's 2,222.

In 2022, Itimai ran as a running mate again, this time to Charles Chieng. The two won, receiving 1,640 votes. During his time in office, he oversaw a proposed expansion of Yap International Airport. Francis Itimai was elected lieutenant governor of Yap on 9 January 2023, serving under Chieng. In April and May 2025, Itimai served as acting governor due to Chieng's illness. On 28 May 2025, Chieng died and Itimai became Governor on 29 May 2025.
