= 2018 Yap elections =

Election in Micronesia

- November 6, 2018
Nominee	Henry Falan	Tony Ganngiyan
Party	Independent	Independent
Running mate	Jesse J. Salalu	Francis I. Itimai
Popular vote	2,222	2,074
Percentage	51.7%	48.3%
Governor before election
Tony Ganngiyan
Elected Governor
Henry Falan

The 2018 Yap gubernatorial election took place on Tuesday, November 6, 2018, to elect the Governor and Lieutenant Governor of the Yap State in the Federated States of Micronesia to a four-year term in office. The election coincided with the Yap State general election, including legislative contests to select Senators of the Yap State Legislature.

Incumbent Governor Tony Ganngiyan, who was elected in 2014, was seeking re-election for a second term.

10 seats of the Yap State Legislature were also up for election.

== Results ==
Yap gubernatorial election, 2018
Party	Candidate	Votes	%	±%
Independent	Henry Falan	2,222	51.7%	
Independent	Tony Ganngiyan	2,074	48.3%	
Majority				
Total votes		4,296	100.0%	

Jerry G. Fagolimul, Vincent A. Figir, Nicholas Figirlaarwon, Joseph Giliko, Kensley Ikosia, John Mafel, John J. Masiwemai, Jesse Raglmar-Subolmar, Theodore Rutun, and Joseph B. Tiuchemal were elected to the Yap State Legislature.
