= Typhoon Jelawat (2018) =

Pacific typhoon in 2018

Typhoon Jelawat (Caloy)
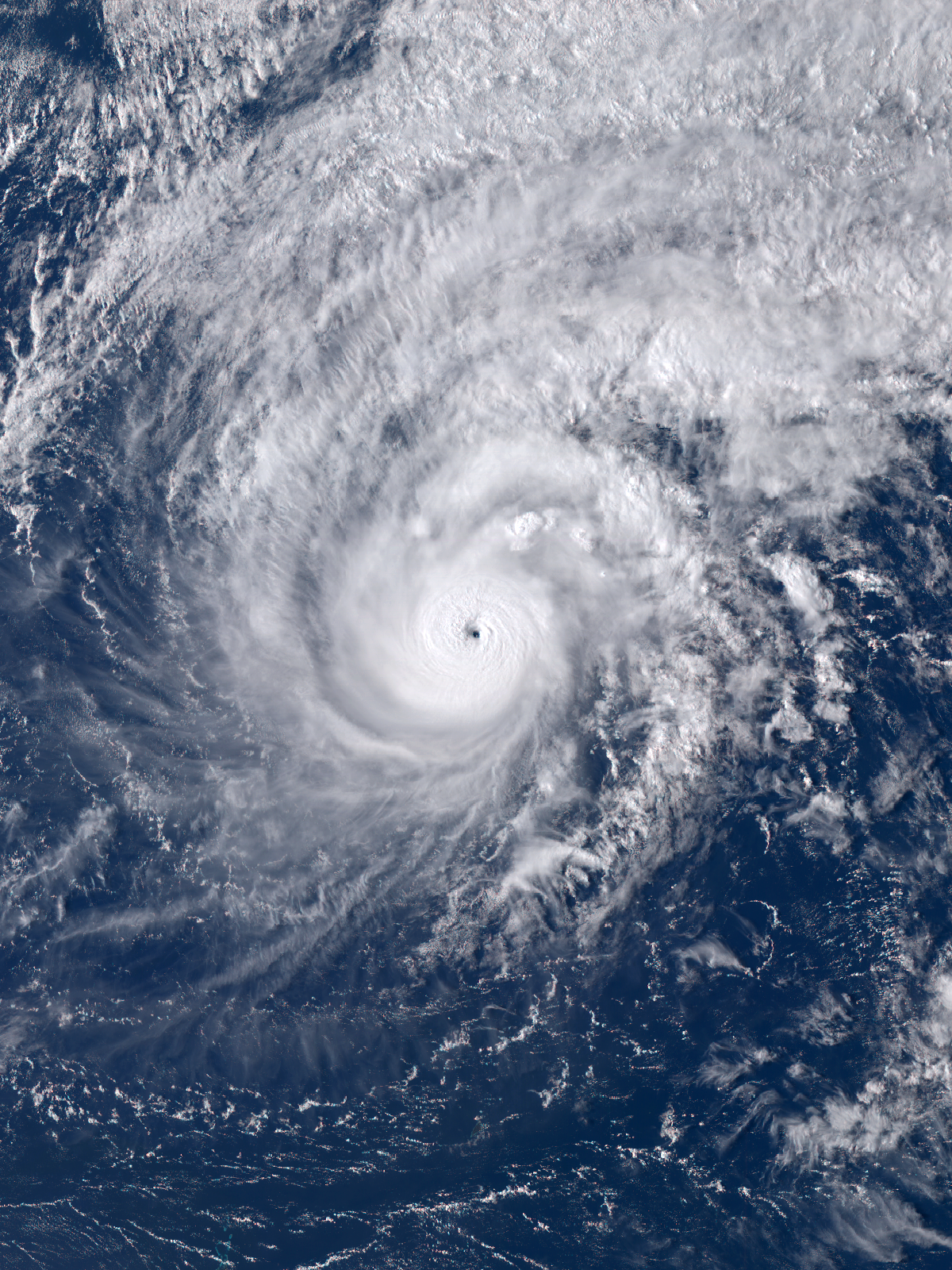
- Jelawat rapidly intensifying on the afternoon of March 30

Meteorological history
- Formed: March 24, 2018
- Dissipated: April 1, 2018

Violent typhoon
- 10-minute sustained (JMA)
- Highest winds: 195 km/h (120 mph)
- Lowest pressure: 915 hPa (mbar); 27.02 inHg

Category 4-equivalent super typhoon
- 1-minute sustained (SSHWS/JTWC)
- Highest winds: 240 km/h (150 mph)
- Lowest pressure: 926 hPa (mbar); 27.34 inHg

Overall effects
- Fatalities: 3 total
- Areas affected: Caroline Islands, Mariana Islands, California
- IBTrACS
- Part of the 2018 Pacific typhoon season

Typhoon Jelawat (Note: The name Jelawat (Malay: jelawat, [dʒəlawat]) was contributed by Malaysia and refers to the sultan fish (Leptobarbus hoevenii) in Malay.) was a powerful typhoon that affected the Caroline Islands in late March 2018. The third tropical storm and the first typhoon of the 2018 Pacific typhoon season, Jelawat originated as a tropical disturbance that struck the Federated States of Micronesia before organizing into a tropical depression on March 24. It further intensified into a tropical storm on the following day, according to the Japan Meteorological Agency, receiving the name Jelawat. Drifting northward, the storm remained unorganized while staying east of the Philippines, though environmental conditions became more favorable along its path. On March 29, Jelawat took an unexpected sharp turn east as it intensified into a typhoon. Upon shifting northeast, Jelawat rapidly intensified on March 30 due to low vertical wind shear and substantial outflow, peaking as a Category 4-equivalent super typhoon. Shortly afterward, the storm began to weaken as wind shear sharply increased, falling below typhoon strength on March 31. The storm transitioned into a subtropical cyclone on April 1, before dissipating on that same day.

The tropical disturbance that later became Typhoon Jelawat flooded parts of the Federated States of Micronesia. Most of the impact occurred in Pohnpei, where a person died and another was injured from a landslide. Infrastructure was critically damaged and many homes were flooded throughout the island. After Jelawat had dissipated, its remnants produced rip currents that claimed the life of a woman in Guam. These remnants flowed into an atmospheric river that extended to California, flooding areas of the U.S. state. Traffic was disrupted among the San Francisco Bay Area and other areas, resulting in four injuries and one death. In response to the disaster in the Federated States of Micronesia, the country received assistance from the United States.

== Meteorological history ==
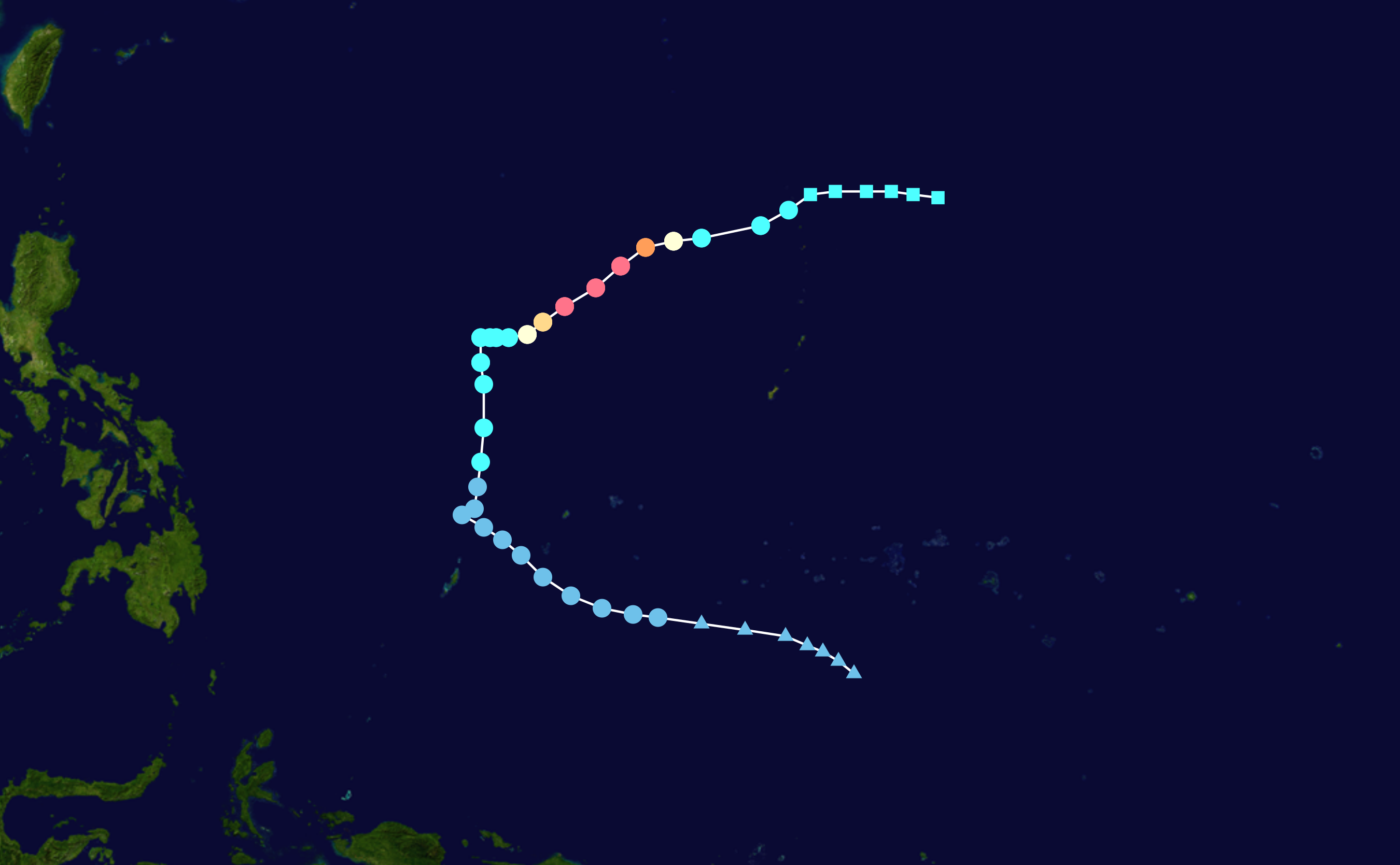
Map plotting the storm's track and intensity, according to the Saffir–Simpson scale Map key Saffir–Simpson scale Tropical depression (≤38 mph, ≤62 km/h) Tropical storm (39–73 mph, 63–118 km/h) Category 1 (74–95 mph, 119–153 km/h) Category 2 (96–110 mph, 154–177 km/h) Category 3 (111–129 mph, 178–208 km/h) Category 4 (130–156 mph, 209–251 km/h) Category 5 (≥157 mph, ≥252 km/h) Unknown Storm type Tropical cyclone Subtropical cyclone Extratropical cyclone, remnant low, tropical disturbance, or monsoon depression

During a strengthening phase of the Madden–Julian oscillation, a broad tropical disturbance centered at Pohnpei was observed on March 16, 2018, with widespread thunderstorm activity—or convection—across the island, Kosrae, and nearby islands and atolls of the Federated States of Micronesia. Nascent rainbands were later revealed wrapping around the system's defined low-level circulation. By situating over low vertical wind shear and very warm sea surface temperatures, the tropical disturbance underwent further development, with diverging winds aloft and poleward outflow also aiding the system. Moreover, an equatorial Rossby wave reinforced humidity in the atmosphere, facilitating the process. For the following days, thunderstorms continued to burst over the system's partially-exposed center, though the bulk of it was displaced to the north. By March 24, the system was marked as a tropical depression by the Japan Meteorological Agency (JMA). (Note: The Japan Meteorological Agency is the official Regional Specialized Meteorological Center for the western Pacific Ocean.) The Joint Typhoon Warning Center (JTWC) (Note: The Joint Typhoon Warning Center is a joint United States Navy – United States Air Force task force that issues tropical cyclone warnings for the western Pacific Ocean and other regions.) followed suit shortly afterward, giving it the numeral identifier 03W, citing the persistent deep convection to the northeast of the storm's center and strong outflow amplified by the mid-latitude westerlies. The following day, the JMA designated the system a tropical storm, and assigned the newly-formed cyclone the name Jelawat. The JTWC however, still retained the storm's status as a tropical depression at the time.

Throughout March 26, moderate wind shear displaced disorganized and fragmented convection to the north of the circulation, hindering the storm's ability to organize. At 00:00 UTC of March 27, the system crossed the eastern boundary of the area of warning responsibility of the Philippine Atmospheric, Geophysical, and Astronomical Services Administration, prompting the agency to assign the local name Caloy. Convection strengthened over the northwest quadrant of the fully-exposed center; vertical wind shear was subdued by outflow, allowing for additional intensification. Initially moving west-northwestward, the storm decelerated significantly after a subtropical ridge extended to the north of the system. With time, convection bloomed over the system, obscuring the circulation. Tracking towards a region of favorable wind shear, Jelawat moved north along the 135°E boundary of the Philippine Area of Responsibility, before exiting early March 28. Following further consolidation of convection with banding features over all quadrants, the JTWC upgraded Jelawat to a tropical storm. At 06:00 UTC, Jelawat acquired severe tropical storm status, with 10-minute sustained winds of 95 km/h (60 mph) assessed by the JMA. With the storm being by the western side of a weakening ridge, a broadening central dense overcast emerged. An eye was indicated through microwave imaging shortly thereafter; the irregular eye was detected on satellite imagery by early March 29. Also around that time, the JMA estimated that Jelawat had intensified into a typhoon. Contrary to forecasts, the storm made a sharp turn east; Jelawat had entered a saddle point between subtropical ridges to the east and west. Jelawat continued to stockpile convection within the formative eye while also maintaining substantial poleward outflow boosted by a subtropical westerly jet; accordingly, the JTWC classified the storm as a typhoon.

Typhoon Jelawat rapidly intensifying on March 30, west of the Mariana Islands

Drifting northeastward in favorable conditions on March 30, the storm underwent explosive intensification, and exhibited a sharp 19-kilometer-wide (12 mi) eye surrounded by symmetric deep convection. By 12:00 UTC, Jelawat attained its peak intensity, with 10-minute maximum sustained winds of 195 km/h (120 mph) and the lowest barometric pressure of 915 hPa (27.02 inHg) assessed by the JMA. The JTWC estimated 1-minute sustained winds of 240 km/h (150 mph), re-classifying Jelawat as a super typhoon. (Note: A super typhoon is an unofficial category used by the Joint Typhoon Warning Center (JTWC) for a typhoon with winds of at least 240 km/h (150 mph).) The eye had shrunk by almost half its initial size, and despite the conducive conditions, Jelawat was approaching an area of high vertical wind shear associated with the subtropical jet. Furthermore, sea surface temperature reduction and dry air began to impact the system as well. By March 31, Jelawat's structure rapidly deteriorated from the unfavorable conditions. Convection later became very disorganized, with the deepest of it constricted to the northeast of the center. By 18:00 UTC, the JMA declared that Jelawat had weakened into a tropical storm. While passing north of Pagan on April 1, the ragged circulation interacted with the baroclinic zone and began possessing frontal characteristics. As such, the JTWC assessed the cyclone as a subtropical storm, and ceased issuing advisories on the system. The JMA continued to monitor the system until it had dissipated by 12:00 UTC.

== Preparations and impact ==
=== Micronesia and Palau ===
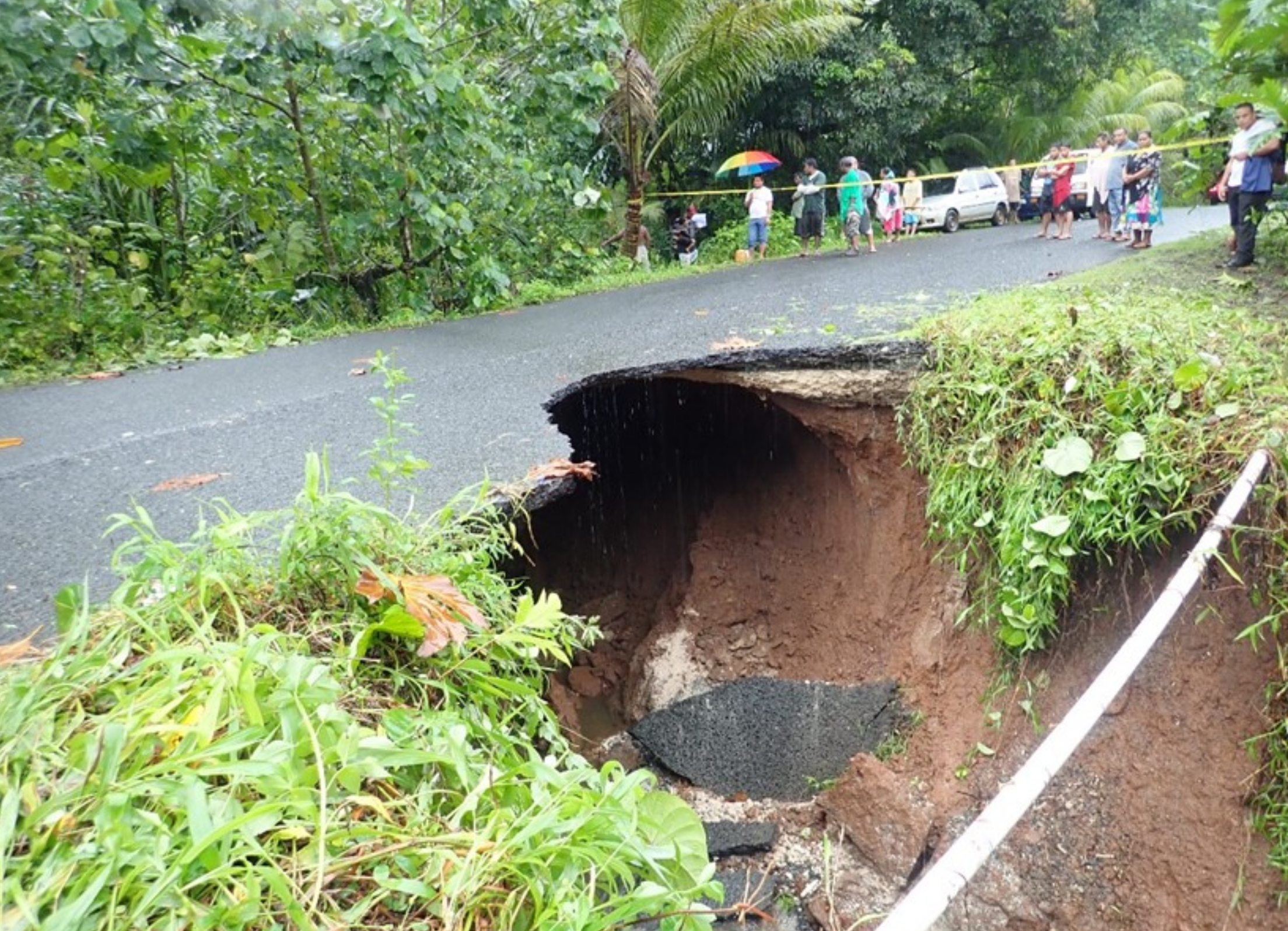
Damaged road at Pohnpei caused by the pre-Jelawat disturbance

The National Weather Service (NWS) office in Guam released a Special Weather Statement for Pohnpei and Kosrae due to the potential of flash floods and landslides, stating that the system had already produced almost 180 mm (7 in) of rainfall over the islands. The precursor disturbance to Jelawat passed slowly through Pohnpei, yielding a total 537 mm (21.15 in) of rainfall on parts of the island on March 16–17, resulting in flooding and 24 landslides; one of the landslides killed a person and seriously injured another. The downpour along with high waves inundated and damaged roads, likewise to overflowing rivers. Eleven bridges and culverts were damaged, and throughout the events, a landslide warning and six flood statements were announced by the island's local Weather Service Office. A number of homes were flooded in every municipality on the island. Nearly 250 houses were either damaged or destroyed, and critical damage was done to infrastructure as a result of the heavy rainfall.

On March 25, the NWS began issuing tropical storm watches over Ulithi, Fais, Yap, and Ngulu in Yap State, and also Kayangel and Koror in Palau, before it was upgraded to a warning for Yap, Ngulu, Kayangel, and Koror later that day; the warning for Koror was soon canceled the next day by the National Emergency Management Office of Palau, as Jelawat's winds were toned down to 25 to 40 km/h (15 to 25 mph), with gusts of 50 km/h (30 mph). In addition, 25 to 51 mm (1 to 2 in) of rain fell over Palau. Dangerous levels of sea and surf conditions were reported, though storm surge was not a threat to the island nation. The watches for Ulithi and Fais were also canceled, before the warnings for Yap and Ngulu followed suit. As Jelawat moved away from Palau, the warning for Kayangel was canceled on March 27. Jelawat poured 149 mm (5.87 in) of rain over Yap as the system passed to the south throughout March 24–29, keeping the island chain under the influence of its outer rainbands. Chuuk State also received heavy showers, causing minor flooding of roadways.

=== Mariana Islands ===
Northwest swells from Jelawat were expected to increase surf levels from 2.4 to 3.0 m (8 to 10 ft) across the reefs of the Northern Mariana Islands, prompting the issuance of high surf advisories. On March 31, the NWS hoisted a tropical storm watch for Agrihan. That same day, the Governor of the Northern Mariana Islands, Ralph Torres, placed the island into Condition of Readiness 3—indicating possible winds of 93 km/h (58 mph) within 72 hours. A tropical storm warning was then issued for Agrihan and Pagan on April 1, as it was forecasted that Jelawat would pass 40 km (25 mi) north of the former, though they were canceled later that day. The high surf advisories across the archipelago were lifted, as Jelawat was rapidly weakening from vertical wind shear, and no longer posed a threat towards the islands.

The remnants of Jelawat produced surfs of 7.3 m (24 ft) off Saipan and 5.5 m (18 ft) off Ritidian Point. Nevertheless, no damage from the effects of Jelawat was reported in the Northern Mariana Islands. On April 3, a woman in Guam drowned after strong surfs combined with rip currents stranded her in water. She was rescued along with two other swimmers who were also stranded, but was later pronounced dead. Additionally, Jelawat induced a surge of Indo-Pacific man-of-war sightings across the east and west coasts of Guam, though no one was reported to have been stung by them.

=== California ===
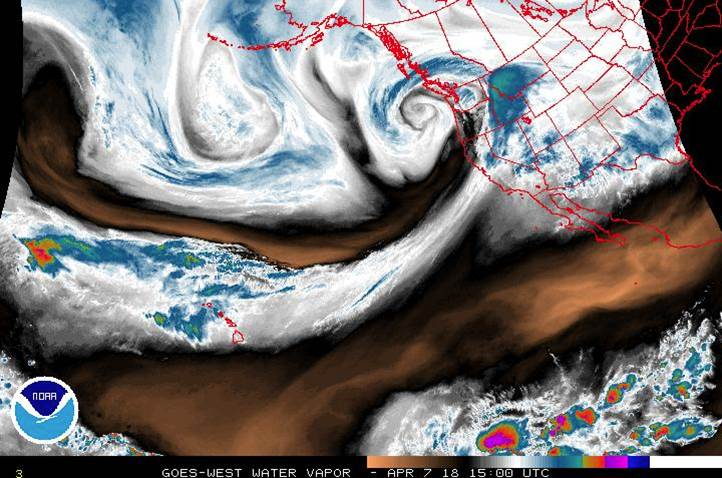
Water vapor imagery of an atmospheric river over California on April 7, associated with the remnants of Typhoon Jelawat

Around early April, Jelawat's remnants entered an atmospheric river originating from Hawaii, dubbed a Pineapple Express, after its moist core flowed into the western end of the channel, reaching California; the moisture was entrained in and maintained by an Aleutian low. In response, flood warnings and watches were in effect for the Sierra Nevada, the Santa Cruz Mountains, and other areas of the state. The Yosemite National Park was closed down as a precaution. 147 flights at San Francisco International Airport were canceled due to the water supply, whereas nearly 400 were either delayed or canceled. The opener between the San Francisco Giants and Los Angeles Dodgers was rained out. The Department of Water Resources monitored the Oroville Dam, though by the end of the heavy rain, the department did not need to utilize a partially rebuilt spillway, which was destroyed back in February last year and led to a crisis.

The Merced River rose 1.2 m (4 ft) above flood stage, flooding campgrounds and also meadows and roadways. Flooding also occurred along the Truckee River near Lake Tahoe. In Loleta, heavy rain produced a sinkhole that swallowed a car, injuring a woman. Towns nearby the Russian River experienced nearly 130 mm (5 in) of rain. A traffic accident in Highway 4 in Pittsburg injured two people. Inundation, landslides, and erosions caused roads at Sonoma County to be closed, which had downed trees and power lines. Two people along with a dog were rescued from a car that was washed out on a flooded road. About 30 traffic accidents took place through Highway 101 in the county, although no one was seriously injured. At Sonoma Valley, a power outage affected customers of the Pacific Gas and Electric Company, though the utility stated that it had extra crews in seven Bay Area counties to respond to the power disruption. At Bodega Bay, 150 mm (6 in) of rainfall was recorded in a day, more than the total rainfall of last month. A power outage was reported in Walnut Creek. In Highway 17 between Los Gatos and Altamont, about ten traffic accidents were reported, causing one minor injury. Another incident in Highway 4 was reported when a truck spun out on eastbound at Port Chicago, closing three lanes of traffic and entangling the East Bay freeway. In Grizzly Peak Boulevard, an emergency crew was called when a car fell 30 m (100 ft) off an embankment; their efforts were hindered by fog alongside rain and wind. A woman, who was previously reported missing, was found dead near the vehicle about 120 m (400 ft) down a hill.

== Aftermath ==
The Governor of Pohnpei, Marcelo Peterson declared a state of emergency, and the president of the Federated States of Micronesia (FSM), Peter M. Christian, issued a disaster declaration around mid-March 2018, releasing $50,000 from the country's Disaster Assistance Emergency Fund. On May 6, a declaration from the U.S. ambassador to the FSM, Robert A. Riley III, allowed the Federal Emergency Management Agency (FEMA) and United States Agency for International Development (USAID) to assign a damage assessment across the FSM. Through the Compact of Free Association between the national governments, U.S. President Donald Trump issued a disaster declaration on July 20, and released funds for emergency relief and reconstruction assistance, after Christian requested a disaster declaration on June 13. USAID's Bureau for Humanitarian Assistance assisted in agriculture rehabilitation, whereas the USAID division in the Philippines supported the repair of the damaged homes as well as infrastructure and utilities. Relief and reconstruction funding from USAID totaled nearly $4.5 million.

== See also ==
- Weather of 2018
- Tropical cyclones in 2018
- Other storms named Jelawat
- Other storms named Caloy
- Typhoon Bess (1979) – A typhoon that took a similar path and also formed in the month of March
- Typhoon Mitag (2002) – The first super typhoon on record in March
- Typhoon Dolphin (2015) – A typhoon which also affected Pohnpei early in its life
- Typhoon Wutip (2019) – The most powerful February typhoon on record; affected some of the same areas as Jelawat
