= List of storms named Caloy =

The name Caloy has been used for seven tropical cyclones in the Philippine Area of Responsibility by PAGASA in the Western Pacific Ocean.

- Tropical Depression Caloy (2002) (03W, Caloy) – traversed the Southern Philippines
- Typhoon Chanchu (2006) (T0601, 02W, Caloy) – struck the Philippines and China
- Typhoon Chanthu (2010) (T1003, 04W, Caloy) – struck the Philippines and China
- Tropical Depression Caloy (2014) (04W, Caloy) – made landfall on Mindanao
- Typhoon Jelawat (2018) (T1803, 03W, Caloy) – made impact in the Caroline Islands and Mariana Islands
- Typhoon Chaba (2022) (T2203, 04W, Caloy) – made landfall in southwestern Guangdong province, China
- Tropical Storm Hagupit (2026) (T2605, 05W, Caloy) – a weak tropical storm that minimally affected Yap

| Preceded by Basyang | Pacific typhoon season names Caloy | Succeeded by Domeng |
