= 1986 Nauruan parliamentary election =

Parliamentary elections were held in Nauru on 6 December 1986. As there were no political parties, all candidates ran as independents. However, the Parliament elected had two opposing groups holding nine seats each, resulting in a deadlock. To resolve the issue, Parliament was dissolved on 30 December, prompting fresh elections in January.

The elections saw the first-ever female candidate elected, with Ruby Dediya becoming MP for Anetan/Ewa and subsequently being appointed Minister for Finance. She retained the position after the 1987 elections.

== Results ==
Party	Votes	%	Seats
Independents	2,126	100.00	18
Total	2,126	100.00	18
Valid votes	2,126	97.12	
Invalid/blank votes	63	2.88	
Total votes	2,189	100.00	
Source: Gazette, IPU

=== By constituency ===
Constituency	Candidate	Votes	Notes
Aiwo	René Reynaldo Harris	161.233	Elected
Aiwo	Kinza Godfrey Clodumar	126.766	Elected
Aiwo	Patrick Deiri Cook	98.633	
Aiwo	David Libokomedo Agir	89.033	
Aiwo	Allan Ririenang Thoma	87.216	
Aiwo	Ephraim Rotemwemweo Gadabu	86.366	
Aiwo	Invalid/blank votes	9	
Aiwo	Total votes cast	274	
Anabar	Ludwig Derangadage Scotty	114.75	Elected
Anabar	Maien Deireragea	86.083	Elected
Anabar	Godfrey Tsine Waidabu	78.583	
Anabar	Deinedo Dori Deireragea	74.75	
Anabar	Invalid/blank votes	1	
Anabar	Total votes cast	171	
Anetan	Roy Demanganuwe Degoregore	153.216	Elected
Anetan	Ruby Eidagarube Dediya	108.866	Elected
Anetan	Lawrence Stephen	96.333	
Anetan	Remy Gerard Namuduk	78.95	
Anetan	Bucky Adago Denauwea Ika	78.6	
Anetan	Abago Vassal Gadeongin	76.933	
Anetan	Invalid/blank votes	14	
Anetan	Total votes cast	256	
Boe	Hammer DeRoburt	130.916	Elected
Boe	Kenas Nangindait Aroi	102.25	Elected
Boe	Vollmer Mercury Appi	90.75	
Boe	Joske Arthur Teabuge	82.333	
Boe	Invalid/blank votes	2	
Boe	Total votes cast	197	
Buada	Vinson Franco Detenamo	132.083	Elected
Buada	Reuben Kun	126.916	Elected
Buada	Manfred Rabaima Depaune	84.166	
Buada	Alec Hindmarsh Stephen	81.833	
Buada	Invalid/blank votes	1	
Buada	Total votes cast	205	
Meneng	Bobby Ingitebo Ralph Eoe	156.752	Elected
Meneng	Paul Denabuawa Jeremiah	116.658	Elected
Meneng	Vinci Neil Clodumar	106.414	
Meneng	Joshua Porthos Bwaidongo Bop	105.226	
Meneng	Parcelle James Dedagenumon Bop	100.975	
Meneng	Nimrod Botelanga	100.402	
Meneng	Alec Dogaben Harris	78.122	
Meneng	Ralph Steven	72.548	
Meneng	Invalid/blank votes	21	
Meneng	Total votes cast	329	
Ubenide	Bernard Dowiyogo	241.910	Elected
Ubenide	Kennan Ranibok Adeang	232.148	Elected
Ubenide	Robidok Bagewa Buraro Detudamo	228.651	Elected
Ubenide	Derog Gioura	196.960	Elected
Ubenide	Paul Lawrence Maginkieo Ribauw	132.765	
Ubenide	Mark Dennis Reuben Kun	129.560	
Ubenide	Eddie Nelson Scotty	123.213	
Ubenide	Cagney Scotty	98.142	
Ubenide	Invalid/blank votes	13	
Ubenide	Total votes cast	522	
Yaren	Pres Nimes Ekwona	160.666	Elected
Yaren	Anthony Kododo Audoa	131.833	Elected
Yaren	Ludwig Dowong Keke	102.416	
Yaren	Anton Jimwareiy	90.5	
Yaren	Invalid/blank votes	2	
Yaren	Total votes cast	235	
Source: Republic of Nauru Government Gazette, 8 December 1986
