= Typhoon Chaba (2022) =

Pacific typhoon in 2022

Typhoon Chaba (Caloy)
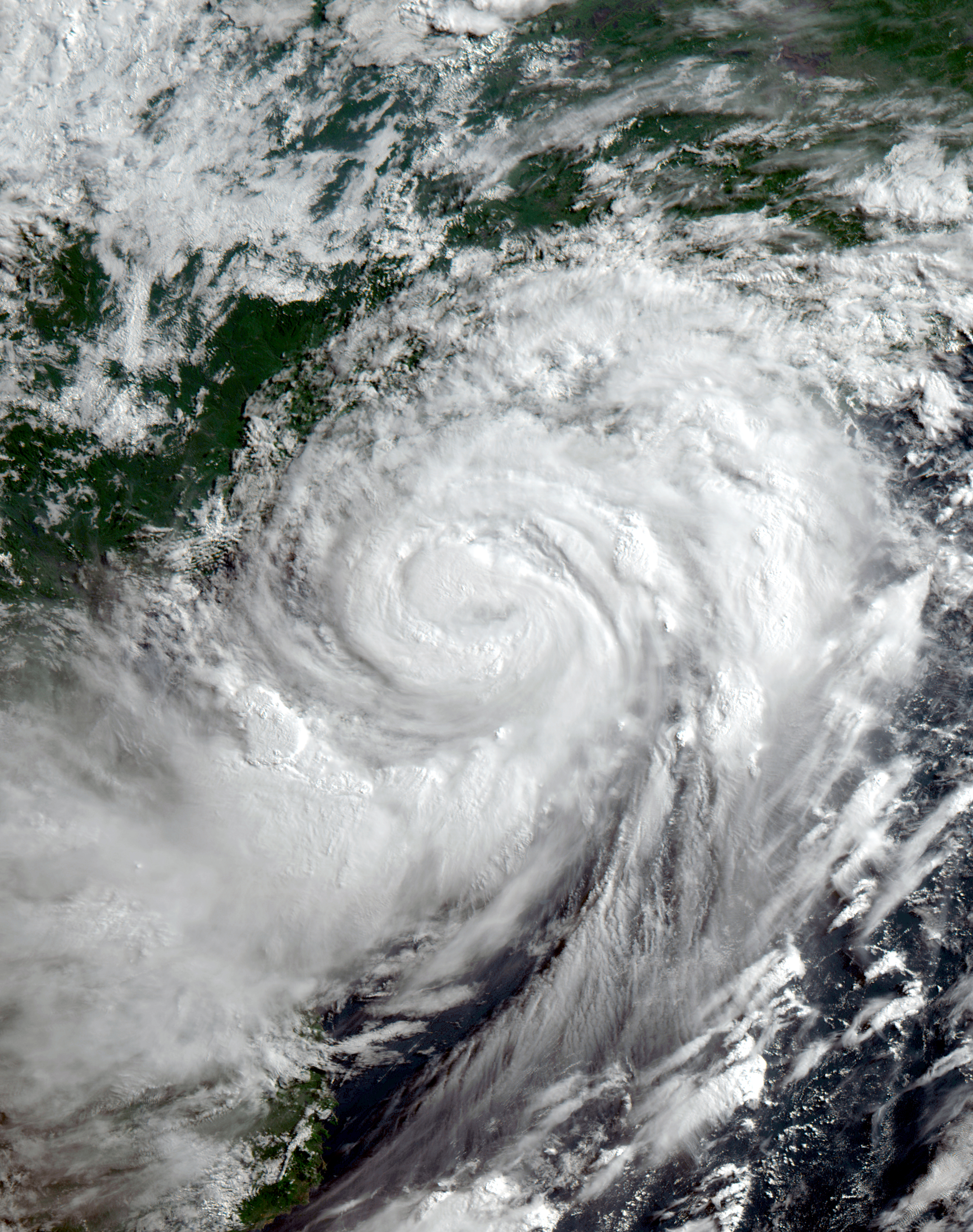
- Typhoon Chaba near peak intensity approaching Guangdong on July 2

Meteorological history
- Formed: June 28, 2022
- Extratropical: July 5, 2022
- Dissipated: July 7, 2022

Typhoon
- 10-minute sustained (JMA)
- Highest winds: 130 km/h (80 mph)
- Lowest pressure: 965 hPa (mbar); 28.50 inHg

Category 1-equivalent typhoon
- 1-minute sustained (SSHWS/JTWC)
- Highest winds: 140 km/h (85 mph)
- Lowest pressure: 967 hPa (mbar); 28.56 inHg

Overall effects
- Casualties: 27 dead, 2 missing
- Damage: $467 million (2022 USD)
- Areas affected: Philippines, China
- Part of the 2022 Pacific typhoon season

Typhoon Chaba, (Note: The name Chaba (Thai: ชบา, [t͡ɕʰa˦˥ baː˧]) was contributed by Thailand and refers to the Chinese hibiscus (Hibiscus rosa-sinensis) in Thai.) known in the Philippines as Tropical Depression Caloy, was a moderately strong tropical cyclone that impacted China in early July 2022. The third named storm and the second typhoon of the annual typhoon season, Chaba developed as a low-pressure area in the South China Sea on June 28, and soon became a tropical depression while moving northwestward.

The system intensified to Tropical Storm Chaba on June 30 and continued its northwest movement. Chaba continued to intensity under favourable condition. Early on July 2, Chaba attained typhoon status and made landfall in Guangdong a few hours later. Chaba dropped below typhoon status shortly after landfall, and weakened to a tropical depression on the next day and turned to the northeast. Chaba became extratropical on July 5 while over Anhui. The extratropical remnants of Chaba continued to move northeastward, emerged into Bohai Sea on July 6 and dissipated just off the Korean Peninsula on the next day.

In its early stage, Chaba enhanced the southwest monsoon and brought some rainfall to the Philippines. Chaba later sank a crane vessel Fu Jing 001 offshore Yangjiang, and caused 25 dead with 1 missing. After Chaba made landfall in Guangdong, its slow movement brought heavy rains and caused flooding in portions of China, with many places recorded heavy rainfall. 2 people were killed in Hainan, another person was missing in Guangxi, and the total damage amounted to ¥3.12 billion (US$466 million).

== Meteorological history ==
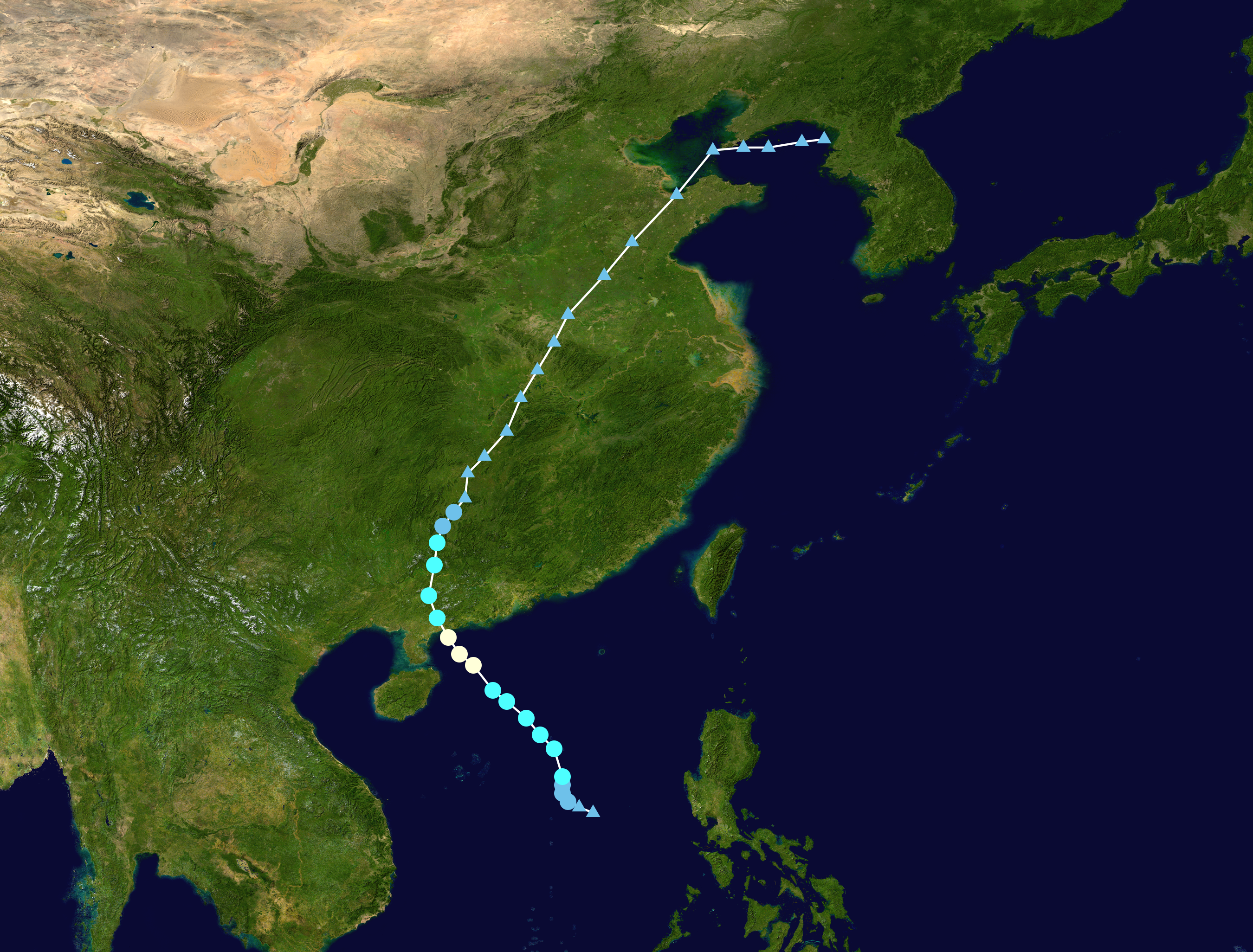
Map plotting the storm's track and intensity, according to the Saffir–Simpson scale Map key Saffir–Simpson scale Tropical depression (≤38 mph, ≤62 km/h) Tropical storm (39–73 mph, 63–118 km/h) Category 1 (74–95 mph, 119–153 km/h) Category 2 (96–110 mph, 154–177 km/h) Category 3 (111–129 mph, 178–208 km/h) Category 4 (130–156 mph, 209–251 km/h) Category 5 (≥157 mph, ≥252 km/h) Unknown Storm type Tropical cyclone Subtropical cyclone Extratropical cyclone, remnant low, tropical disturbance, or monsoon depression

On June 28, the Japan Meteorological Agency (JMA) began monitoring a low-pressure area over the South China Sea. The agency soon upgraded the system to a tropical depression. The same day, the Philippine Atmospheric, Geophysical and Astronomical Services Administration (PAGASA) followed suit and assigned the local name Caloy. The following day, the Joint Typhoon Warning Center (JTWC) issued a Tropical Cyclone Formation Alert (TCFA) to the system. The depression move slowly to the northwest, and exited the Philippine Area of Responsibility (PAR). The JTWC upgraded the system to a tropical depression later that day, as convection was developing over the southern part of the depression, and scatterometer revealed a well-defined center. At 00:00 UTC June 30, the JMA upgraded it to a tropical storm and assigned the name Chaba. Three hours later, the JTWC also upgraded it to a tropical storm. Chaba gradually intensified while moving north-northwestward under warm sea surface temperature of 30 °C (86 °F) and low to moderate wind shear. Chaba intensified further to a severe tropical storm later that day while located to the northeast of the Paracel Islands. On July 1, Chaba steered by a subtropical ridge over the northern Philippines and turned northwestward while continued to intensity under favourable condition. At 21:00 UTC, the JTWC upgraded Chaba to a typhoon. The JMA followed suit three hours later.

According to the JTWC, Chaba attained peak 1-minute sustained winds of 85 mph (140 km/h) at 03:00 UTC July 2, equivalent to a Category 1 on the Saffir–Simpson scale. Three hours later, the JMA reported that Chaba attained peak intensity with 10-minute sustained winds of 80 mph (130 km/h) and a barometric pressure of 965 hPa (28.50 inHg). Maintaining its peak intensity, Chaba made landfall in Maoming, Guangdong at 15:00 CST (07:00 UTC). Weakening took place immediately after landfall due to land interaction, the JMA soon downgraded Chaba to a severe tropical storm. The JTWC downgraded Chaba to a tropical storm and issued its final warning at 15:00 UTC. Three hours later, the JMA downgraded Chaba to a tropical storm. The following day, Chaba further weakened to a tropical depression while located over Guangxi. Chaba turned northward and then northeastward across China. The system became extratropica on July 5 while over Anhui. The extratropical remnants of Chaba continued to move northeastward, emerged into the Bohai Sea on the following day, and dissipated on July 7 while located just off the coast of North Korea.

== Preparations and impact ==
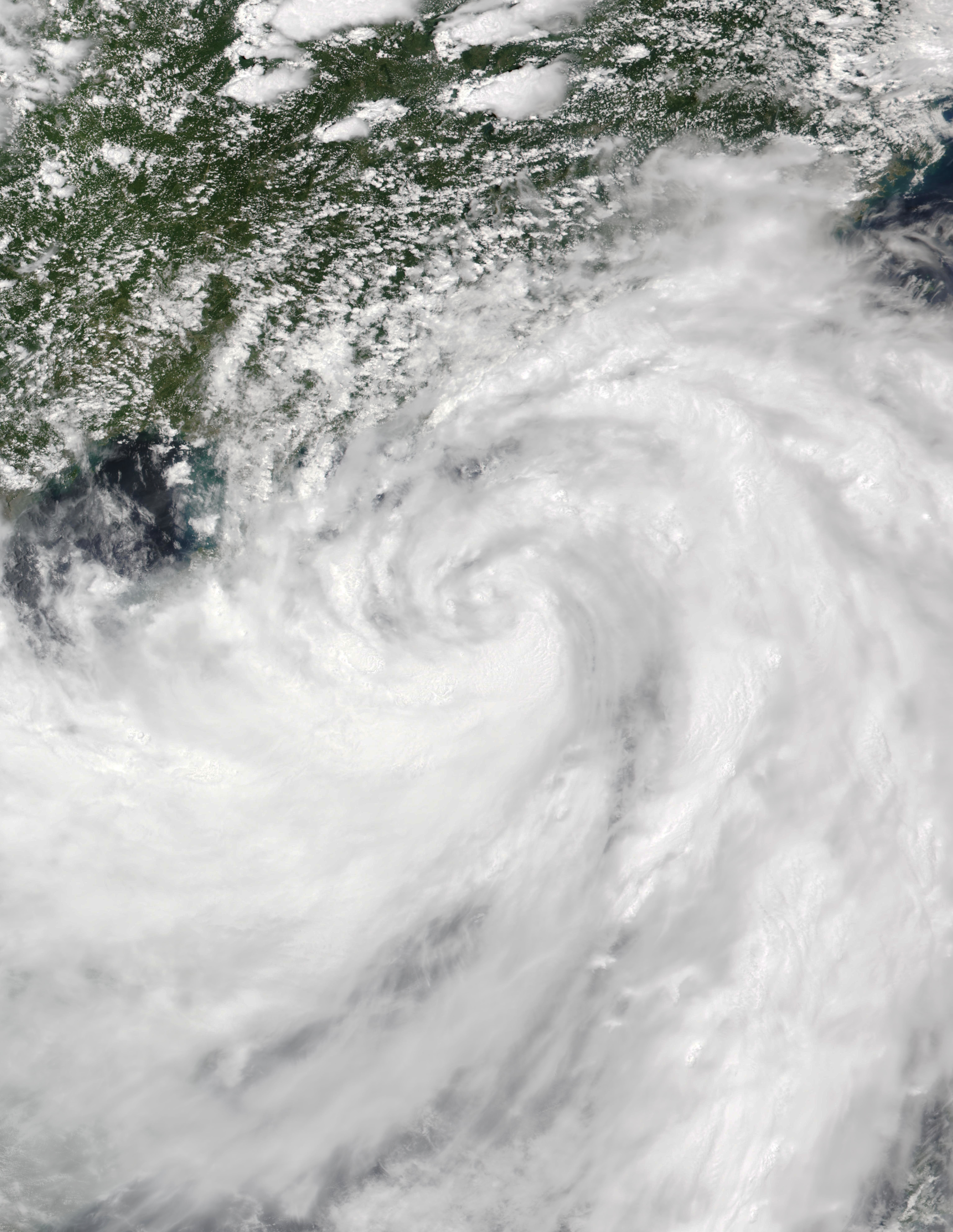
Tropical Storm Chaba intensifying over the South China Sea on July 1

=== Philippines ===
Although Chaba did not directly impacted the country, it enhanced the southwest monsoon (known locally as habagat) and brought rainfall to Luzon and Western Visayas. Many places recorded a cumulative rainfall of over 50 mm (2.0 in) on June 28 and 29. Baler recorded 182.3 mm (7.18 in), the highest cumulative rainfall across the country. Tayabas and Casiguran recorded 119 mm (4.7 in) and 100.8 mm (3.97 in) respectively.

=== China ===
The National Meteorological Center (NMC) issued an Orange typhoon alert on July 1, and its parent agency China Meteorological Administration (CMA) issued a Level III emergency response to floods and typhoon.

In Hainan, the provincial meteorological service issued a Level III emergency response to floods and typhoon on July 1, and warned that heavy rains could slash the island. Later that day, the emergency level was raised to level II. Railway services were suspended, and more than 400 flights were cancelled due to the typhoon. Haikou Xiuying Port, Haikou Port New Seaport and South Port in Haikou were closed. Despite remaining offshore, Chaba still brought heavy rains to the island. Many places recorded 300 mm (12 in) rainfall. The highest rainfall in the province reached 581.4 mm (22.89 in), recorded in Wangxia, Changjiang County. Sanya recorded 421.6 mm (16.60 in) rainfall within 24 hours, which broke the record of highest rainfall in 24 hours, though it was broken again a year later by Talim. The entire Hainan island recorded winds of at least gale-force. The highest gust was 91 mph (147 km/h), recorded in Qizhou Islands. Chaba killed 2 people in the province, and the economic loss was ¥183 million (US$27.3 million).

In Guangdong, the provincial meteorological service issued a Level IV emergency response to floods and typhoon on June 30. The emergency level subsequently raised to level III and then level II as Chaba approached. 77,900 people were moved to safe places in advance of the typhoon. Train services were suspended. Heavy rains were hitting the province, and the rainfall of the northern region were expected to reached 100–140 mm (3.9–5.5 in). The insurance company received 13,336 claims after the typhoon stroke the province, and the damage was calculated at ¥556 million (US$83 million).

In Yulin, Guangxi, the heavy rainfall from Chaba triggered flooding. Being just recovered from the heavy rains in June, which posed a great threat to the city. In Beiliu, a house was damaged by landslides, but no casualties were reported. In Rong County, one person went missing after a landslide hit the county. About 3,782.33 ha (9,346.3 acres) of crops were destroyed, and the direct economic loss was ¥77.5 million (US$11.6 million).

Despite weakened significantly before moving into Hunan, Chaba still brought heavy rainfall and caused flooding to the province. Floodwaters reached the first floor of a school in Yiyang and 10 teachers were trapped. They were rescued and transferred into safe places. The floodwaters broke down many vehicles, people on the vehicles needed firefighters to rescue them. In Yueyang County, floodwaters trapped 12 people and they were rescued by firefighters later.

Chaba also brought heavy rainfall in Jiangxi. Longnan recorded the highest average rainfall across the province, reached 116.2 mm (4.57 in). Dingnan County and Quannan County recorded the average rainfall of 100.2 mm (3.94 in) and 84.9 mm (3.34 in) respectively. About 273 ha (670 acres) of crops were destroyed. A house were severely damaged, and the direct economic loss was ¥12.5 million (US$1.87 million). In all, 1.86 million people were affected by the typhoon. More than 670 houses were destroyed, and 1,400 others were damaged. About 109,010 ha (269,400 acres) of crops were destroyed, and the total damage across the country amounted to ¥3.12 billion (US$466 million).

==== Fu Jing 001 accident ====
On July 2, the crane vessel Fu Jing 001 broke into two parts and sank at about 190 mi (300 km) southwest of Hong Kong due to adverse weather brought by Chaba. Winds of up to 68 mph (110 km/h) and big waves battered the crane vessel. The Government Flying Service from Hong Kong participated in the rescue mission. The team rescued four crew members, but 12 were confirmed dead, with 14 others were missing. By July 29, 25 crew members were confirmed dead, with 1 was still missing. A year later, a report from the China MSA revealed that the crane vessel falsely reported the number of people on board, and continued the operation at an offshore wind farms in Yangjiang. The anchor was broken and the crans vessel sank later. The operator also rejected the help from the rescuers, and this was believed to be the major reason of the accident.

=== Hong Kong ===
The Hong Kong Observatory (HKO) issued the typhoon signal no. 8 at 19:10 HKT (11:10 UTC) July 1, the first time of the annual typhoon season. Many public transports were suspended shortly afterwards due to adverse weather. The signal was lowered to no. 3 at 16:20 HKT (08:20 UTC) July 2, as Chaba made landfall and weakened. Chaba became the first tropical cyclone that caused the HKO to issue a typhoon signal no. 8 or above on the establishment day. Typhoon signal no. 8 was issued for 21 hours and 10 minutes, it was the ninth longest signal no. 8 in history. Many places recorded gale-force winds, which was winds of 39 mph (63 km/h) or above. Cheung Chau and Waglan Island recorded sustained winds of 55 mph (89 km/h) and 48 mph (78 km/h) respectively. The typhoon injured three people and caused a flooding event. Strong winds downed trees in the territory. 88 people were moved to temporary shelters in advance of Chaba. Public transport were disrupted, with three flights were rerouted to Taiwan. The direct economic loss was estimated to be HK$11.4 million (US$1.45 million).

=== Macau ===
The Meteorological and Geophysical Bureau (SMG) hoisted the typhoon signal no. 8 at 21:30 MST (13:30 UTC) July 1. The SMG also issued a yellow storm surge warning and warned potential storm surge over the low-lying areas. The signal was lowered to no. 3 at 20:30 MST (12:30 UTC) July 2, as Chaba made landfall and moved away from Macau. Flooding occurred in the Inner Harbour area and Coloane. The Amizade Bridge recorded sustained winds of 59 mph (95 km/h) and a gust of 76 mph (123 km/h). Chaba also caused a storm surge of 0.5 m (1.6 ft) in the Inner Harbour area. Two people were injured during the typhoon, though overall impact was relatively minor.

== See also ==
- Tropical cyclones in 2022
- List of storms named Chaba
- List of storms named Caloy
- Typhoon Chanthu (2010)
- Tropical Storm Rumbia (2013)
- Typhoon Rammasun
- Typhoon Mujigae
- Tropical Storm Wipha (2019)
- Tropical Storm Nuri (2020)
