= Sihna Lawrence =

Micronesian civil servant

Sihna Neth Lawrence

Secretary of Finance of Micronesia
- In office 16 July 2015 – 11 May 2019
- Preceded by: Kensley Ikosia
- Succeeded by: Eugene Amor

Sihna Lawrence is a Micronesian civil servant and former secretary of finance of the Federated States of Micronesia from July 2015 to May 2019.

Lawrence worked from 1978 to 1980 in Pohnpei State government in its department of finance. Then she worked from 1980 to 2000 in the Department of Finance of FSM government. She then left for private sector as CFO of FSM Development Bank from 2000 to 2015.

Lawrence was appointed and confirmed as secretary of finance to the Department of Finance and Administration on 16 July 2015. She was succeeded by Eugene Amor in 2019.

Currently she is the chairwoman of the board of FSM Development Bank.
