= Elina P. Akinaga =

Micronesia's Department of Resource & Development's Secretary

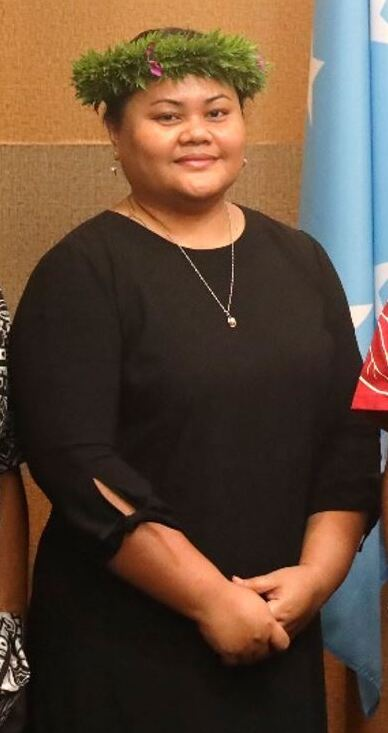
- Akinaga in 2021
- Incumbent
- Assumed office September 13, 2023
- President: Wesley Simina
- Preceded by: Marion Henry

Secretary of the Department of Resource & Development

Elina P. Akinaga is a Federated States of Micronesia Secretary in Micronesia's cabinet. She is the Secretary of the Department of Resources and Development.

== Life ==
On 11 May 2023, Wesley Simina was elected president of the Federated States of Micronesia during the first regular session of the 23rd Congress. He is supported by an elected vice-President and cabinet who are chosen by the President and ratified by congress. His choices included Gardenia Aisek and Rose Nakanaga and Akinaga was an acting secretary. Some who were chosen as cabinet members were not immediately endorsed but Akinaga became the Secretary of the Department of Resources and Development.

Akinaga was still in the cabinet in 2024 when she organised an Expo in July that was supported by the Chinese ambassador.

Blue Prosperity Micronesia is a partnership between Micronesia and a coalition to manage the country's marine resources. Akinaga advocates the plan and she has led public consultations on a supporting Marine Spatial Planning Bill.
