= Secretary of Justice (Micronesia) =

The Department of Justice of Micronesia (Attorney General's Office) provides legal advice to the President, Executive Branch, and national government. It represents the national government in court, administrative hearings, and legal negotiations.

In addition, the department has four divisions that oversee the nation's welfare and security. Under the Office of the Secretary, the Divisions of Litigation and Law undertake prosecutions, legislative drafting and reviews, and promulgation of regulations. The remaining divisions enforce the laws of the nation and its security.

== List of secretaries (1998-present) ==
- Emilio Musrasrik (1998-2000)
- Paul E. McIlrath (2000-2004)
- Marstella Jack (2005-2007) [1st female]
- Maketo Robert (2008-2012)
- April Dawn Skilling (2012-2015)
- Joses R. Gallen (2015–present)

== See also ==
- Justice ministry
- Politics of the Federated States of Micronesia
