= Eugene Amor =

Micronesian politician

Eugene N. Amor

Secretary of Finance of Micronesia
- In office December 2019 – 19 September 2023
- Preceded by: Sihna Lawrence
- Succeeded by: Rose Nakanaga

Personal details
- Education: United States Naval Academy

Eugene Amor is a Micronesian civil servant and the former Secretary of Finance of Micronesia from 2019 to 2023.

He graduated from Xavier High School in Weno, Chuuk. He attended the United States Naval Academy in Annapolis Maryland, and graduated with a Bachelor of Science degree in economics. He also completed courses in the University of Pittsburgh.

Amor served in various capacities in the FSM Government, including as manager at the tax administration division and assistant secretary of finance for budget and economic management in the Department of Finance. He also worked in the International Monetary Fund in Washington D.C., as economic advisor to the executive director from Asia Pacific Region.

Amor was confirmed as Secretary of Finance in 2019 and was replaced in the post by Rose Nakanaga on 19 September 2023.
