= Reed Oliver =

Governor of Pohnpei State, Micronesia

The Honorable Reed B. Oliver
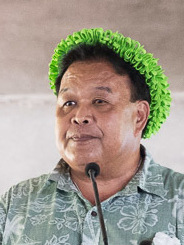
- Reed Oliver in 2020

Governor of Pohnpei
- Incumbent
- Assumed office 13 January 2020
- Preceded by: Marcelo Peterson

Personal details
- Born: 24 June 1958 (age 68)
- Spouse: Estle Semes Gallen Oliver
- Children: 8 (five sons, three daughters)

Reed B. Oliver (born 24 June 1958) is the former governor of Pohnpei State, Micronesia from 13 January 2020 till 13 January 2024.

Preceded by Marcelo Peterson	Governor of Pohnpei; 2020	Succeeded by
