= John Ehsa =

Micronesian politician (1958–2022)

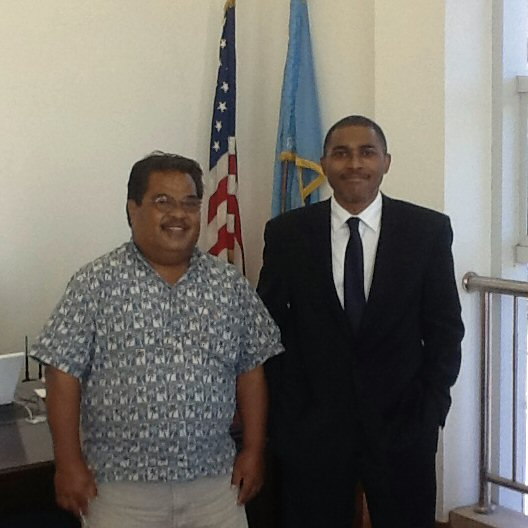
- Ehsa on left

Governor of Pohnpei
- In office 14 January 2008 – October 2015
- Lieutenant: Churchill B. Edward (2008-2012); Marcelo Peterson (2012-2015)
- Preceded by: Johnny P. David
- Succeeded by: Marcelo Peterson

Personal details
- Born: 20 August 1958 Madolenihmw, Pohnpei
- Died: January 2022 (aged 63)
- Spouse: Julinida Weital
- Children: Five sons and five daughters
- Education: Xavier High School

John Ehsa (20 August 1958 – January 2022) was a Micronesian politician. Ehsa served as the Governor of Pohnpei, one of the four states that constitute the Federated States of Micronesia, from 14 January 2008 until his resignation in October 2015.

Ehsa was born on 20 August 1958, in Madolenihmw, Pohnpei. He graduated from Xavier High School, a Jesuit secondary school located on Chuuk, in 1975.

Ehsa worked as the Secretary of Finance from June 1996 to August 2003. He then served as the executive director of the Federated States of Micronesia Joint Committee on Compact Economic Negotiations (JCN) with the United States from September 2003 until August 2004. Ehsa also worked as the Director of Administration for the Congress of the Federated States of Micronesia from August 2004 to August 2006.

Ehsa took office of the Governor of Pohnpei in January 2008, was re-elected for another term in 2013, and held the governorship until his resignation in October 2015.
