= List of storms named Francisco =

The name Francisco has been used to name seven tropical cyclones worldwide: six in the West Pacific Ocean, including one in the Philippine Area of Responsibility, and one in the South-West Indian Ocean. The name Francisco, contributed by the United States, is a male given name in the Chamorro language.

In the West Pacific:

- Typhoon Francisco (2001) (T0118, 22W) – a strong typhoon that never impacted land.
- Tropical Storm Francisco (2007) (T0713, 15W) – a minimal tropical storm that struck southern China.
- Typhoon Francisco (2013) (T1327, 26W, Urduja) – became the 4th super typhoon of the season, which steered well away from Japan.
- Typhoon Francisco (2019) (T1908, 09W) – strengthened into a typhoon before making landfall over Japan and Korea.
- Tropical Storm Francisco (2025) (T2507, 10W, Dante) – minimal tropical storm that passed through the Ryukyu Islands before making landfall in China.

The name Francisco also appears on PAGASA's typhoon name list, being first used in the 2026 season; it replaced Florita which was retired after the 2022 season.

- Typhoon Mekkhala (2026) (T2607, 07W, Francisco) – a strong typhoon that recurved to Japan after affecting the Philippines and Taiwan

Preceded by Ester	Pacific typhoon season names (Philippines); Francisco	Succeeded by Gardo

In the South-West Indian:

- Tropical Storm Francisco (2020) – a minimal tropical storm which affected Madagascar.

== See also ==
Storms with similar names

- Storm Francis (2020) – a European windstorm that affected the United Kingdom, Ireland, Belgium, and the Netherlands.
- Storm Francis (2025) – a European windstorm that affected Southern Europe.
