= List of storms named Domeng =

The name Domeng has been used for six tropical cyclones in the Philippine Area of Responsibility by PAGASA in the West Pacific Ocean. It replaced the name Dagul following the 2002 Pacific typhoon season.

- Tropical Storm Jelawat (2006) (T0602, 03W, Domeng) – struck China
- Tropical Storm Domeng (2010) (Domeng) – passed through the Babuyan Islands
- Tropical Storm Peipah (2014) (T1404, 05W, Domeng) – remained in the open ocean
- Severe Tropical Storm Maliksi (2018) (T1805, 06W, Domeng) – did not make landfall but brought rains at the Philippines and Japan.
- Tropical Storm Aere (2022) (T2204, 04W, Domeng) – made landfall over Okinawa; later transitioned into a subtropical storm
- Severe Tropical Storm Jangmi (2026) (T2606, 06W, Domeng) – affected the Ryukyu Islands before transitioning into an extratropical cyclone.

Preceded by Caloy	Pacific typhoon season names Domeng	Succeeded by Ester
