= Margaret Keita =

Gambian politician

Secretary of State for Finance and Economic Affairs
- In office 10 March 2005 – 14 June 2005
- Preceded by: Musa Gibril Bala Gaye
- Succeeded by: Alieu N’gum

Margaret Keita is a Gambian politician. She was Secretary of State for Finance and Economic Affairs in the West African state of Gambia.

== Biography ==
She began working in the civil service in 1980 and was appointed Accountant General in 1991. From 1994 she was Deputy Chief Accountant and took over the office of Chief Accountant in 1996. She was sworn in by President Yahya Jammeh on 10 March 2005, succeeding Musa Gibril Bala Gaye, who took over as Minister of Foreign Affairs.

After only three months in office, she was replaced on 14 June by Alieu N’gum, who had previously been head of the civil service, as part of an anti-corruption campaign.

After her ministerial post, she worked as Director of Finance & Administration at the West African Monetary Institute (WAMI).

== See also ==
- List of female finance ministers
