= List of storms named Ester =

The name Ester has been used for six tropical cyclones in the Philippine Area of Responsibility by PAGASA in the Western Pacific Ocean. It replaced the name Espada following the 2002 Pacific typhoon season.

- Typhoon Ewiniar (2006) (T0603, 04W, Ester) – a deadly typhoon that stuck the Korean Peninsula.
- Severe Tropical Storm Dianmu (2010) (T1004, 05W, Ester) – a severe tropical storm at traversed through South Korea.
- Tropical Storm Mitag (2014) (T1407, Ester) – only recognized by PAGASA and JMA as a tropical storm, and by JTWC as a subtropical storm.
- Tropical Storm Gaemi (2018) (T1806, 08W, Ester) – struck Taiwan as a tropical storm.
- Tropical Storm Trases (2022) (T2206, 07W, Ester) – affected South Korea as a weakening tropical depression.
- Tropical Depression Ester (2026) – a tropical depression that affected Philippines and Taiwan.

Preceded by Domeng	Pacific typhoon season names Ester	Succeeded by Francisco
