= Robert Ruecho =

Micronesian politician (born 1946)

4th Governor of Yap
- In office January 13, 2003 – January 8, 2007
- Lieutenant: Joseph Habuchimai
- Preceded by: Vincent A. Figir
- Succeeded by: Sebastian Anefal

Personal details
- Born: January 1, 1946 (age 80) Yap, FSM
- Spouse: Serly Sivas Ruecho
- Children: 2
- Education: University of Guam

Robert Ruecho is a Micronesian politician and diplomat. Ruecho served as the Governor of Yap, one of the four states which make up the Federated States of Micronesia (FSM), from 2003 to 2007. He became the Consul-General for FSM on neighboring Guam on October 17, 2011.

Robert Ruecho was elected Governor of Yap in the 2002 gubernatorial election and took office in 2003. His running mate in 2002 was Joseph Habuchimai, who became Yap's lieutenant governor. Ruecho was defeated for re-election by Sebastian Anefal in 2006.

Ruecho moved to Guam in 2008. He served on the Advisory on Micronesian Affairs for former Guam Governor Felix Camacho.

Micronesian President Manny Mori nominated Ruecho as FSM's Consul-General to Guam in July 2011. He was chosen to replace outgoing, longtime consul-general, Gerson Jackson. Ruecho was confirmed by the FSM Congress in August 2011.

Ruecho sworn into office at 11:30 p.m. on October 17, 2011, at the International Trade Center in Guam by President Manny Mori. President Mori was on an official visit to Guam at the time to meet with members of the Micronesian migrant community. Ruecho's challenges include increased tensions between Guamanians and the Micronesian community over recent gang related crime on the island.
