= Department of Finance and Administration (Micronesia) =

Agency overview
- Formed: 1979
- Jurisdiction: Micronesia
- Headquarters: Palikir
- Agency executive: Rose Nakanaga, Secretary
- Parent agency: Government of the Federated States of Micronesia
- Website: dofa.gov.fm

Department of Finance and Administration of the Federated States of Micronesia is a government department in the Micronesia responsible for effective management of public financial assets, strengthening tax collection, maximizing investments and maintaining border control of Micronesia.

== Secretaries of Finance and Administration ==
Name	Took office	Left office	
Aloysius Tuuth	1979	1989	
Ihlen Joseph	1989	1991	acting
Aloysius Tuuth	1991	1995	
Patrick Mackenzie	1995	?	
John Ehsa	1996	2003	
Nick L. Andon	2003	2007	
Finley Perman	2007	2011	
Rose Nakanaga	2011	2012	acting
Kensley Ikosia	2012	2015	
Sihna N. Lawrence	2015	2019	
Eugene Amor	2019	2023	
Rose Nakanaga	2023	Incumbent	

== See also ==
- Government of the Federated States of Micronesia
- Economy of the Federated States of Micronesia
