= Sebastian Anefal =

Micronesian politician

Ambassador to Fiji
- Incumbent
- Assumed office January 8, 2016

5th Governor of Yap
- In office January 8, 2007 – January 12, 2015
- Lieutenant: Tony Tareg
- Preceded by: Robert Ruecho
- Succeeded by: Tony Ganngiyan

Secretary of Foreign Affairs
- In office 2003–2007

Personal details
- Born: January 21, 1952 (age 74) Guror, Gilman, State of Yap, Trust Territory of the Pacific Islands
- Spouse: Marita Phillip
- Children: Three daughters & two sons
- Education: Eastern Oregon State University

Sebastian L. Anefal (born January 21, 1952, in Guror, Gilman municipality, Yap, Trust Territory of the Pacific Islands) is a Micronesian politician currently serving as the FSM Ambassador Plenipotentiary to Fiji. He was nominated by President Peter M. Christian to his current post in mid-2015 and took office on January 8, 2016.

He became the secretary of foreign affairs of the Federated States of Micronesia on September 5, 2003, when his nomination was approved by Congress. Through foreign ministry work, he gained experiences in international politics and has addressed the United Nations General Assembly on some occasions where Micronesia was concerned. Anefal also worked extensively with other world leaders to provide foreign aid to Micronesia for infrastructure projects and programs. He was the secretary of the department of resources and economic affairs prior to his appointment as foreign minister of FSM in 2002. He served as foreign minister of the Federated States of Micronesia until December 2006.

On January 8, 2007, he was inaugurated as the fifth governor of his home state of Yap, a position he held for two terms.

Anefal ran unopposed for a second term in the Yapese gubernatorial election held on November 2, 2010. The combined ticket of Gov. Sebastian Anefal and Lt. Gov. Tony Tareg received 3,519 votes in the election. Anefal was sworn into his second, four-year term in office on January 10, 2011.
