= Lawrence Stephen =

Nauruan politician

The Honourable Lawrence Stephen MP

Member of the Nauruan Parliament for Anetan
- In office February 25, 1971 – November 12, 1977
- Preceded by: Paul Asa Diema
- Succeeded by: Bucky Ika
- In office December 8, 1980 – December 8, 1986
- Preceded by: Roy Degoregore
- Succeeded by: Ruby Dediya
- In office November 16, 1992 – November 26, 1995
- Preceded by: Ruby Dediya
- Succeeded by: Ruby Dediya

Personal details
- Died: 22 March 2006
- Children: Marcus Stephen

Lawrence Stephen (died 22 March 2006) was a political figure from the Pacific nation of Nauru.

== Political role ==
Lawrence Stephen served as a Member of the Parliament of Nauru from 1971 to 1977, again from 1980 to 1986, and for a third time from 1992 to 1995.

== Role in sport ==
He was involved for many years with the Nauru National Olympic Committee, and served as its General Secretary.

=== Family ===
Stephen was a member of the Eamwit tribe. One of Nauru's aspiring sportsmen during this period was his son Marcus Stephen who became a champion weightlifter, before embarking on a political career. He became President of Nauru in 2007.

== Death ==
Stephen died on 22 March 2006.

== See also ==
- Politics of Nauru
- Political families of the world#Nauru
