= Jesse Salalu =

Micronesian politician

Jesse John Salalu

8th Governor of Yap
- In office December 29, 2021 – January 9, 2023
- Lieutenant Governor: Vacant
- Preceded by: Henry Falan
- Succeeded by: Charles Chieng

Lieutenant Governor of Yap
- In office January 14, 2014 – December 29, 2021
- Preceded by: James Yangetmai

Personal details
- Born: Fais Island
- Spouse: Rosa Halchiyey
- Education: University of Guam (BA, MEd)

Jesse John Salalu is a Micronesian politician who served as the eighth Governor of Yap from December 29, 2021, to January 9, 2023. Salalu was sworn into office following Henry Falan being ousted by the Yap legislature. He previously served as lieutenant Governor of Yap under Falan from January 2019 to December 2021. He was the first Governor of Yap to be born on the outer islands, which meant his lieutenant governor had to have been born on the main island of Yap.

Prior to running for public office, Salalu served as a teacher, high school principal, and regional administrator for the Neighboring Islands at the Yap State Department of Education. Salalu serves on the College of Micronesia Board of Regents, where he is the vice-chairman.

== 2018 gubernatorial election ==
In 2018, Jesse J. Salalu ran for Lieutenant Governor alongside Henry Falan running for Governor. They won against the incumbent Governor Tony Ganngiyan and Lieutenant Governor Francis I. Itimai with 51.7% of the vote.

== Controversies ==
On March 21, 2022, 40 doctors and nurses resigned from the state hospital after Salalu's administration refused to listen to requests to raise wages. Prior to the resignation, members of the Yap medical community sent a request to the Office of the Governor for an opportunity to voice their grievances regarding their working conditions at the Yap Memorial Hospital in Colonia.

Their grievances include: understaffing, low salaries, which led to an inability to keep qualified doctors, temporary contracts setup by the Falan government expiring, and the Yap legislature not approving the JEMCO (US-FSM Joint Economic Management Committee) grant that was meant for wage increases for those working at the hospital.

After Salalu declined to meet with the doctors and nurses, they turned in their letters of resignation to the Office on March 29. On March 31, Salalu subsequently declared a state of emergency.
