= Marstella Jack =

Micronesian lawyer

Attorney General of Micronesia
- In office 20 May 2005 – 13 February 2008
- Preceded by: Paul E. McIlrath
- Succeeded by: Maketo Robert

Personal details
- Education: University of the South Pacific

Marstella Jack is a Micronesian lawyer and activist. She served as the first woman Attorney General of Micronesia between 2005 and 2007.

== Career ==
Jack is from Mokil Atoll in the Pohnpei State of Federated States of Micronesia. She become the second national to get a degree in law from the University of the South Pacific, and later got a master's degree from the University of Hull.

She has worked as lawyer for more than fifteen years, as government attorney and also an environmental and feminism activist. After working for seven years in the Foreign Service of the Federated States of Micronesia, where served as head of the Division for Information and Research, Jack served as Assistant Attorney General at the national Department of Justice and, subsequently, as Assistant Attorney General for the Government of the State of Pohnpei. On 3 June 2005 she was appointed the first woman Attorney General of Micronesia. The Congress of the Federated States of Micronesia confirmed her nomination on 20 May 2005. Jack was succeeded by Maketo Robert on 13 February 2008.

In November 2022 Jack became chairwoman of the Pacific Islands Association of Non-Governmental Organisation. She has also been member of the Federated States of Micronesia (FSM) Alliance of NGOs (FANGO).
