= Gardenia Aisek =

Microneasian educator

Honorable Gardenia Aisek
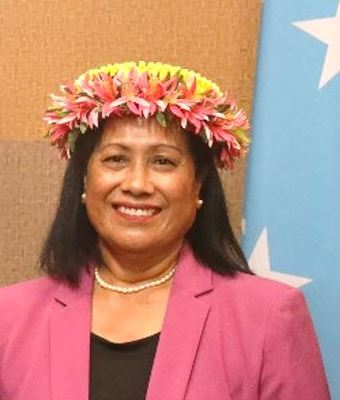
- Aisek in 2021

Secretary of the Department of Education (Federated States of Micronesia)
- Incumbent
- Assumed office October 2021
- President: David Panuelo
- Preceded by: Kalwin Kephas

Personal details
- Education: National University (California)

Gardenia Aisek (former surnames Walter and Macayaon) is a Microneasian educator and government official. Aisek served as a senator in the Chuuk State Legislature. She then became the first female Secretary of the Federated States of Micronesia Department of Education.

== Background ==
Aisek has a Master of Business Administration degree from National University (California). She has taught at the College of Micronesia and the Northern Marianas College. While at Northern Marianas College, she became the Director of the School of Business and Hospitality.

From 1997 to 2005, Aisek was the First Lady of Chuuk State when her then-husband Ansito Walter was Governor. During this period, Aisek was the first woman to be a member of the Board of Regents for the College of Micronesia. Aisek also helped her brother run their family business, the Blue Lagoon Resort, which is located near the Kimiuo Aisek Memorial Museum named after their father.

== Government career ==
Aisek became the first female Director of the Chuuk State Department of Education, and retained the role from 2010 to 2014. During her tenure, she led an education reform effort until she was controversially fired by the Chuuk Board of Education. Aisek sued for wrongful termination.

In 2017, Aisek was elected to the Chuuk State Legislature, having won by a wide margin. While serving in the state senate, she was a delegate to the Association of Pacific Islands Legislatures. In 2021, Aisek was sworn in by President David Panuelo as the Secretary of the Federated States of Micronesia Department of Education together with Ausen Lambert, Marcus Samo and Elina Akinaga. Aisek helped secure a $17,700,000 investment from the World Bank in 2022 to improve the country’s education system and vocational training. In a statement, President Panuelo said, "Words cannot express how proud I am of Secretary Aisek and her team at the Department of Education, and how thankful we are for the World Bank’s financial support for this project."
