= Henry Falan =

Micronesian politician

Henry S. Falan
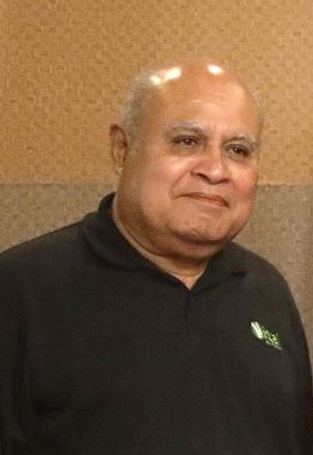

7th Governor of Yap
- In office January 14, 2019 – December 17, 2021
- Lieutenant Governor: Jesse Salalu
- Preceded by: Tony Ganngiyan
- Succeeded by: Jesse Salalu

Henry S. Falan is a Micronesian politician and the former Governor of Yap from January 19, 2019, to December 17, 2022. Falan was removed from his position as governor by the Yap state legislature. Jesse Salalu, his former Lieutenant Governor, took his place as Governor of Yap.

== Before governorship ==
Falan first served in Yap District Legislature in 1977. He later served as Director of Department of Education of Yap from 1996 to 2004. In 2007, Falan was elected to the Yap legislature, and he served as its speaker from 2011 to 2014.

== Impeachment ==
On September 16, 2021, Falan signed an executive order to close the Yap State Office of the Attorney General in response to the legislature not approving Falan's supplementary budget request needed to attract and retain qualified legal professionals to the office. On September 22, the attorney general's office was reopened by emergency declaration stating Ifalik island, following salt water flooding that destroyed the island's main source of food, required assistance from the government including the AG's office. The following day, the state legislature introduced a resolution with seven cosponsors to oust Falan from his position. This was the last in several attempts to remove him from office by his opponents in the 2018 election.

Henry Falan appeared before the Yap legislature on October 15, for an impeachment hearing. Marstella Jack, an attorney from Pohnpei, represented the Governor during the hearing. On October 19, the 10th Yap State Legislature failed to remove Falan from office for misfeasance and malfeasance with a vote of 7–3. Article V section 20 of the Yap State Constitution states, 75% or more of the legislature must vote to remove the Governor for the resolution to pass. Theodore Rutun, Nicholas Figirlaarwon, and Joseph B. Tiuchemal voted to keep Falan in office.

During the third legislative session, the legislature reintroduced the proposal to oust the Governor. After alleged pressure from members of the Legislature, Tiuchemal voted in favor of impeachment, and the proposal passed on December 16, with a vote of 8–2. Falan was removed from office the following day.

Following his removal from office, a petition was made and spread throughout the Federated States of Micronesia, Hawaii, the U.S. and Guam to Micronesians calling for the reinstatement of Falan as Governor. It amassed over 1,200 signatures and was delivered to the legislature on January 28, 2022.
