= Charles Chieng =

Governor of Yap State, Micronesia

Honorable Charles Chieng
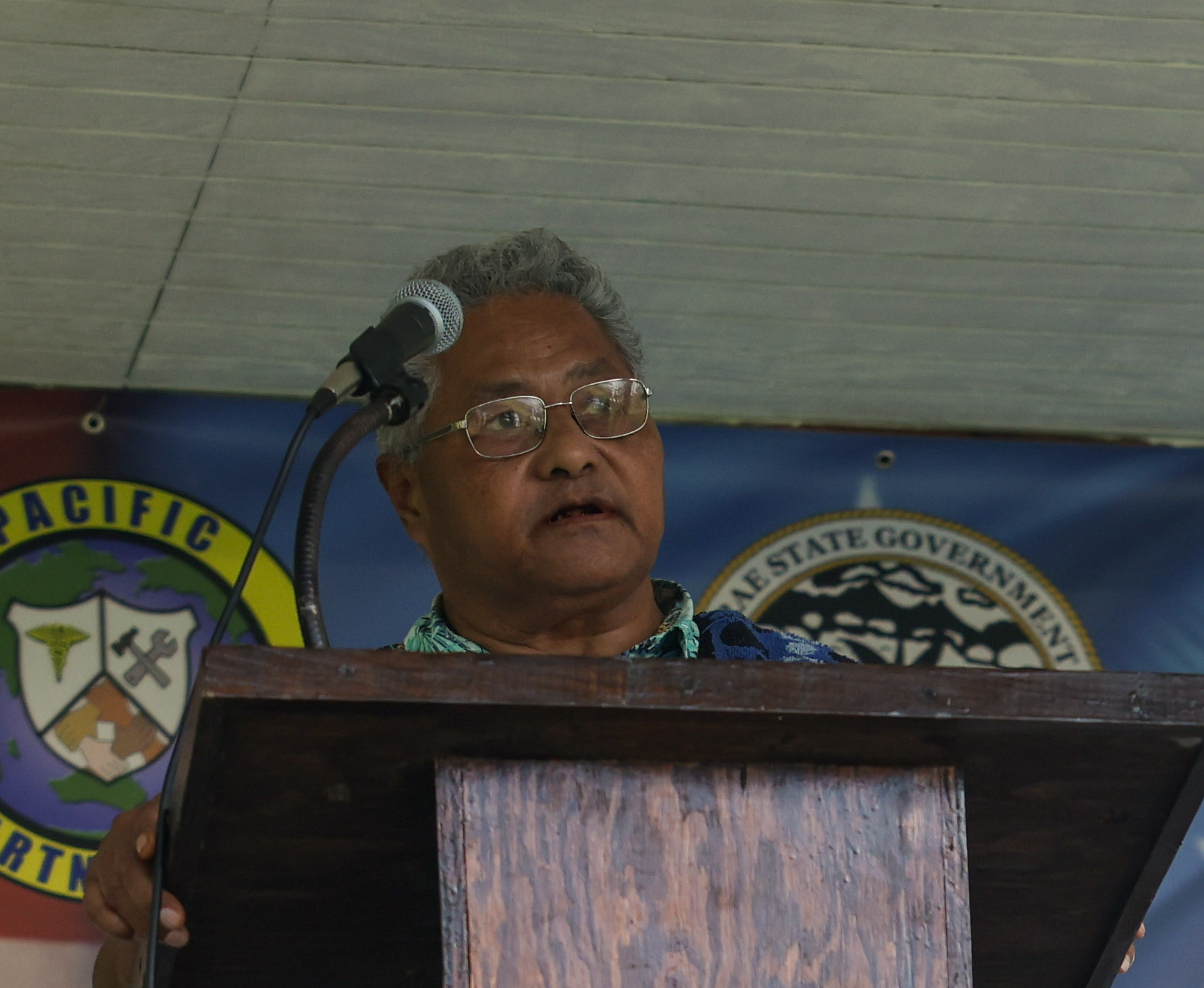
- Chieng in 2024

9th Governor of Yap
- In office 9 January 2023 – 28 May 2025
- Lieutenant: Francis Itimai
- Preceded by: Jesse Salalu
- Succeeded by: Francis Itimai

Personal details
- Born: 27 June 1954 Colonia, Yap
- Died: 28 May 2025 (aged 70)
- Parents: John Thighten Chieng (father); Mary Gilliyan (mother)
- Education: University of the Incarnate Word (B.A.)
- Website: chiengitimai2022.com

Charles Sigfred Chieng (27 June 1954 – 28 May 2025) was a Micronesian politician who served as the ninth governor of Yap from 2023 until his death in 2025.

== Biography ==
Chieng studied political science at the University of Guam. He obtained a bachelor in political science and a bachelor in secondary education from the University of the Incarnate Word in Texas. He had a masters degree in regional planning.

Chieng and Francis Itimai ran in the 2022 election for governor of Yap State against the incumbent governor Jesse Salalu and former Cabinet official James Gartamag Lukan. Chieng won the three-way election with a 44.2% plurality of the vote corresponding to 1,630 votes.

Chieng's lieutenant, Francis Itimai served as acting governor due to Chieng's illness. Chieng died on 28 May 2025, and Itimai became Governor.
