= Marcelo Peterson =

Micronesian politician

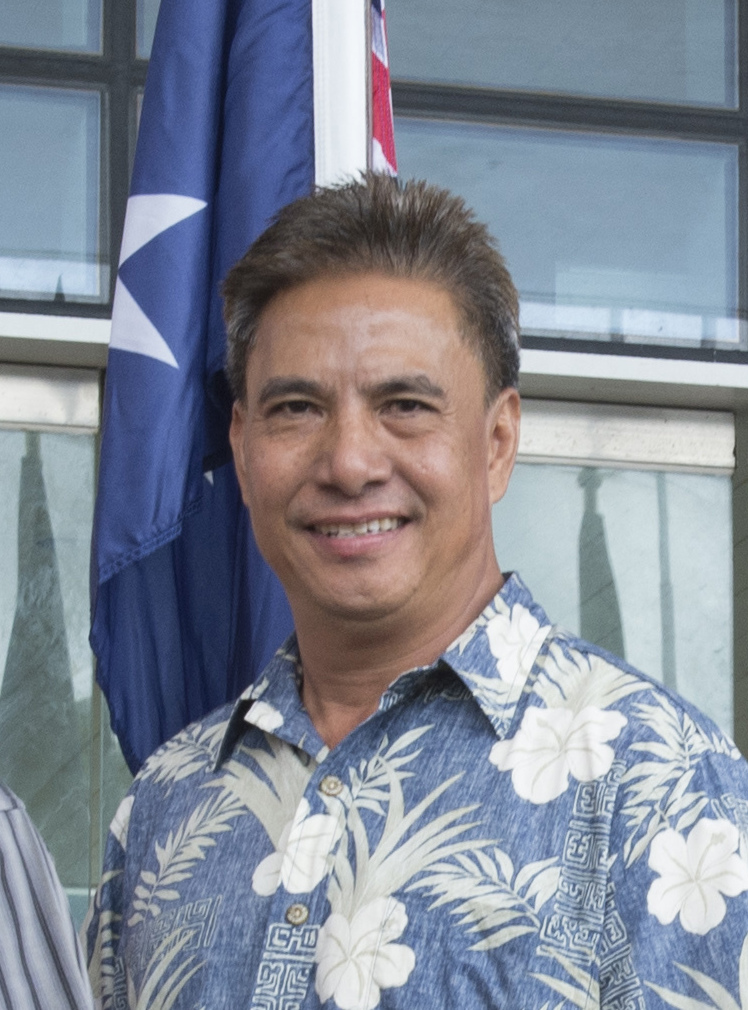
- Peterson in 2015

Governor of Pohnpei
- In office 2015 – January 2020
- Lieutenant: Joseph Saimon (November 2015 – January 2016); Reed Oliver (since January 2016)
- Preceded by: John Ehsa
- Succeeded by: Reed Oliver

Personal details
- Born: November 15, 1961 (age 64)

Marcelo Peterson (born 15 November 1961) is a Micronesian politician. Peterson served as lieutenant governor from 2012 to 2015 until he assumed the position of acting governor after Governor John Ehsa resigned from office sometime later in 2015.

Peterson was officially sworn in as the seventh Governor of Pohnpei, one of the four states that constitute the Federated States of Micronesia, on 11 January 2016.
