= Governor of Yap =

Elected position in Micronesia

The office of the Governor of Yap is the highest elected position in the state of Yap, Federated States of Micronesia.

== List of Governors of Yap ==
Image	Name	Inaugurated	Left office	Lieutenant Governor
	John Mangefel	8 January 1979	12 January 1987	Hilary Tacheliol
	Petrus Tun	12 January 1987	9 January 1995	Tony Tawerilmang
	Vincent A. Figir	9 January 1995	13 January 2003	Mathias K. Kuor (1995–1999); Andrew Yatilman (1999–2003)
	Robert Ruecho	13 January 2003	8 January 2007	Joseph Habuchimai
	Sebastian Anefal	8 January 2007	12 January 2015	Anthony "Tony" Tareg
	Tony Ganngiyan	12 January 2015	14 January 2019	James Yangetmai
	Henry Falan	14 January 2019	17 December 2021	Jesse John Salalu
	Jesse John Salalu	29 December 2021	9 January 2023	Vacant
	Charles Chieng	9 January 2023	28 May 2025	Francis Itimai
	Francis Itimai	29 May 2025	Incumbent	Vacant

== Elections ==
Yap holds an election for its legislature, Governor, and Lieutenant Governor every four years. Of the Governor and Lieutenant Governor, one of them must be born in the outer islands and one must be born from the main island of Yap.
