= Rose Nakanaga =

Micronesian politician

Secretary of Finance of Micronesia
- Incumbent
- Assumed office September 2023
- Preceded by: Eugene Amor

Rose N. Nakanaga is a Micronesian civil servant and the current Secretary of Finance of Micronesia.

In 1993 she got a business administration degree from the Central Michigan University.

She has worked as civil servant in several capacities including assistant secretary in the Department of Finance and Administration for over eleven years. She also was the chairman of the FSM Social Security Administration representing Pohnpei State. She was acting Secretary of Finance from 2011 to 2012 in the Manny Mori administration. Other secretaries were Elina P. Akinaga and Gardenia Aisek. She was "acting" as the President could not get agreement to his choice by congress so she had to be appointed for 60 days and then renewed.

She was confirmed as Secretary of Finance on 19 September 2023.
