= Ruby Thoma =

Nauruan politician

The Honourable Ruby Thoma MP

Member of the Nauruan Parliament for Anetan / Ewa
- In office 6 December 1986 – 14 November 1992
- Preceded by: Lawrence Stephen
- Succeeded by: Lawrence Stephen
- In office 18 November 1995 – 8 February 1997
- Preceded by: Lawrence Stephen
- Succeeded by: Vassal Gadoengin

Minister of Finance of Nauru
- In office November 1996 – December 1996
- President: Kennan Adeang
- Preceded by: Kinza Clodumar
- Succeeded by: Lagumot Harris

Personal details
- Born: 1949 (age 76–77)
- Education: Christchurch School of Medicine
- Profession: midwife

Ruby Thoma (born Ruby Dediya in 1949 in Nauru) is a Nauruan politician.

After completing secondary school in Australia, she was trained as a nurse at Epworth Hospital in Melbourne. She graduated from the University of Otago Christchurch School of Medicine and became a midwife in Nauru.

Entering politics, she stood as a candidate for the 1983 general election, in the Anetan/Ewa constituency. She was supported by a group of women who helped her in her electoral campaign, arguing that voters would benefit from having an educated woman, able to defend the interests of women and children, in Parliament; since the country's independence in 1968, all members of Parliament had been men. She encountered resistance, including from female voters who told her that politics should rightly be left to men. She was unsuccessful.

== Election to Parliament ==
Standing as a candidate again in the 1986 general election, she was elected, becoming the first woman MP in the country's history. There were no political parties in Nauru; all members of Parliament sat as independents, constituting informal coalitions.

=== Minister for Finance and later Parliamentary activity ===
She joined President Hammer DeRoburt's parliamentary majority, and he appointed her minister, from December 1986 until the government was brought down upon losing the confidence of Parliament in August 1989. Ruby Dediya kept her seat in Parliament in the ensuing general election, but lost it in the 1992 election. She founded the People's Movement Association to oppose what she saw as wasteful public spending by President Bernard Dowiyogo's government. As she was a public sector employee, she was consequently sacked from her position as a midwife. She regained her seat in Parliament in the 1995 general election. She was appointed as Minister Assisting the President of Nauru in the cabinet of Kennan Adeang from November 1996 to December 1996, and held the portfolio of Minister of Finance at the same time. However, she lost her seat in 1997. This marked the end of her political career.

== Historic significance of role ==
Throughout her career, she was the only woman MP. No other woman was elected to Parliament until Charmaine Scotty became MP for Yaren in the 2013 general election.

In the late 2000s, she was appointed to preside the commission tasked with overseeing constitutional reform proposals. The projected reforms were ultimately not implemented, as they were rejected by referendum in February 2010.
