= Governor of Pohnpei =

The office of the Governor of Pohnpei is the highest elected position in the state of Pohnpei, Federated States of Micronesia.

Image	Name	Inaugurated	Left office	Lieutenant Governor
	Leo Falcam	May 1, 1979	May 1, 1983	Strik Yoma
	Resio Moses	May 1, 1983	January 13, 1992	Johnny P. David
	Johnny P. David	January 13, 1992	January 8, 1996	Victor Edwin
	Del S. Pangelinan	January 8, 1996	January 10, 2000	Dion Neth
	Johnny P. David	January 10, 2000	January 14, 2008	Jack E. Yakana
	John Ehsa	January 14, 2008	October 2015 (Resigned)	Churchill B. Edward (January 14, 2008 – 2012); Marcelo Peterson (since 2012–2015)
	Marcelo Peterson	October 2015	January 2020	Joseph Saimon (November 2015 – January 2016); Reed Oliver (since January 2016)
	Reed Oliver	January 2020	January 2024	Feliciano Perman (January 2020 - September 2022) Francisco Ioanis (27 January 2023 - January 2024)
	Stevenson Joseph	January 2024	Incumbent	Francisco Ioanis (27 January 2023 - July 2025) Herolyn Movick (Since July 2025)
