= Paul Asa Diema =

Nauruan politician

Member of the Parliament of Nauru
- In office 1968–1971
- Constituency: Anetan

Personal details
- Occupation: Politician

Paul Asa Diema is a politician, who from 1968 to 1971, was a member of the Parliament of Nauru. He represented the Anetan constituency.
