= Department of Education (Federated States of Micronesia) =

Federated States of Micronesia Department of Education (FSM NDOE or FSMED) is the national education department of the Federated States of Micronesia. It is headquartered in Palikir, Pohnpei, Pohnpei State.

== See also ==
- Education in the Federated States of Micronesia
