= Tony Ganngiyan =

Micronesian politician

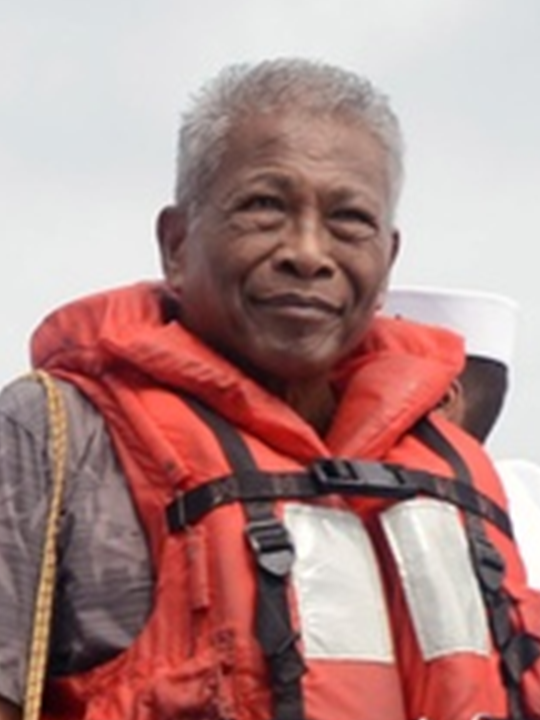
- Ganngiyan Aboard USS Momsen in 2016

6th Governor of Yap
- In office January 12, 2015 – January 14, 2019
- Lieutenant Governor: James Yangetmai
- Preceded by: Sebastian Anefal
- Succeeded by: Henry Falan

Tony Ganngiyan is a Micronesian politician and was the sixth Governor of Yap from 12 January 2015 to January 14, 2019. He ran for a second term in the 2018 Yap election, but he lost to Henry Falan. Ganngiyan is one of twenty-two signatories of the Yap State Constitution. Ganngiyan served previously as the speaker of Yap legislature.
