= Typhoon Chanthu (2010) =

Pacific typhoon in 2010

Typhoon Chanthu (Caloy)
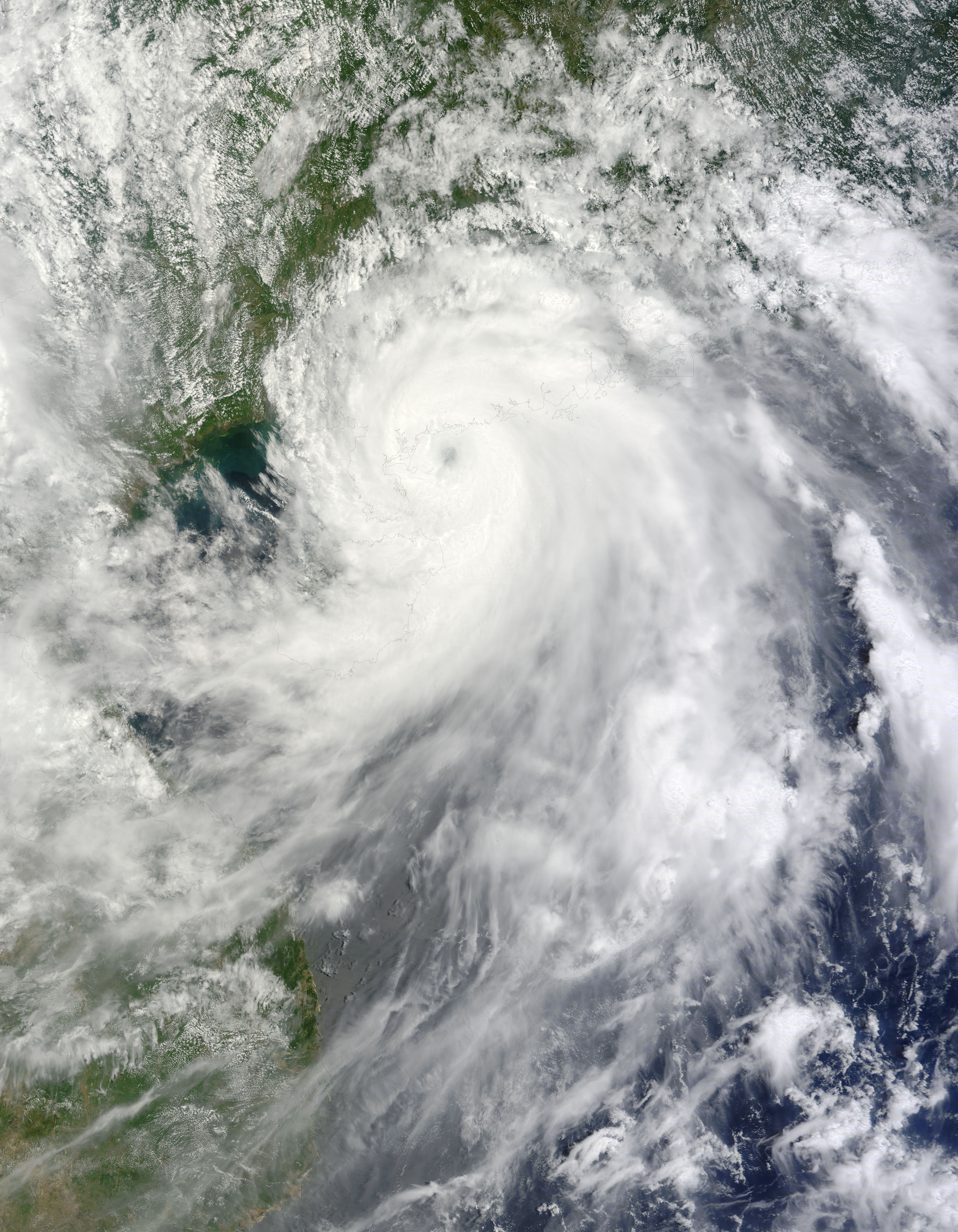
- Typhoon Chanthu at peak intensity near landfall in Guangdong on July 22

Meteorological history
- Formed: July 17, 2010
- Dissipated: July 23, 2010

Typhoon
- 10-minute sustained (JMA)
- Highest winds: 130 km/h (80 mph)
- Lowest pressure: 970 hPa (mbar); 28.64 inHg

Category 1-equivalent typhoon
- 1-minute sustained (SSHWS/JTWC)
- Highest winds: 150 km/h (90 mph)
- Lowest pressure: 963 hPa (mbar); 28.44 inHg

Overall effects
- Fatalities: 27 total
- Damage: $818 million (2010 USD)
- Areas affected: Luzon, Guangdong
- IBTrACS
- Part of the 2010 Pacific typhoon season

Typhoon Chanthu, known in the Philippines as Tropical Storm Caloy, was a weak typhoon that impacted southeastern China in the 2010 Pacific typhoon season. The storm formed on July 17, slowly moving to the Philippines, making direct landfall in Aurora. The storm later was later named respectively as Caloy and Chanthu. The storm later made its way to China, where the storm had its peak intensity. The storm later dissipated on July 23.

As a result of the storm, there was heavy rainfall and flooding in the affected areas. In the Philippines, eight people died, with hundreds of stranded residents. In China, 9 people were killed, with a CNY 5.54 billion (US$817.7 million) loss. In Vietnam, 10 people died, with infrastructure damaged.

== Meteorological history ==
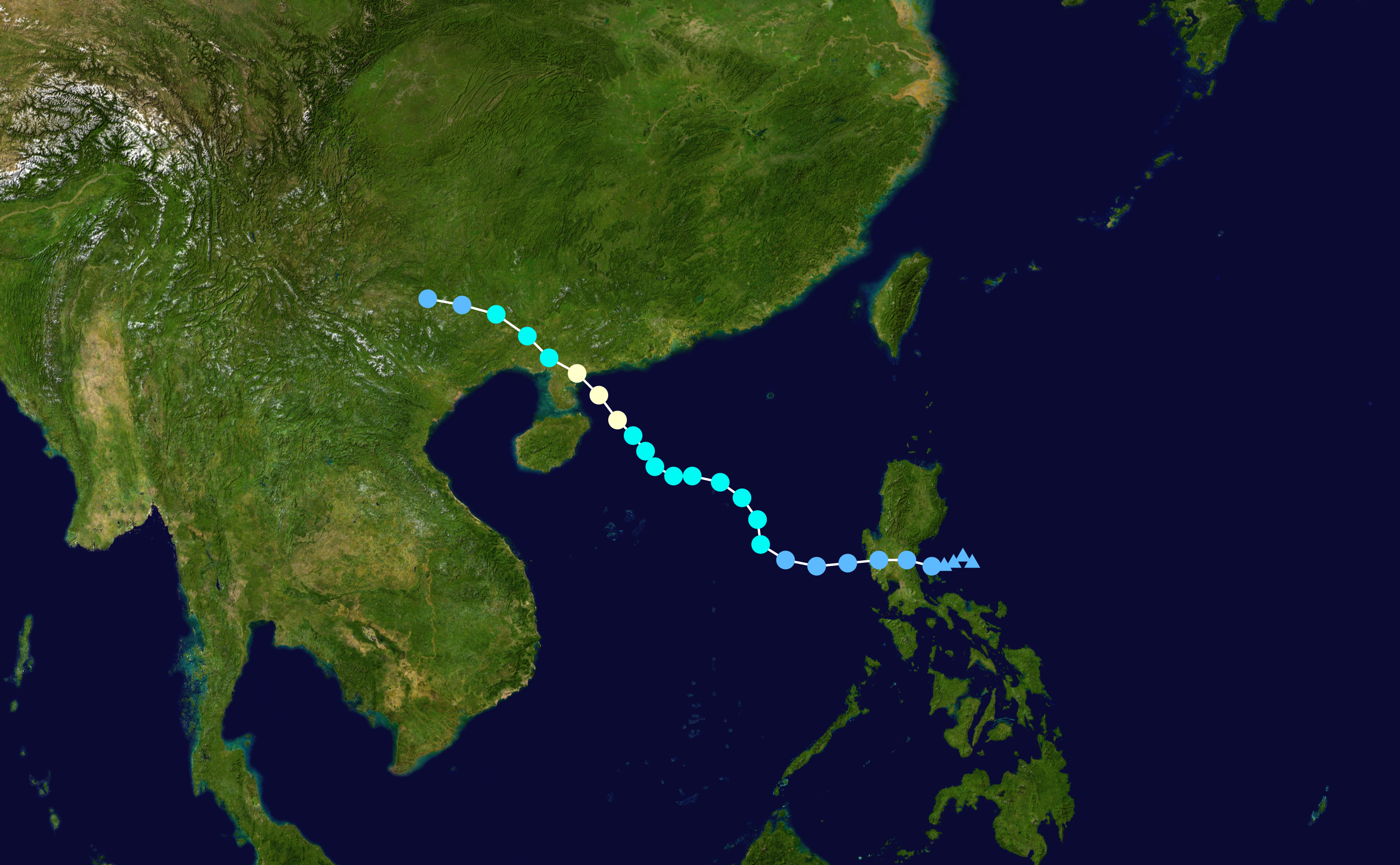
Map plotting the storm's track and intensity, according to the Saffir–Simpson scale Map key Saffir–Simpson scale Tropical depression (≤38 mph, ≤62 km/h) Tropical storm (39–73 mph, 63–118 km/h) Category 1 (74–95 mph, 119–153 km/h) Category 2 (96–110 mph, 154–177 km/h) Category 3 (111–129 mph, 178–208 km/h) Category 4 (130–156 mph, 209–251 km/h) Category 5 (≥157 mph, ≥252 km/h) Unknown Storm type Tropical cyclone Subtropical cyclone Extratropical cyclone, remnant low, tropical disturbance, or monsoon depression

Early on July 17, the JMA reported that a tropical depression had developed about 220 km (135 mi) to the northeast of Manila, Philippines. Later that day the JTWC reported that the depression had a small low level circulation center with deep convection flaring to the northeast of the center with an unfavorable environment. Also spotting dense fog within the Sea of Okhotsk. However, as the low-level circulation center was located close to land and was not very organized, the JTWC declared that there was a poor chance of it becoming a significant tropical cyclone within 48 hours. However, during that day, the depression rapidly consolidated with an anticyclone helping to develop the low-level circulation center. As a result, early the next day the JTWC issued a tropical cyclone formation alert on the depression, however they thought that further development might be hindered as it was located close to land. Whilst it moved along the southern edge of the subtropical ridge, the Depression made landfall in Aurora province at 0600 UTC, before the JTWC initiated advisories later that morning, as the low-level circulation center had consolidated and poleward outflow into the tropical upper tropospheric trough had improved.

As the storm moved to the Philippine Area of Responsibility, the storm was named Caloy by PAGASA. Then. on July 19, PAGASA issued their last advisory on Tropical Storm Caloy as it had moved out of their Area of Responsibility. Then, the storm was officially named Chanthu by the Regional Specialized Meteorological Centre. (Note: The name Chanthu (Khmer: ច័ន្ធូ, [can.ˈtʰuː]) was contributed by Cambodia and means tuberose (Polianthes tuberosa) in Khmer.) Later, Chanthu began to head to China, where it peaked as a Category 1 typhoon. It made landfall in China and soon dissipated hours later.

== Preparations and impact ==
=== Philippines ===
Before the storm hit Aurora, a report was issued by the National Disaster Coordinating Council to let Local Government Units (more so those near the affected areas) to keep an eye on the storm.

In Luzon, heavy rains triggered floods that destroyed at least one house and stranded thousands of people. Eight people were killed in the Philippines. Throughout Aurora, heavy rains triggered flash flooding which destroyed at least one home and stranded hundreds of residents. The Paltic barangay, within Dingalan, became inaccessible to rescuers after the local river topped its banks and washed out nearby slopes. Following the system's development, PAGASA stated that rainfall from system could trigger landslides and flooding in Aurora, the Bicol Region, and Quezon.

=== China ===
On July 28, the Chinese government advised residents to stay indoors. Meteorologists also braced for heavy flooding and rainfall. The government also evacuated people from coast-lying areas, including ports. Other than rainfall, the government is also concerned for the Yangtze, which has experienced heavy flooding, with floodgates opening. A total of 3 million people had to be evacuated because of the storm. In China, The Xinhua State news reported that two people were killed by walls that were blown over by strong gales. The typhoon made landfall in Hainan, killing two people. The typhoon later made landfall near the city of Wuchuan. State-run television broadcast images of large waves crashing on to the Guangdong shore, trees flattened by wind and electric poles collapsed onto streets under heavy rain. Thereafter heavy flooding swept away a 50-year-old man in a village in Hong Kong. The southern Chinese provinces of Guangdong and Hainan braced themselves, ahead of Typhoon Chanthu's expected landfall. Guangdong meteorological authorities, have launched the highest level of disaster response. In all, 9 people were killed in South China, and total economic losses were counted to be CNY 5.54 billion (US$817.7 million).

=== Vietnam ===
The storm triggered heavy rainfall in Vietnam, with an estimated amount of 63–67 millimetres (2.5–2.6 in) in the Lào Cai province. The rain also destructed infrastructure, injuring three people, and blocking a line, which caused a traffic jam. In the Yên Bái province, 13 houses were destroyed by the storm. The major Duong floating bridge was also removed because of high floods in the Đuống River. A total of 10 people died in Vietnam, with 7 fatalities in Hà Giang province, 2 in the Cao Bằng province, and 1 in the Lao Cai province. In the Bắc Giang province, 10 communes were isolated and 44,100 hectares (170 sq mi) of destroyed rice crops. Also, in Yên Bái province, 18 hectares (0.069 sq mi) of rice was damaged while 5 hectares (0.019 sq mi) of fishponds were damaged.

== Aftermath ==
After 700 flooding deaths and multiple storms, the Chinese government added flood reinforcements for thousands of reservoirs in China. "The central government is planning to reinforce all the small reservoirs, with a special safety official in charge, and enough money for maintenance," said Zhou Xuewen, head of the planning department with the Ministry of Water Resources.

== See also ==
- Typhoon Mujigae - Had a similar track but was more intense when striking Guangdong
