= Outline of Nauru =

Overview of and topical guide to Nauru

The Flag of Nauru

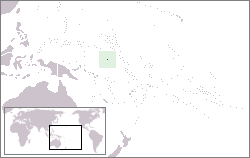
The location of Nauru

The following outline is provided as an overview of and topical guide to Nauru:

Nauru (officially Republic of Naoero) – sovereign island nation located in the Micronesian South Pacific. Its nearest neighbour is Banaba Island in the Republic of Kiribati, 300 kilometres (190 mi) due east. Nauru is the world's smallest island nation, covering just 21 square kilometres (8 mi^{2}), the smallest independent republic, and the only republican state in the world without an official capital. It is the least populous member of the United Nations.

Initially inhabited by Micronesian and Polynesian peoples, Nauru was annexed and designated a colony by Germany in the late 19th century, and became a mandate territory administered by Australia, New Zealand, and the United Kingdom following World War I. The island was occupied by Japan during World War II, and after the war entered into trusteeship again. Nauru achieved independence in 1968.

Nauru is a phosphate rock island, and its primary economic activity since 1907 has been the export of phosphate mined from the island. With the exhaustion of phosphate reserves, its environment severely degraded by mining, and the trust established to manage the island's wealth significantly reduced in value, the government of Nauru has resorted to unusual measures to obtain income. In the 1990s, Nauru briefly became a tax haven and money laundering centre. Since 2001, it accepted aid from the Australian government; in exchange for this aid, Nauru housed, until early 2008, an offshore detention centre that held and processed asylum seekers trying to enter Australia.

== General reference ==
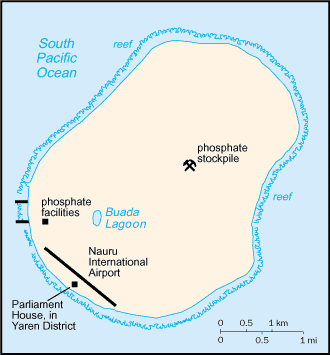
An enlargeable basic map of Nauru

- Pronunciation:
- Common English country name: Nauru
- Official English country name: The Republic of Naoero
- Common endonym(s): Naoero
- Official endonym(s): Repubrikin Naoero
- Adjectival(s): Nauruan
- Demonym(s): Nauruans, dei-Naoero
- ISO country codes: NR, NRU, 520
- ISO region codes: See ISO 3166-2:NR
- Internet country code top-level domain: .nr

== Geography of Nauru ==
Geography of Nauru

- Nauru is: a country
- Location:
  - Southern Hemisphere and Eastern Hemisphere
  - Pacific Ocean
    - South Pacific
      - Oceania
        - Micronesia
  - Time zone: UTC+12
  - Extreme points of Nauru
    - High: Command Ridge 71 m (233 ft)
    - Low: South Pacific Ocean 0 m
  - Land boundaries: none
  - Coastline: South Pacific Ocean 30 km
- Population of Nauru: 10,000 - 214th most populous country
- Area of Nauru: 21 km^{2}
- Nauruan navigational system

=== Environment of Nauru ===
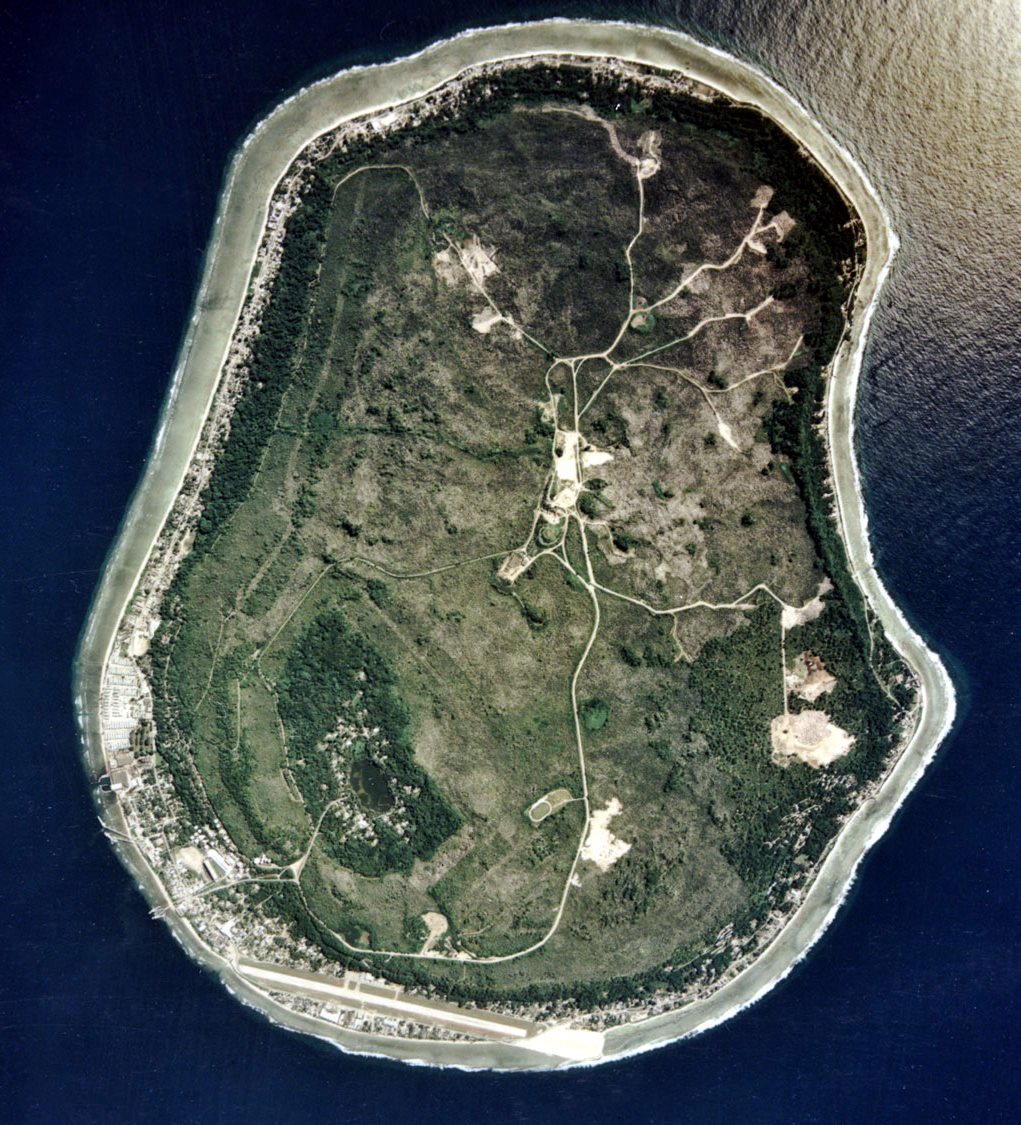
An enlargeable satellite image of Nauru

- Climate of Nauru
- Geology of Nauru
- Wildlife of Nauru
    - Birds of Nauru
    - Mammals of Nauru

==== Natural geographic features of Nauru ====
- Islands of Nauru: Nauru consists in a single island
- Lakes of Nauru: one: Buada Lagoon
- Mountains of Nauru: none
- Rivers of Nauru: none
- World Heritage Sites in Nauru: none

==== Administrative divisions of Nauru ====
Administrative divisions of Nauru

- Districts of Nauru
- Capital of Nauru: the Yaren District is the de facto capital of Nauru
- Cities of Nauru

=== Demography of Nauru ===
Demographics of Nauru

== Government and politics of Nauru ==
Politics of Nauru

- Form of government: parliamentary republic
- Capital of Nauru: Yaren District (de facto only; there is no official capital)
- Elections in Nauru
- Political parties in Nauru: none

=== Branches of the government of Nauru ===
Government of Nauru

==== Executive branch of the government of Nauru ====
- Head of state and Head of government: President of Nauru, David Adeang

==== Legislative branch of the government of Nauru ====
- Parliament of Nauru (unicameral)

==== Judicial branch of the government of Nauru ====
- Supreme Court of Nauru

=== Foreign relations of Nauru ===
Foreign relations of Nauru

- Diplomatic missions in Nauru
- Diplomatic missions of Nauru
- Australia-Nauru relations

==== International organisation membership ====
The Republic of Nauru is a member of:

- African, Caribbean, and Pacific Group of States (ACP)
- Asian Development Bank (ADB)
- Commonwealth of Nations
- Food and Agriculture Organization (FAO)
- International Civil Aviation Organization (ICAO)
- International Criminal Court (ICCt)
- International Criminal Police Organization (Interpol)
- International Olympic Committee (IOC)
- International Telecommunication Union (ITU)
- Organisation for the Prohibition of Chemical Weapons (OPCW)
- Pacific Islands Forum (PIF)
- Secretariat of the Pacific Community (SPC)
- South Pacific Regional Trade and Economic Cooperation Agreement (Sparteca)
- United Nations (UN)
- United Nations Conference on Trade and Development (UNCTAD)
- United Nations Educational, Scientific, and Cultural Organization (UNESCO)
- Universal Postal Union (UPU)
- World Health Organization (WHO)

=== Law and order in Nauru ===
Law of Nauru

- Constitution of Nauru
- Crime in Nauru
- Human rights in Nauru
  - LGBT rights in Nauru
  - Freedom of religion in Nauru
- Law enforcement in Nauru

=== Military of Nauru ===
Nauru has no regular military forces. Nauru's defence is the responsibility of Australia.

== History of Nauru ==
History of Nauru

- Japanese occupation of Nauru
- Nauruan Civil War
- Nauru Phosphate Royalties Trust

== Culture of Nauru ==
Culture of Nauru

- Cuisine of Nauru
- Languages of Nauru
- Media in Nauru
  - Television in Nauru
- National symbols of Nauru
  - Coat of arms of Nauru
  - Flag of Nauru
  - National anthem of Nauru
- People of Nauru
- Public holidays in Nauru
- Religion in Nauru
- World Heritage Sites in Nauru: None

=== Art in Nauru ===
- Art in Nauru
- Music of Nauru

=== Sports in Nauru ===
Sports in Nauru

- Football in Nauru
- Nauru at the Olympics

== Economy and infrastructure of Nauru ==
Economy of Nauru

- Economic rank, by nominal GDP (2007): 189th (one hundred and eighty ninth)
- Communications in Nauru
  - Internet in Nauru
- Currency of Nauru: Dollar
  - ISO 4217: AUD
- Tourism in Nauru
  - Visa policy of Nauru
- Transport in Nauru

== Education in Nauru ==
Education in Nauru

- Nauru Secondary School

== Infrastructure of Nauru ==
- Transportation in Nauru
  - Airports in Nauru
  - Rail transport in Nauru

== See also ==
Nauru

- Index of Nauru-related articles
- List of international rankings
- List of Nauru-related topics
- Member state of the Commonwealth of Nations
- Member state of the United Nations
- Outline of geography
- Outline of Oceania
