= Economy of Nauru =

Small Pacific Island economy

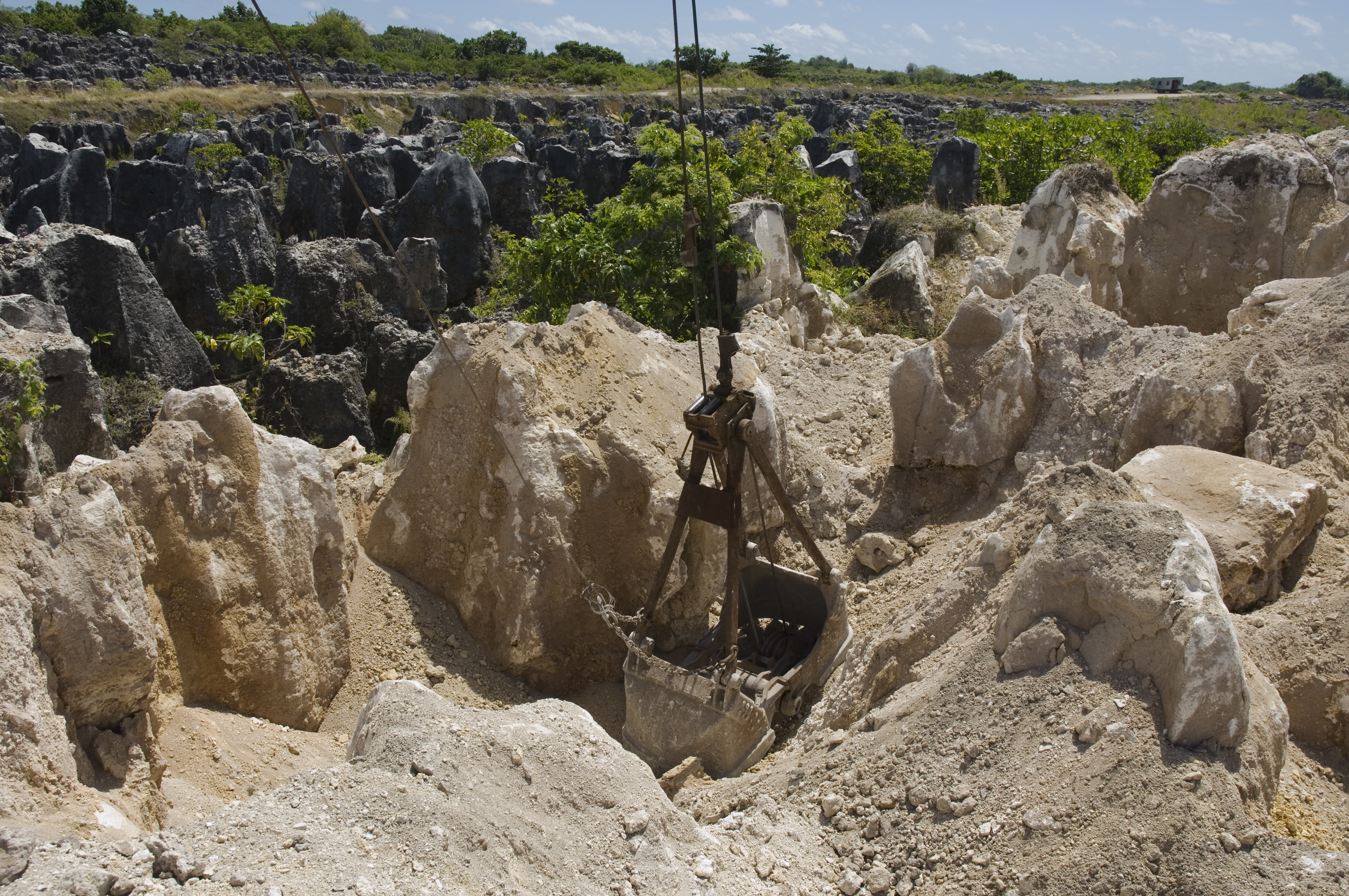
- Limestone pinnacles remain after phosphate mining removed the guano at one of Nauru's secondary mines
- Currency: Australian dollar (A$ or AUD)
- Fiscal year: 1 July – 30 June
- Country group: Developing/Emerging; Upper-middle income economy

Statistics
- Population: ▲12,511 (2021)
- GDP: ▲$0.196 billion (nominal;(2026); ▲$0.151 billion (PPP; (2026)
- GDP rank: 190th (nominal; 2026); 193th (PPP; 2026)
- GDP growth: ▲0.6% (2023); ▲1.8% (2024); ▲2.0% (2025); ▲1.6% (2026f)
- GDP per capita: ▲$16,076 (nominal; (2026); ▲$12,374 (PPP;(2026)
- GDP per capita rank: 70th (nominal; 2025); 126th (PPP; 2026)
- GDP by sector: Agriculture: 6.1%, industry: 33%, services: 60.8% (2009 est.)
- Inflation (CPI): ▲1.7% (2021 est.)
- Unemployment: 25% (2011)
- Main industries: Phosphate mining, offshore banking, coconut products

External
- Exports: US$135 million (2015 est.)
- Export goods: Fish, calcium phosphates, low-voltage protection equipment, air conditioners, leather apparel
- Main export partners: Thailand(+) 34%; Australia(-) 16%; United States(+) 13%; South Korea(+) 10%; Philippines(+) 9%; Japan(+) 7%; France(+) 5%; Spain(+) 4%
- Imports: US$64.9 million (2016 est.)
- Import goods: Refined petroleum, construction vehicles, tug boats, poultry meats, cars
- Main import partners: Taiwan(+) 52%; Australia(-) 28%
- Gross external debt: US$33.3 million (2004 est.)

Public finance
- Government debt: 62% of GDP (2017 est.)
- Revenue: US$103 million (2017 est.)
- Spending: US$113.4 million (2017 est.)
- All values, unless otherwise stated, are in US dollars.

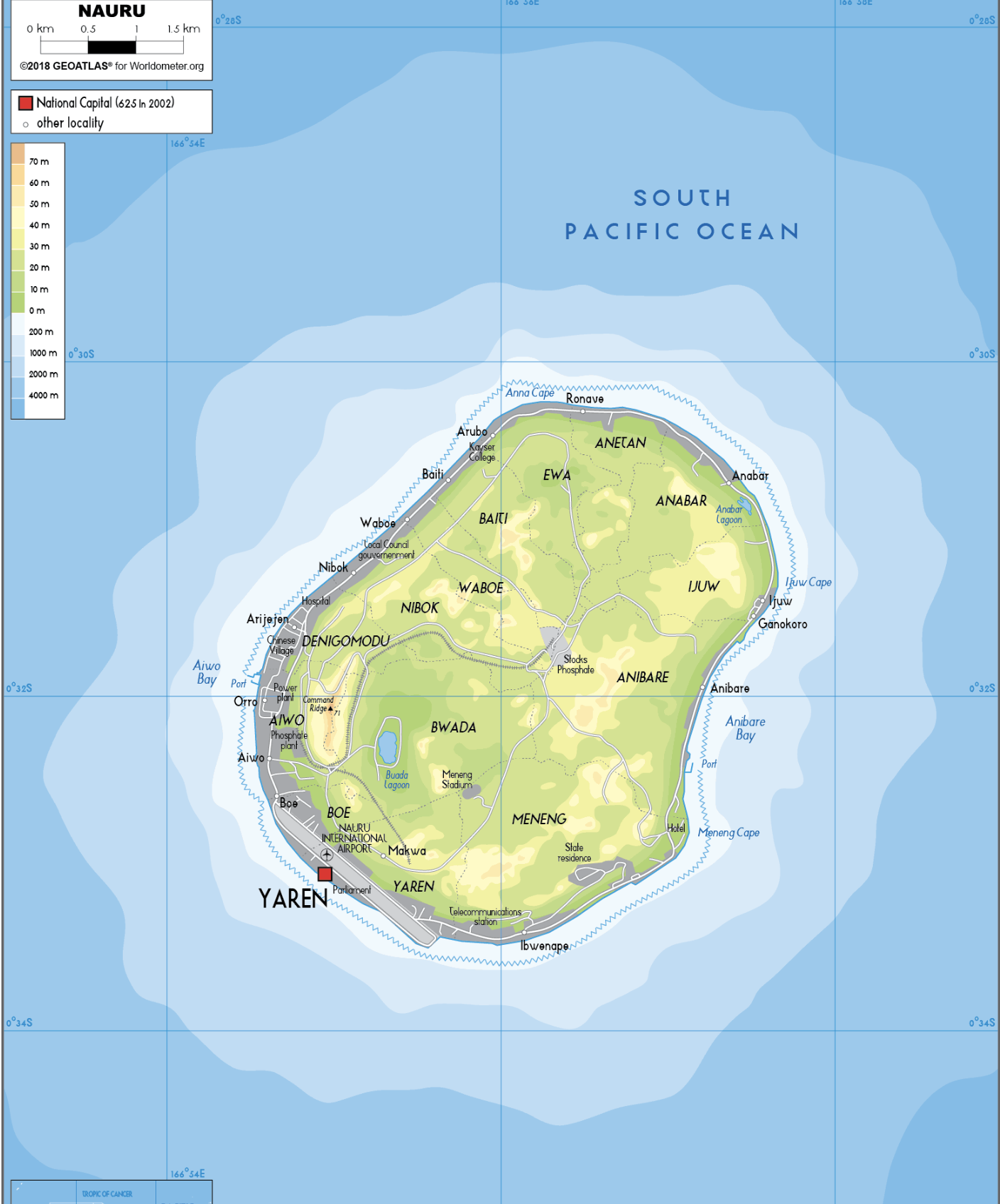
Map of Nauru

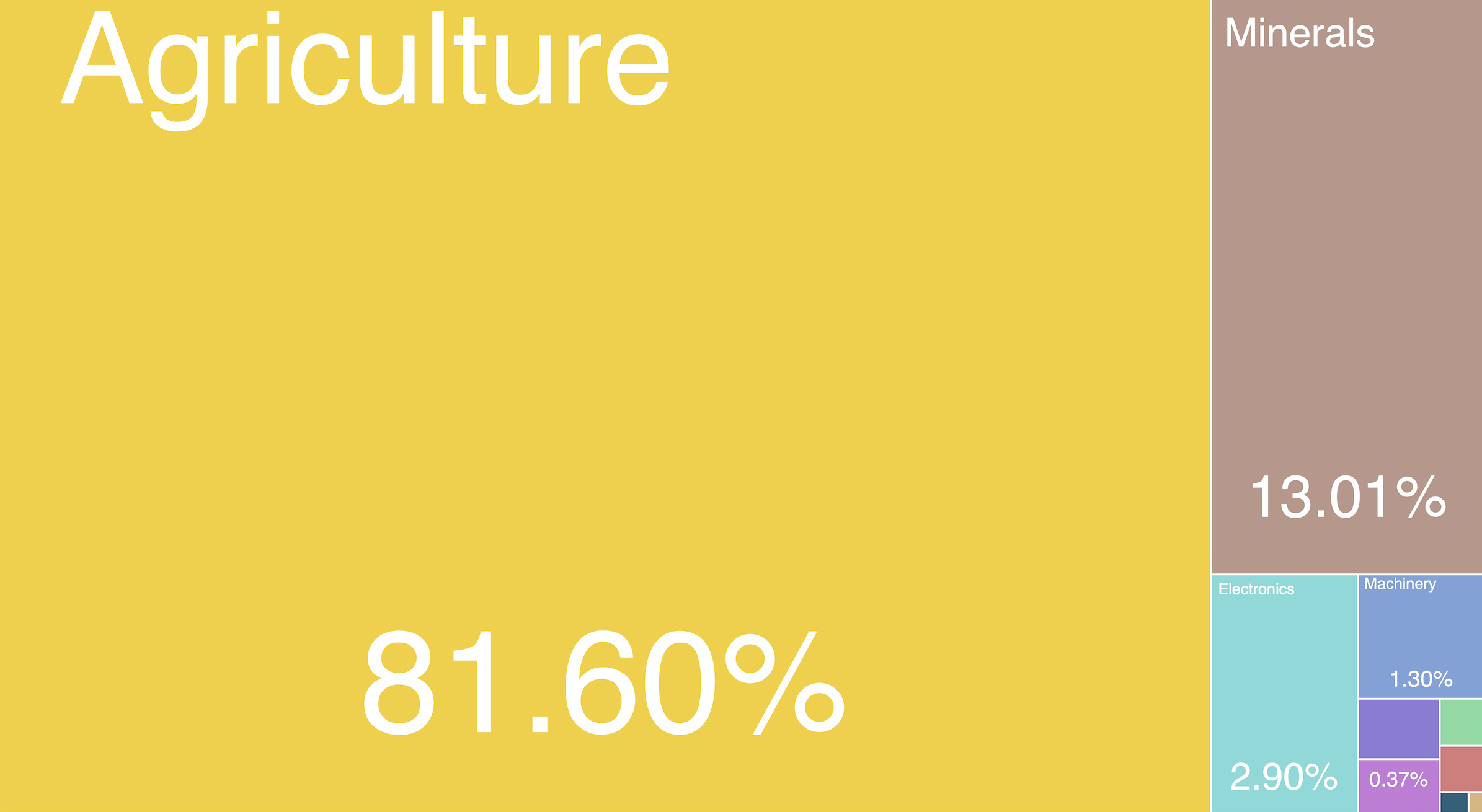
Tree map of Nauru

The economy of Nauru, officially the Republic of Naoero, is tiny, based on a population in 2019 of only 11,550 people. The economy has historically been based on phosphate mining. With primary phosphate reserves exhausted by the end of the 2010s, Nauru has sought to diversify its sources of income. In 2020, Nauru's main sources of income were the sale of fishing rights in Nauru's territorial waters, and revenue from the Regional Processing Centre (an offshore Australian immigration detention facility).

Nauru is dependent on foreign aid, chiefly from Australia, New Zealand, and formerly Taiwan.

== Economic performance ==
In the years after independence in 1968, Nauru possessed one of the highest GDPs per capita in the world due to its rich phosphate deposits. In anticipation of the exhaustion of phosphate deposits, a substantial amount of the income from phosphates was invested in trust funds aiming to help cushion the transition and provide for Nauru's economic future. However, because of heavy spending, including poor foreign investment, the government is now facing bankruptcy. To cut costs the government called for a freeze on wages, a reduction in public service staffing, privatisation of numerous government agencies, and closure of some of Nauru's overseas consulates. Economic uncertainty caused by financial mismanagement and corruption, combined with shortages of basic goods, resulted in domestic unrest. In 2004, Nauru was faced with chaos amid political strife and the collapse of the island's telecommunications system. Moreover, the deterioration of housing and hospitals has continued.

Few comprehensive statistics on the Nauru economy exist, with estimates of Nauru's GDP varying widely. According to IMF estimates, Nauru’s nominal GDP in 2004 was approximately US$32 million. Nauru receives about US$20 million foreign aid a year from Australia.

The nation's economy has grown significantly since 2012, with help from the reopening of the Nauru Regional Processing Centre, funded by Australia.

The most recent 2022–23 Nauru Budget recognised expected revenues of $252.5 million and expenditure of $251.9 million (20% increase from Budget 2021–2022) with a $549,000 surplus balance. The surplus will provide cash reserves at the bank and help Nauru manage future economic uncertainties.

== Balance of payments ==
Phosphate is Nauru's only export product, although the government also receives relatively significant foreign exchange income from licensing its rich skipjack tuna fishing grounds to foreign fishing vessels, which land an annual average of 50,000 tonnes of Nauru zone-caught tuna overseas. In 2004 income from phosphate export was US$640,000, with Australia, New Zealand and Japan serving as the country's major export markets. In the same year the Nauru government budget shows that income from licensing foreign fishing vessels was over US$3,000,000.

Nauru needs to import almost all basic and capital goods, including food, water, fuel, and manufactured goods, with Australia and New Zealand as its major import sources. In 2004 Nauru's imports totaled about US$19.8 million.

== Finance ==
Nauru has been a cash economy since at least 2004, after the Republic of Nauru Finance Corporation went bankrupt and ceased operations in the early 2000s, the licenses of all offshore banks were revoked by the Nauru government in 2004 and the Bank of Nauru closed in 2006. Nauru uses the Australian dollar for its currency. Most government payments are executed through electronic funds transfer. Electronic funds transfer at point of sale was introduced in 2020. The government is required to periodically fly in Australian currency to maintain liquidity.

On 2 June 2015, an agency of Bendigo and Adelaide Bank, Australia's fifth largest bank, was established in Nauru by the Department of Finance. It was the first bank in Nauru since 2006. Effective from the end of April 2016, Westpac, one of Australia's largest banks, ceased to have any dealings with the Nauru government. On 21 April 2016, it was announced that the Bendigo Bank was facing pressure also to close its operation in Nauru.

On 14 November 2023, Bendigo and Adelaide Bank announced its intention to cease operation in Nauru by December 2024. On 24 January 2024, Nauru formally re-established diplomatic ties with the People's Republic of China after withdrawing recognition of Taiwan. In early March 2024, the Bank of China sent a delegation to Nauru to discuss its banking problems. On 18 March, Bendigo and Adelaide Bank announced its intention to delay its exit from Nauru, from December 2024 to July 2025.

On 11 August 2025, following the exit of Bendigo and Adelaide Bank on 8 August, the Commonwealth Bank of Australia (CommBank) established an agency in Nauru to provide banking services to residents.

== Taxation ==
On 1 October 2014, an income tax was imposed in Nauru for the first time, with high income earners paying a flat rate of 10%. The government spending in 2015 was forecast to be under US$92 million. Taxes include an airport departure tax and a bed tax at the Meneñ Hotel. The 2007–08 Budget saw the increase of existing excises on cigarettes and duty on imports. A tax on sugary foods was also introduced, chiefly to help combat Nauru's diabetes epidemic. In 2023, a tax rate of 20% was imposed on wages exceeding $9,240 per month. The tax rate is the same for residents and non-residents who are employees in Nauru. There is a different tax rate for the provision of services as opposed to employment taxes.

== Tax haven status ==
Historically Nauru was regarded as a tax haven due to the operation of its international financial centre, which offered amongst other things offshore banking services. In 2001, Nauru was blacklisted internationally over concerns it had become a haven for money laundering. Amendments made in 2004 abolished Nauru's Offshore Banking sector and, as recognised in Nauru's latest anti–money laundering and combating the financing of terrorism (AML/CFT) review, Nauru's offshore sector is now limited to a small offshore company register.

In July 2017 the Organisation for Economic Co-operation and Development (OECD) upgraded its rating of Nauru's standards of tax transparency. Nauru had been listed alongside fourteen other countries that had failed to show that they could comply with international tax transparency standards and regulations. The OECD subsequently put Nauru through a fast-tracked compliance process and the country was given a "largely compliant" rating.

== Relationship with Australia ==
Currently, Nauru is heavily dependent on Australia as its major source of financial support. In 2001, Nauru signed an agreement with Australia to accommodate asylum seekers (mostly from Iraq and Afghanistan) on the island, in return for millions of dollars in aid. This agreement, referred to as the "Pacific Solution", came to an end in 2007, prompting Nauruan concerns about the future of the island's revenue. Australia has also sent financial experts to Nauru to help the tiny nation overcome its economic problems. However, serious questions remain about the long-term viability of Nauru's economy, with uncertainties about the rehabilitation of mined land and the replacement of income from phosphates.

In 2008, talks began between Australia and Nauru regarding the future of the former's economic development aid to the latter. Nauruan Foreign and Finance Minister Dr. Kieren Keke stated that his country did not want aid handouts. One possible solution currently being explored would be for Australia to assist Nauru in setting up a "boat repair industry" for regional fishing vessels.

=== Nauru detention centre ===
The Nauru detention centre was established by the Australian government, with Nauruan agreement, in 2001 to cater for up to 800 refugees and asylum seekers under Australia's Pacific solution. The centre is seen by Nauruans as an important source of employment opportunities, in addition to the pledge of A$20 million for development activities. The program was gradually scaled back after 14 detainee deaths, multiple suicide attempts and six referrals to the International Criminal Court.

== Employment ==
- Labour force are mainly employed in mining phosphates, public administration by RONPhos, education and transport
- In 2004, the unemployment rate was close to 90%. In February 2008, foreign affairs minister Dr. Kieren Keke stated: "We have got a major unemployment crisis in front of us." By 2011, the unemployment rate had decreased to 23%.
- Main industries are phosphate mining, offshore banking, coconut products
- Electricity production (fossil fuels) and consumption are around 30 GWh (2000)
- Agriculture is not a major employer, coconuts are the main produce

== Sectors ==
=== Phosphate mining ===
The economies of Banaba and Nauru have been almost wholly dependent on phosphate, which has led to environmental disaster on these islands, with 80% of the islands' surfaces having been strip-mined. The phosphate deposits were virtually exhausted by 2000, although some small-scale mining is still in progress on Nauru. Mining ended on Banaba in 1979.

=== Transport ===
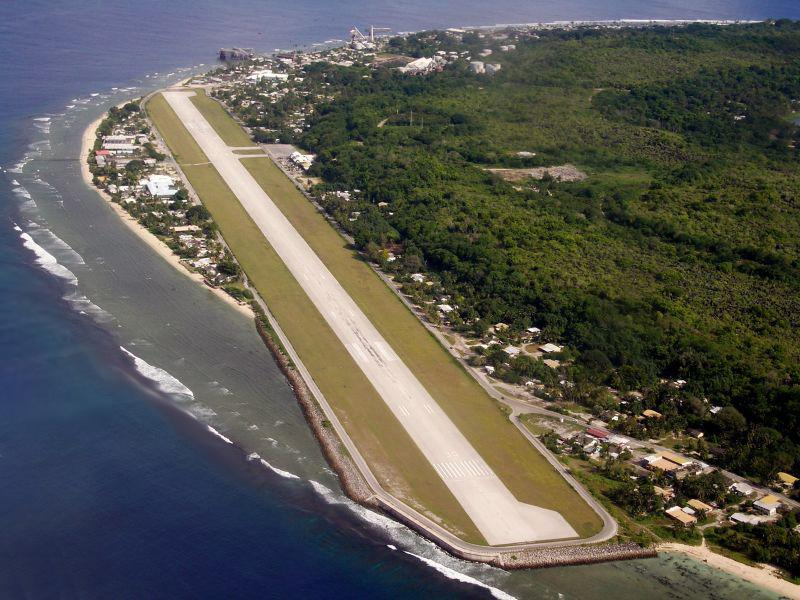
View of Nauru International Airport

Transport in Nauru includes pedestrian, bicycle, automobile, train, and airplane. There is no harbour or port as of the 2020s, as the island is surrounded by a rocky coral reef, however an international port is currently under construction.

=== Telecommunications ===
Nauru has one government-owned radio station and two television stations, one of which is government owned. The island has telephone service under country code 674. The island's Internet service is provided by CenPacNet and Digicel Nauru. The country's ccTLD is .nr.

=== Education ===
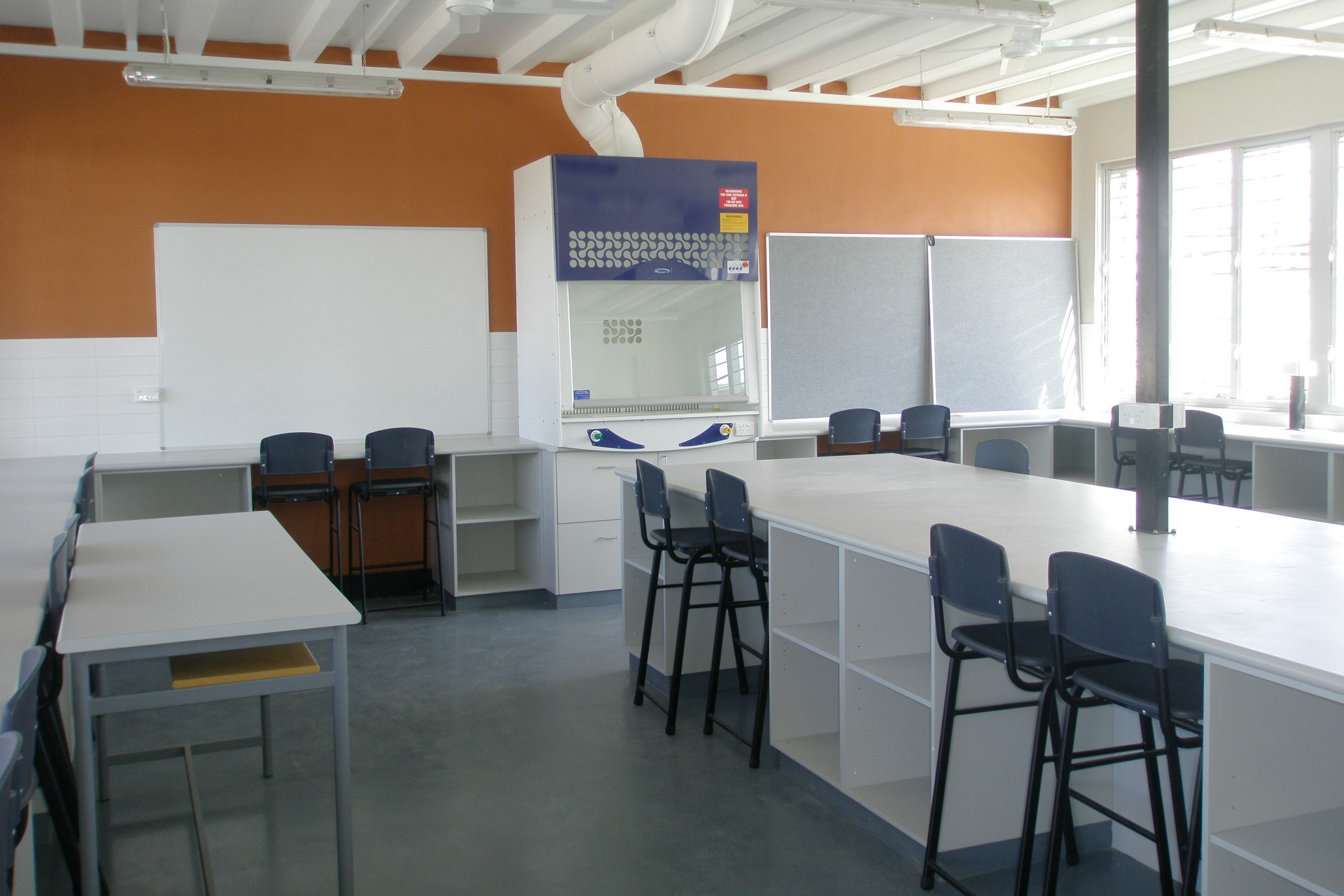
A classroom at Nauru Secondary School after refurbishment as part of an Australian aid package to the island state.

Education in Nauru is compulsory for children between the ages of 5 and 16. There are eleven schools in Nauru, including three primary schools and two secondary schools (Nauru College and Nauru Secondary School). There is an Able/Disable Centre for children with disabilities. Education at these schools is free. In 2011, the Australian Department of Foreign Affairs and Trade reported that 3,026 children were enrolled at Nauru's schools. The previous Minister for Education was the Hon. Charmaine Scotty, MP from 2013. The current Minister is Asterio Appi.

The Nauru Campus of the University of the South Pacific (USP) is located in Nauru Learning Village Yaren District since 2018, and was previously in Aiwo District. USP began teaching remote courses in the 1970s. A local campus was established in 1987. Courses of study focus on the fields of education and business. The campus also serves the broader community through a Continuing education programme.

Education in Nauru was first formalised by the work of Protestant missionaries in the early twentieth century. The first schools were established by missionary Philip Delaporte, teaching children literacy in the Nauru language. In 1923, the joint administration of the United Kingdom, Australia and New Zealand made education compulsory and established a curriculum based in the English language. Australia's AusAID funded an $11 million refurbishment of Nauru Secondary School beginning in late 2007. The project to assist in improving educational performance in Nauru was completed in 2010. Part of the project focused on enhancing Nauruan construction capacity.

The Human Rights Measurement Initiative (HRMI) finds that Nauru is fulfilling only 83.9% of what it should be fulfilling for the right to education based on the country's level of income. HRMI breaks down the right to education by looking at the rights to both primary education and secondary education. While taking into consideration Nauru's income level, the nation is achieving 93.5% of what should be possible based on its resources (income) for primary education but only 74.2% for secondary education.

=== Healthcare ===
In Nauru, health is challenged by obesity, limited lifespan and childhood health.

== Economic statistics ==
- GDP: purchasing power parity – US$60 million (2001 est.)
- GDP per capita: purchasing power parity – US$5,000 (2001 est.)
- Inflation rate (consumer prices): -3.6% (1993)
- Budget: revenues: US$23.4 million; expenditures: US$ million (1995/96)
- External debt: US$33.3 million
- Economic aid – receives around US$2.25 million from Australia (1996/97 est.)
- Currency: Australian dollar

The fiscal year runs from 1 July to 30 June.

== Data ==
The following table shows the main economic indicators in 2004–2022 (with IMF staff estimates for 2019–2027). Inflation below 3% is in green.

Year	GDP (in mil. US$PPP)	GDP per capita (in US$ PPP)	GDP (in mil. US$ nominal)	GDP per capita (in US$ nominal)	Inflation rate	Government debt (as % of GDP)
2004	▲35	▲3,174.9	▲32	▲3,504.2	n/a	n/a
2005	▼36	▼3,167.6	▼31	▲3,647.1	▲8.6%	n/a
2006	▼40	▲3,200.7	▼29	▲4,438.1	▲19.3%	n/a
2007	▲32	▲3,487.7	▼23	▼3,487.7	▲5.6%	n/a
2008	▲40	▲3,965.3	▲37	▲4,207.1	▲1.03%	n/a
2009	▲43	▲4,587.7	▲44	▲4,541.9	▲3.5%	▼247.9%
2010	▲49	▲4,748.1	▲47	▲4,892.8	▲-1.9%	▼243.2%
2011	▲55	▲6,529.4	▲66	▲5,473.5	▲-3.3%	▼188.1%
2012	▲62	▲9,382.6	▲97	▲5,980.83	▲0.2%	▼127.5%
2013	▲83	▼9,103.5	▲99	▲7,642.4	▲-1.1%	▼121.6%
2014	▲107	▼8,865.6	▲105	▲9,042.8	▲0.2%	▼105.8%
2015	▲112	▼6,994.1	▼87	▼8,974.5	▲9.7%	▼80%
2016	▲116	▲7,674.4	▲100	▼8,927.4	▲8.1%	▼79.5%
2017	▼112	▲8,152.9	▲110	▼8,341.6	▲5.1%	▼77.5%
2018	▲121	▲9,398.5	▲124	▲9,197.2	▲0.4%	▼75.1%
2019	▲125	▼9,365.4	▼119	▲9,856.4	▲4.3%	▼62.8%
2020	▲127	▼8,866.8	▼114	▼9,852.9	▲-6.5%	▼61.3%
2021	▲134	▲10,139.1	▲133	▲10,221.4	▲1.2%	▼27%
2022	▲145	▼10,004.7	▲134	▲10,834.3	▲2.0%	▲27.3%
2023	▲154	▲10,096.2	▲138	▲11,228.6	▲2.0%	▼24.9%
2024	▲161	▲10,162.8	▲142	▲11,512.8	▲2.0%	▼22.8%
2025	▲167	▼10,156.6	▲144	▲11,733.4	▲2.0%	▼20.9%
2026	▲173	▼10,088.1	▲146	▲11,934.3	▲2.0%	▼19%
2027	▲180	▼10,071.5	▲149	▲12,150.8	▲2.0%	▼16.5%

== Trade ==
Exports of Nauru by product category (2019) Chemical products Transportation Machines Mineral products Plastics and rubbers Metals Foodstuffs Precious metals Textiles Instruments Animal products Vegetable products Paper goods Footwear and headwear Miscellaneous Stone and glass Wood products Animal and vegetable bi-products Animal hides Arts and antiques Weapons

- Exports – valued at US$30 million (2018). Fish, calcium phosphates, low-voltage protection equipment, air conditioners, leather apparel. Major trading partners include Thailand 34%, Australia 16%, United States 13%, and South Korea 10%.
- Imports – valued at US$90 million (2018). Refined petroleum, construction vehicles, tug boats, poultry meats, cars. Major partners are Taiwan 52% and Australia 28%.

== See also ==
- Phosphate mining in Nauru
- Nauru Phosphate Corporation
- Nauru Phosphate Royalties Trust
- Ministry of Finance of Nauru
- Tourism in Nauru
