= Mass media in Nauru =

Mass media in Nauru remains underdeveloped, but the Australian aid program AusAID has been financing and supporting its development for a number of years. A state-owned fortnightly newspaper, Mwinen Ko, was launched in either 2009 or 2010. Former Australian Broadcasting Corporation broadcaster Rod Henshaw is serving as interim media director for the Nauruan government.

== Press ==
In 2009, the Nauruan press consisted of the Central Star News and the Nauru Chronicle, both of which were published fortnightly, and the government-issued Nauru Bulletin, which was published weekly.

In 2010, the first edition of Mwinen Ko, a monthly community newspaper, was published. The Nauru Bulletin is managed by the Government Information Office (GIO) and is distributed by email and on the official website on a fortnightly basis.

== Television ==
Nauru Television (NTV) -operated by the state-owned, non-commercial Nauru Broadcasting Service- was launched in 1991. In addition to local programmes, it broadcasts programmes from the Australian Broadcasting Corporation's Australia Network and from New Zealand television. It is the only television company in the country.

== Radio ==
Radio Nauru, also operated by the Nauru Broadcasting Service, broadcasts local content and programmes from Radio Australia and the British Broadcasting Corporation.

== Media Freedom ==
As of 2015, Freedom House classifies Nauru press as "Partly Free". Classified as "free" from 2002 to 2013, it was downgraded to "partly free" in 2014.

There have been several reports of media censorship within Nauru, under President Baron Waqa (elected in 2013). In August 2013, Acting President David Adeang placed a media ban on opposition criticism of the asylum seeker deal between Australia and Nauru. Just over two weeks earlier, media coverage of the July 2013 riot at the Nauru detention centre was restricted.

Police confiscated a video recording of a parliamentary session from Nauru Television in May 2000.

In January 2014, the visa cost for foreign journalists rose from $200 to $8000. Australian opposition leader Bill Shorten was quoted as saying "There's more than one way to bar the scrutiny of the press ... it could be a measure aimed at discouraging Australian journalists from reporting". However, the Nauruan government has stated that the increase was only intended to provide more revenue for the island, and was not implemented to deter reporting.
