= Nauru (disambiguation) =

Nauru is an island country in Oceania. It may also refer to:

- Nauru language, an Austronesian language
- Nauru, Tanzania, a Tanzanian village

== See also ==
- Nauruan (disambiguation)
