= List of newspapers in Nauru =

This is a list of newspapers in Nauru.

- Bulletin
- Central Star News
- Mwinen Ko (state-owned)
- The Nauru Chronicle

== See also ==
- List of newspapers
- Media of Nauru
