= Music of Nauru =

The music of Nauru demonstrates its Micronesian heritage.

== National anthem ==
The national anthem of Nauru is "Nauru Bwiema" ("Song of Nauru"). Margaret Hendrie wrote the words; Laurence Henry Hicks composed the music.

== Noted contemporary composer ==
Baron Waqa, who has also served as a government minister, has been noted for his musical composition activity.

The patriotic song "Eko Dogin" (Forevermore in the Nauruan language), is sung by Rina Appi and Martin Detenamo
