= Nauruan =

Nauruan may refer to:

- Something of, from, or related to the country of Nauru
- Nauruan people, persons from Nauru, or of Nauruan descent
- Culture of Nauru
- Nauruan language
