= Naura =

Naura may refer to:

- Naura, India, a town in the Nawanshahr district of Punjab
- Naura Ayu (born 2005), Indonesian singer
- NAURA Technology Group, Chinese company that manufactures semiconductor chip production equipment
- Michael Naura (1934–2017), German jazz pianist, journalist and radio presenter; see German jazz § The 1960s
- Naura, a port city on the Malabar Coast of India
- Haigwai language or Naura, an Austronesian language, spoken in Papua New Guinea
- Narew (Lithuanian: Naura), a river in Poland

== See also ==
- Na'ura
- Nauru
- Nauru (disambiguation)
