= Education in Nauru =

Department of Education
- Minister: Asterio Appi

National education budget (2011–2012)
- Budget: 3,071,608 AUD
- Per student: 1000.20–1065.42 AUD^{A}

General details
- Primary languages: Nauruan and English
- System type: National

Literacy (2011)
- Total: 96.5
- Male: 95.7
- Female: 97.2

Enrollment (2013)
- Total: 3,196^{B}
- Primary: 1,475
- Secondary: 964
- Post secondary: 6^{C}

Attainment (2011)
- Secondary diploma: 91.2
- Post-secondary diploma: 4.9
- A The national budget for education was for 2011 and 2012. Funding figures were calculated by using the enrollment data from the 2011 and 2012 year. B Includes 751 pre-school students C Data from 2002

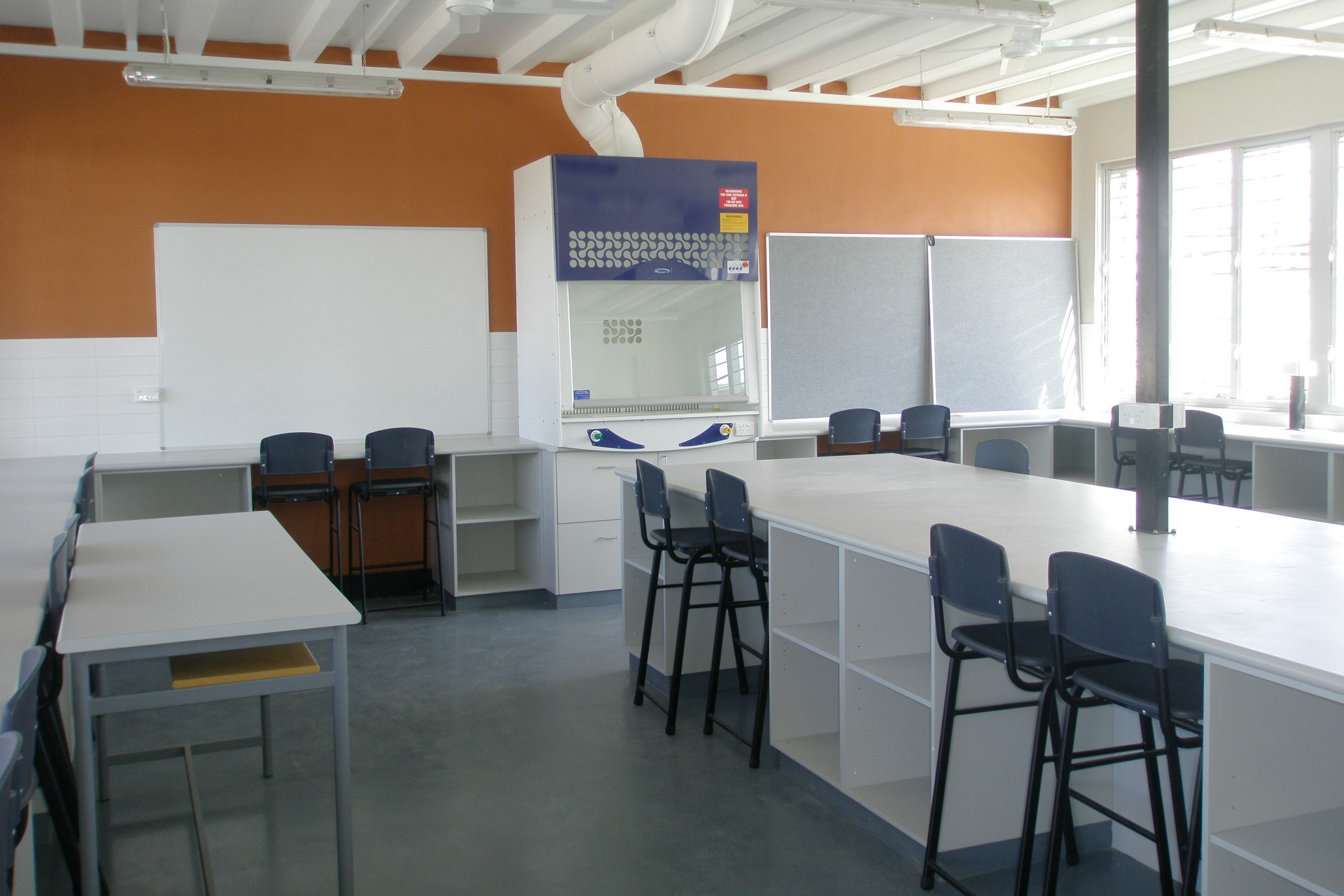
A classroom at Nauru Secondary School after refurbishment as part of an Australian aid package to the island state.

Education in Nauru is compulsory for children between the ages of 5 and 16. There are eleven schools in Nauru, including three primary schools and two secondary schools (Nauru College and Nauru Secondary School). There is an Able/Disable Centre for children with disabilities. Education at these schools is free. In 2011, the Australian Department of Foreign Affairs and Trade reported that 3,026 children were enrolled at Nauru's schools. The previous Minister for Education was the Hon. Charmaine Scotty, MP from 2013. The current Minister is Asterio Appi.

The Nauru Campus of the University of the South Pacific (USP) is located in Nauru Learning Village Yaren District since 2018, and was previously in Aiwo District. USP began teaching remote courses in the 1970s. A local campus was established in 1987. Courses of study focus on the fields of education and business. The campus also serves the broader community through a Continuing education programme.

Education in Nauru was first formalised by the work of Protestant missionaries in the early twentieth century. The first schools were established by missionary Philip Delaporte, teaching children literacy in the Nauru language. In 1923, the joint administration of the United Kingdom, Australia and New Zealand made education compulsory and established a curriculum based in the English language. Australia's AusAID funded an $11 million refurbishment of Nauru Secondary School beginning in late 2007. The project to assist in improving educational performance in Nauru was completed in 2010. Part of the project focused on enhancing Nauruan construction capacity.

The Human Rights Measurement Initiative (HRMI) finds that Nauru is fulfilling only 83.9% of what it should be fulfilling for the right to education based on the country's level of income. HRMI breaks down the right to education by looking at the rights to both primary education and secondary education. While taking into consideration Nauru's income level, the nation is achieving 93.5% of what should be possible based on its resources (income) for primary education but only 74.2% for secondary education.

== Schools ==
Public infant schools:

- Anetan Infant School – Anetan District
- Boe Infant School – Boe District
- Meneng Infant School – Meneng District
- Nibok Infant School – Nibok District

Public primary:

- Yaren Primary School – Yaren District – Years 1–3, Years 1 and 2 as of April 2002.
- Nauru Primary School – Meneng District – Years 4–6
  - The current building opened on 6 October 2016. Canstruct, an Australian firm, built the two-story building, which has eight classrooms. The building, specially designed for Nauruan weather, with ceiling fans and special airflow, may house up to 400 students and is resistant to natural disasters.
- Former: Aiwo Primary School – Aiwo District – Years 3 and 4 as of April 2002.

Public secondary:

- Nauru College – Denigomodu District – Years 7–9 as of June 2012, years 5–7 as of April 2002
  - Nauru College opened as the Denigomodu School in January 2000 as part of the Rehabilitation and Development Cooperation Agreement between Australia and Nauru, agreed in August 1993. As part of the agreement the governments decided to build Nauru College in March 1999. It was initially Nauru's third primary school, but it was transitioned into a junior high school with Form 1, as Nauruan children vie for scholarships at that educational stage.
- Nauru Secondary School – Yaren District – years 10–12; years 8–12 as of April 2002

Private:

- Kayser College – Ewa District – infant years-year 8; years 1–11 as of April 2002) – A new three classroom building opened on 8 May 2015. As of 2002 the Nauru Department of Education gives the school 80% of its funds. It is a Roman Catholic school.
- The Location School (years 1–8 as of April 2002) – Within the "Location" housing development in Denigomodu, for expatriate children This is the only school in Nauru which is not English medium.

Special schools:

- Able-Disable Centre in Meneng District

Former non-public:

- Nauru Regional Processing Centre had its own school, and the Australian government gave a contract in August 2013 to the organisation Save the Children to deliver a curriculum. By 2015 Australian authorities planned to move the students to local Nauruan government schools. That year the immigrants were moved to the local schools.
