= Alois Kayser =

German missionary (1877–1944)

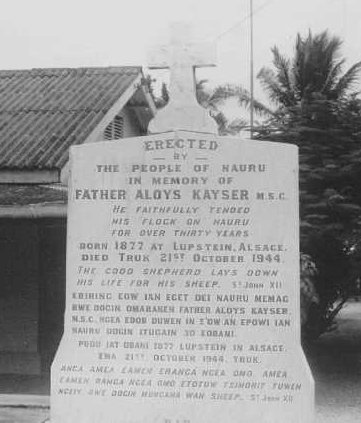
Cenotaph

Alois Kayser (March 29, 1877 in Lupstein, Alsace – October 21, 1944 in Chuuk) was a German-French Roman Catholic missionary who spent almost forty years on Nauru and wrote a Nauruan grammar (and possibly a Nauruan language dictionary). In 1943, he was deported along with Pierre Clivaz, a Swiss missionary, as well as most of the Nauruan population, by the Japanese to Truk Atoll in Micronesia, where he died.

In his honour, the government of Nauru named the technical school in the district Ewa after him.

== See also ==
- Philip Delaporte
