= Nauri =

Nauri can refer to:

- Nauruan language, also known as Nauri language
- Nauri (tribe), a Baloch tribe living in Iranian Balochistan
