= Culture of Nauru =

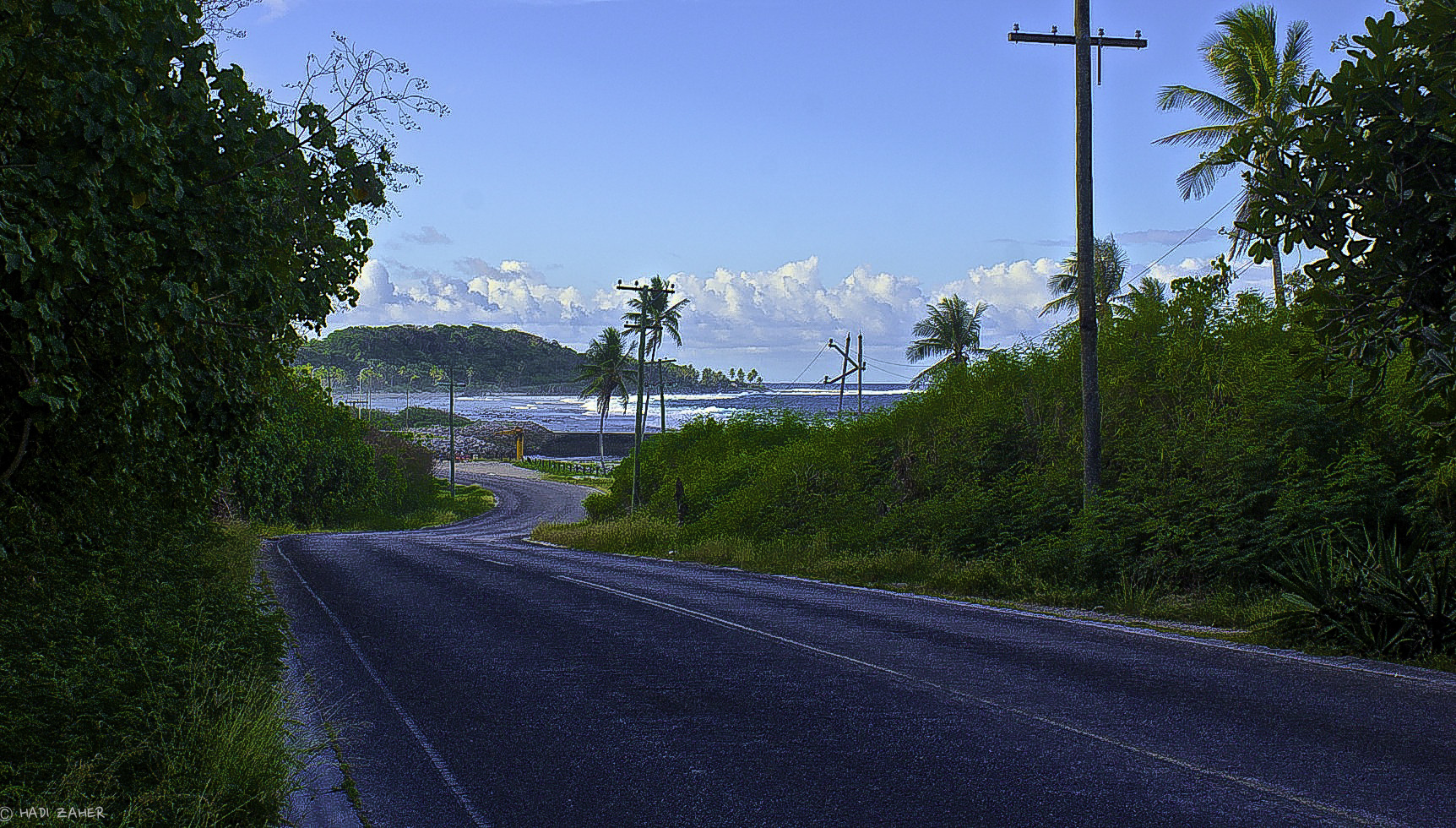
Island ring road in Nauru

The displacement of the traditional culture of Nauru by contemporary Western influences is evident on the island. Little remains from the old customs. The traditions of arts and crafts are nearly lost.

== Arts and crafts ==
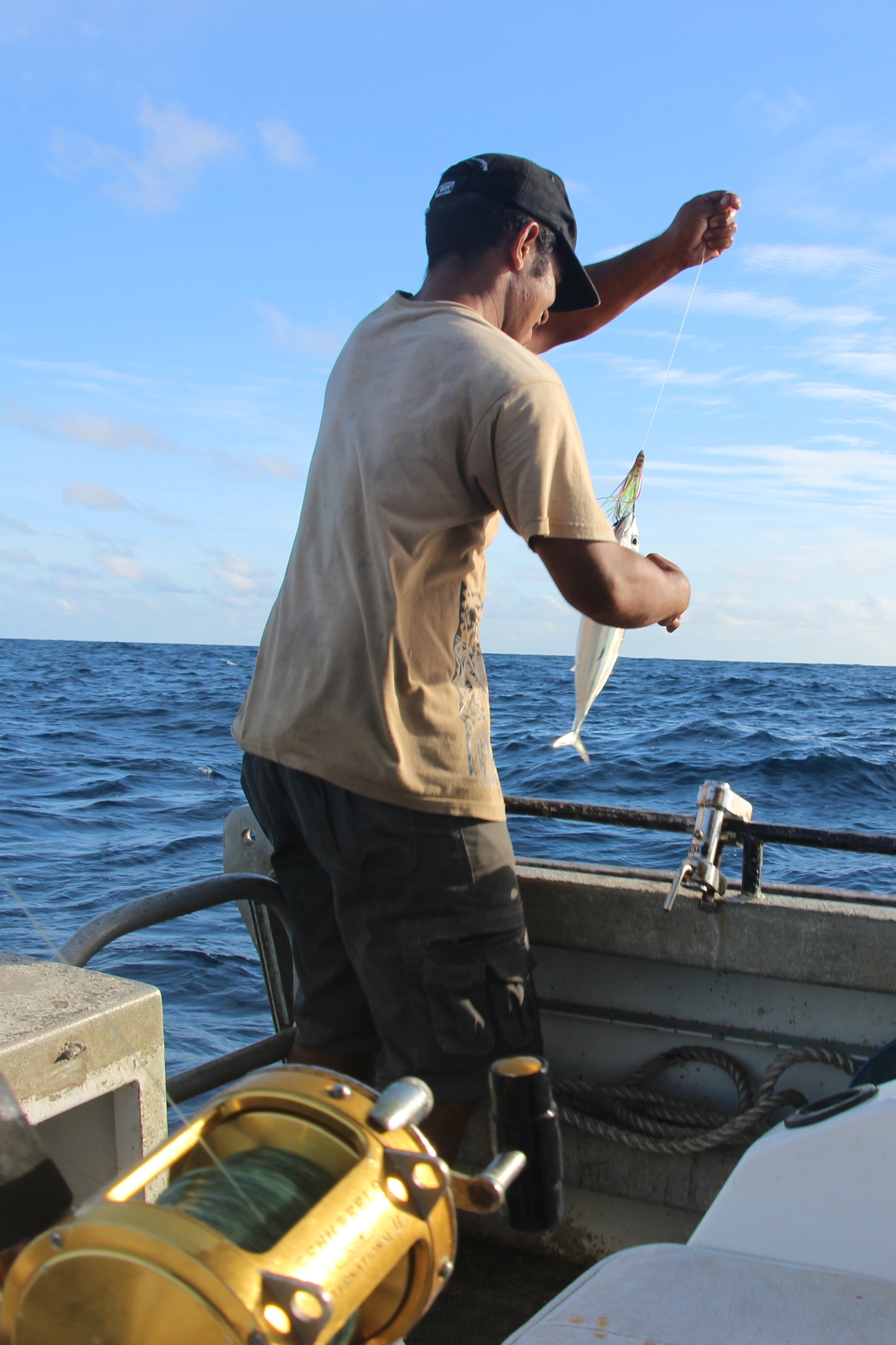
A Nauruan fisherman hauls in a catch

The inhabitants of Nauru wear the usual tropical clothes: short trousers and light shirts. Fishing still follows a traditional method: the island anglers wait in small light boats for fish to arrive. The custom of fishing by trained frigatebirds has been preserved.

Nauruan folk songs existed as of 1970, while Oh Bwio Eben Bwio is a noticeable folk song.

Whilst the traditional culture rapidly gives way to the contemporary, as elsewhere in Micronesia, music and dance still rank among the most popular art forms. Rhythmic singing and traditional reigen (Note: Indirectly influenced by German colonialism, reigen in this cultural context is a German word that implies styles of circular-moving dances in Nauru's historical past, implying that historical Nauruan traditional dances tend to be informal.) are performed particularly at celebrations. At least, a historical form of a Nauruan dance called fish dance in English was record in a form of photographs. Known contemporary dances are the frigate bird dance and the dogoropa.

Artisans create clothing items and fans from coconut fibers and pandanus leaves, using geometric patterns reminiscent of those found in Indonesian culture. Coconut wood is also used to craft handmade objects.

== Language and education ==
The language of Nauru, Dorerin Naoero, is a Micronesian language. English is understood and spoken widely.

Education is compulsory from 4 to 16, in all the schools on the island. The University of the South Pacific has a centre in Nauru located in the Aiwo District and offers pre-school teacher education, nutrition and disability studies and will offer the Community Workers Certificate. The campus offers Audio and video conferencing facilities, library and computer laboratory as well as internet and email access via USPNet are available for students. For secondary and university education, most Nauruans' children must go abroad. During its prosperous years these children were sent to Australia but now were sent to Fiji.

The official national holiday is the independence day on 31 January, but Angam Day, 26 October, is considered as an additional national holiday.

The Nauruan words of the national anthem were written by Margaret Hendrie and adopted in 1968 upon the Republic of Nauru's independence.

== Sport ==
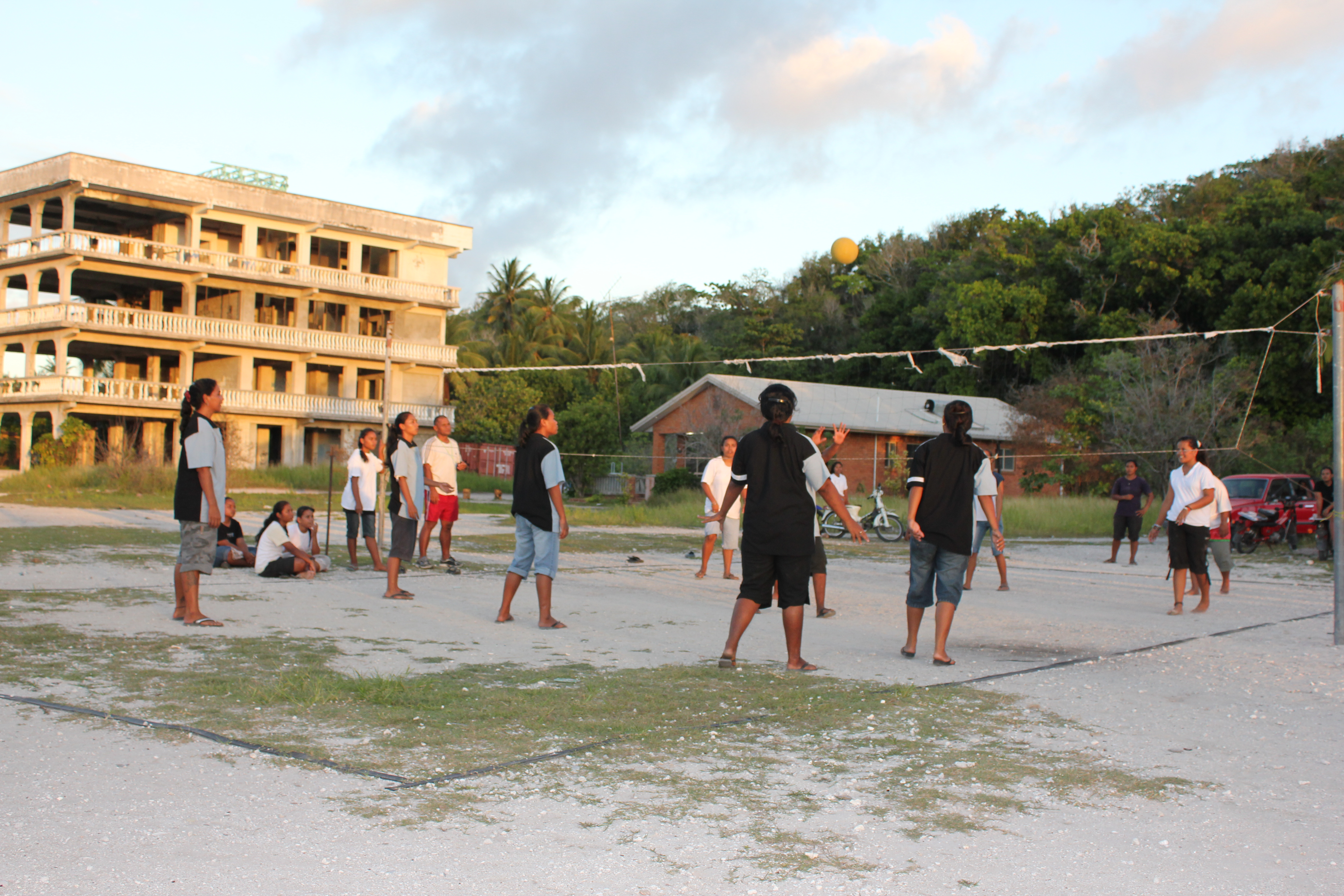
Local volleyball game in Nauru

The most popular in Nauru is Australian rules football. A 12-team senior league operates in the country, see Australian rules football in Nauru and it is a popular spectator sport. Nauru has competed internationally in Australian rules football at the Arafura Games, Australian Football International Cup and Barassi International Youth Tournament. The national team, the "Chiefs", ranked 8th in the International Cup in 2002 and gold medal at the Arafura Games.

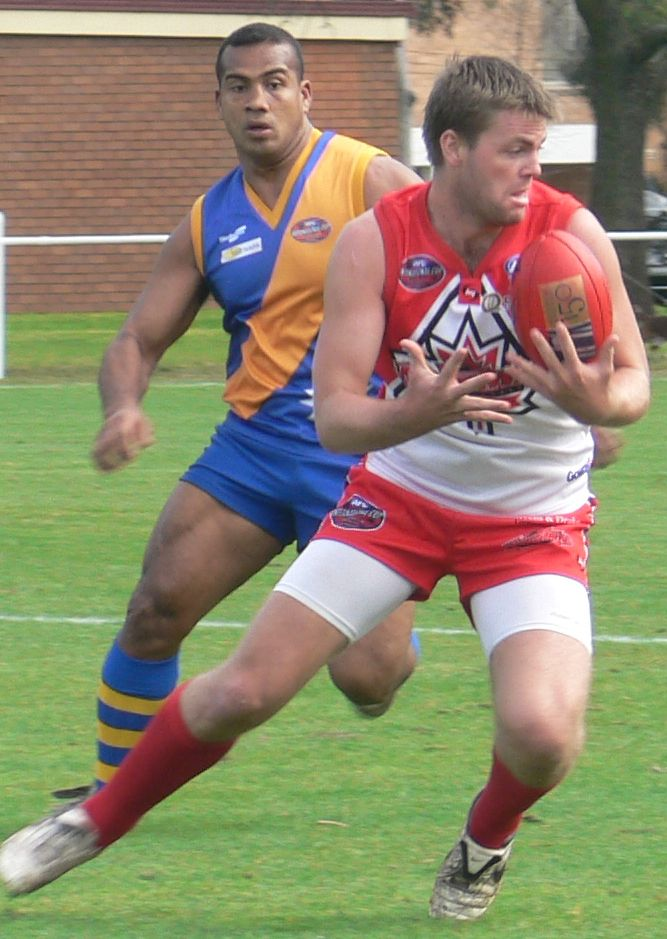
Australian Rules Football match (2008)

Nauru's national basketball team made the headlines internationally at the 1969 Pacific Games when it beat the Solomon Islands, which have almost 60 times of Nauru's population, and Fiji, which has almost 100 times of Nauru's population.

Nauruans also play soccer, softball, tennis, sailing, and swimming. Golf is accessible in Menen Hotel. There are only a few sport grounds in Nauru. The only stadium is in Yaren, but it is obsolete and fails to meet international standards. A larger and more modern sports stadium is being built in Meneng, however lack of money has caused the project to stall. The current stadia are:

- Aida Oval
- Denig Stadium in Denigomodu
- Linkbelt Oval in Aiwo
- Menen Stadium in Meneng
- National Stadium in Yaren

A traditional 'sport' is catching birds (Black Noddy) when they return from foraging at sea to the island towards sunset. The men then stand on the beach ready to throw their lasso. The Nauruan lasso is supple rope with a weight at the end. When a bird comes over they throw their lasso up, it hits and or drapes itself over the bird, which then falls down and is seized and are roosted as pets.

Eakabarere is a traditional form of Nauruan wrestling. Weightlifting is also one of the more traditional sports in Nauru.

== Radio ==
The island features in the 1941 radio play Drift.

== See also ==
- Nauruan cuisine
- Religion in Nauru
