= Telecommunications in Nauru =

Nauru has one government-owned radio station and two television stations, one of which is government owned. The island has telephone service under country code 674. The island's Internet service is provided by CenPacNet and Digicel Nauru. The country's ccTLD is .nr.

== Telephones ==
In 1994, there were 2,000 telephone land lines in use. There were 450 mobile cellular phones in use at the time. There were adequate local and international radiotelephone communications provided via Australian facilities. There is one satellite earth station, provided by Intelsat.

=== Telephone numbers in Nauru ===
The country code is +674, and the international call prefix is 00. There are seven other numbers in the system, with the format of numbers being +67433724411 or 0067433724411.

==== Telephone ranges ====
In August 2011, Criden Appi, the Director of Telecommunications (Regulatory), said that Nauru advises "only 556xxxx [x being any number from 1-9], 557xxxx, 558xxxx are in use for mobiles and there are no landlines in service".

===== Mobile telephone number ranges =====
Number range	Service
555 4111	
556 XYYY	
557 8226	
558 XYYY	
559 9386	
559 6085	

===== Fixed line area codes =====
Number range	Locality
444 XYYY	
888 XYYY	

===== Special Numbers =====
Service	Short code numbers
Police Emergency Service	110
Fire Emergency Service	112
Ambulance Emergency Service	111
Customer Care	123
Directory Enquiries	192

== Radio and television ==
As of 1998, there was 1 FM station, and no shortwave or AM stations. The FM station, Radio Nauru FM 105, is owned by the government. In 1997, there were 7,000 radios.

As of that year, there were 500 television sets. There are two television stations. One station is government-owned Nauru Television and mainly rebroadcasts British Broadcasting Corporation, the Australian Broadcasting Corporation and Television New Zealand, while the other is a private sports network.

== Internet ==
The country's ccTLD is .nr. Internet service in the country is provided by CenPacNet. Domains must be paid, and can be ordered from CenPacNet. The original configuration of the .nr TLD domain was performed by Shaun Moran of Australian ComTech Communications in 1998 as part of the first Internet connectivity on the island. There was a lengthy process with IANA to get the .nr domain approved and assigned at the time. The setup of .nr was done in 2002.

=== Internet censorship ===
In 2015, the Nauruan government blocked websites including Facebook as part of a crackdown on Internet pornography, especially child pornography. Opposition MP Mathew Batsiua has said that the Facebook ban is actually intended to stifle criticism of the government. The ban has now been lifted as of 2018.
