= Lupstein =

- Commune
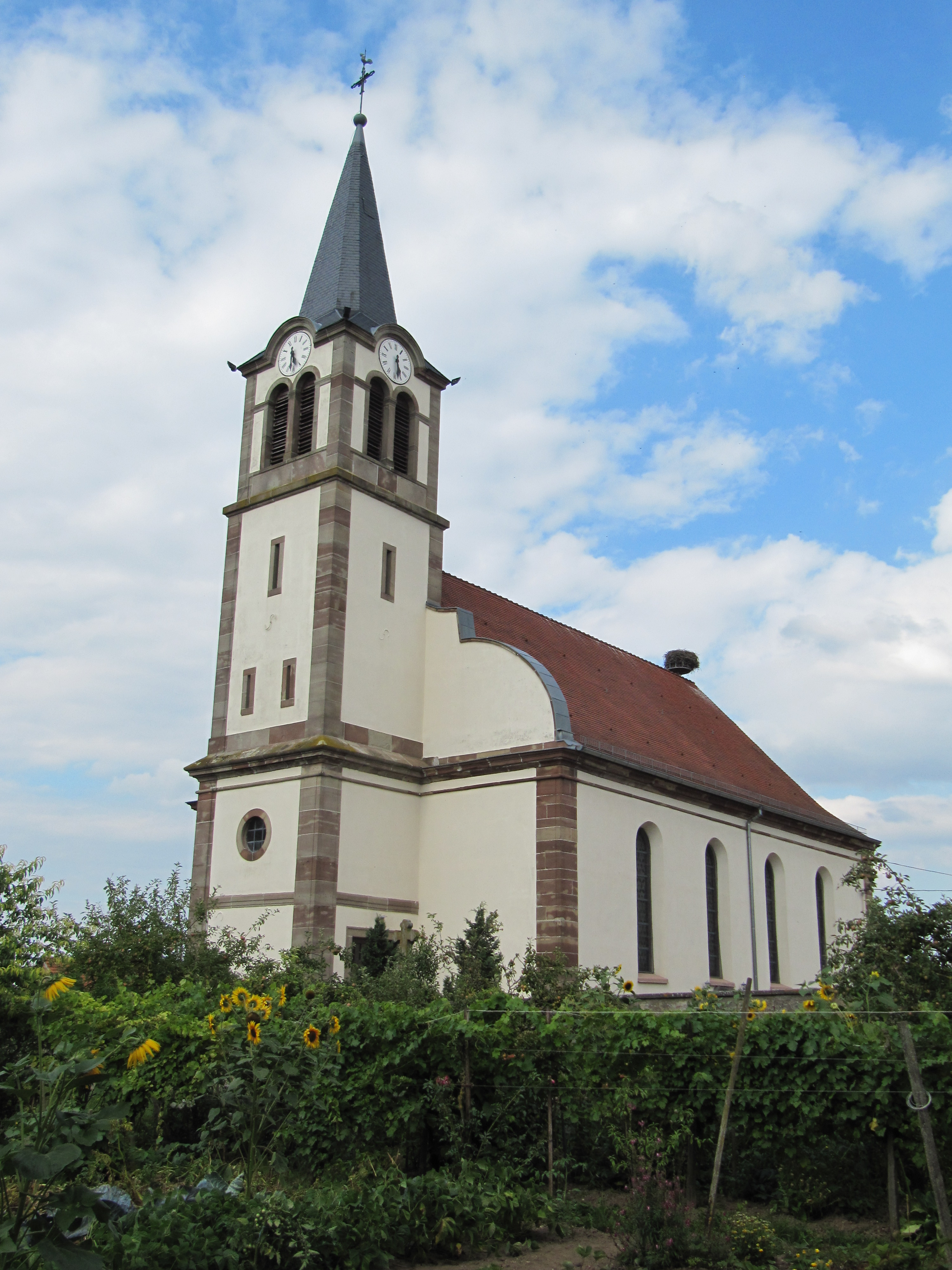
- The church in Lupstein

- Coat of arms
- Location of Lupstein
- Location within France Location within Grand Est
- Coordinates: 48°44′17″N 7°29′15″E
- Country: France
- Region: Grand Est
- Department: Bas-Rhin
- Arrondissement: Saverne
- Canton: Saverne

Government
  - Mayor (2020–2026): Denis Reiner
- Area^{1}: 7.82 km^{2} (3.02 sq mi)
- Highest elevation: 234 m (768 ft)
- Lowest elevation: 157 m (515 ft)
- Population (2023): 830
  - Density: 110/km^{2} (270/sq mi)
- Time zone: UTC+01:00 (CET)
  - Summer (DST): UTC+02:00 (CEST)
- INSEE/Postal code: 67275 /67490
- ^{1} French Land Register data, which excludes lakes, ponds, glaciers > 1 km^{2} (0.386 sq mi or 247 acres) and river estuaries.

Lupstein is a commune in the Bas-Rhin department in Grand Est in north-eastern France.

== People ==
- Alois Kayser, Catholic pastor who was active in Nauru, was born in Lupstein.

== See also ==
- Communes of the Bas-Rhin department
