= Mwinen Ko =

Nauruan community newspaper

Mwinen Ko (Nauruan for "Let's Talk About the Issues") is a Nauruan state-owned monthly community newspaper. It publishes articles on a wide array of subjects concerning Nauruan life, such as sports, politics, lifestyle, social events, the Nauruan diaspora, interviews, advertisements, births, classifieds and letters to the editor.

== History ==
It was established in 2010 (though the ABU and the government say it was established in 2009) with AusAID assistance and exclusively employs local staff. By early 2015, it was already in its 55th issue. Its active editor is Dominic Appi, who also works on Radio Nauru as a manager.

As of early 2017, an edition cost $1 at local retail outlets. Two other staff members at the newspaper at the time included Lilyann Taumea (advertising manager) and Cronisa Amwano (photographer and reporter). The milestone hundredth edition was published on 2 December 2021, the fourth to be issued digitally. By releasing digital issues, the newspaper surpassed issues that blocked the print publication for an unknown number of months.
