= Nauru Television =

State broadcaster of Nauru

- Type: Government-owned
- Founded: 1991
- Headquarters: Nauru
- Products: Television
- Owner: Government of Nauru
- Parent: Nauru Broadcasting Service; Nauru Media Bureau

Nauru Television (NTV), established on 31 May 1991, is the government-owned, non-commercial sole television company in the Republic of Nauru. It is operated by the Nauru Broadcasting Service and overseen by the Nauru Media Bureau.

== Specifics ==
Nauru Television broadcasts 24 hours a day. It operates a PAL-B colour service transmitted free-to-air through 1x10w and 2x100w transmitters.

Original plans to levy a fee per household were dropped, and NTV is funded by the government.

== Content ==
NTV's guiding policy upon launch called for it to present "a programme schedule that reflects and promotes cultural, educational, community and social interest in Nauru", and to have "a balance of programme types (news, current affairs, documentary, sports, adult and children’s comedy, drama, health, education, etc)." Local and international news would be covered, along with "major local sports and social events."

By the early 2000s, NTV exclusively broadcast content provided by the Australian Broadcasting Corporation, due to the country's dire economic situation and NTV's lack of a functioning camera. Its capacities were subsequently expanded with the assistance of AusAID. In 2002, UNESCO reported that NTV's "only locally produced programme is a popular daily half-hour news bulletin produced by NTV personnel in the S-VHS format. Local news items are shot utilising three field cameras which double as studio fixtures for post production."

NTV broadcasts both in Nauruan and in English.

== History ==
Before selecting the New Zealand-backed proposal, there were two further bids from Japan's NEC and Australia's OTCI, but were rejected on the grounds that they were expensive. A proposed cable television network was also mooted, it too was also deemed expensive.

Television broadcasting in Nauru was inaugurated on 31 May 1991, with regular transmissions beginning the following day, 1 June 1991. Covering the majority of the island, the initial duration of broadcasts was approximately five hours per day.

NTV operated as a subscription service in its early years, charging AU$500, AU$80-100 for the installation of an antenna and AU$50 for a monthly reception fee. In 1993, NTV it had 219 subscribers, with the aim of selling 500 decoders to achieve self-sufficiency.

Initially, Television New Zealand were contracted to provide both technical facilities and basic operational training to local employees. Transmitted via satellite or through the regular transportation of videotapes from New Zealand, content consisted of American and New Zealand television programmes. This arrangement continued until 1995 when costs dictated a shift to alternative sources of programme content, specifically that bought in from the Australian Broadcasting Corporation.

=== Four Corners issue ===
In 2004, the government of President Ludwig Scotty, seeking re-election, ordered Nauru Television to broadcast the Australian Broadcasting Corporation's Four Corners programme on past economic mismanagement under former President Rene Harris, every evening during the week before the election. Harris complained that NTV "had refused to give him equal time to present his side of the story." Scotty was re-elected.
