= Laurence Henry Hicks =

English-Australian composer, military bandmaster (1912–1997)

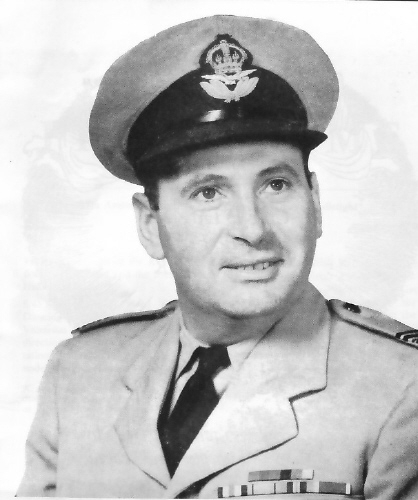
Laurence Henry Hicks

Laurence Henry Hicks OBE (1912 – 21 April 1997) was an English-born military bandmaster and composer. He migrated to Australia in 1952 after having served in World War II with both the British Army's Black Watch and the Fourth Canadian Armoured Division's military bands. From April 1952 onward, Hicks was the first Director of Music for the Royal Australian Air Force (RAAF). On 1 January 1963, he was appointed to The Order of the British Empire – Officer (Military) with the citation, "For service as Director of Music with the RAAF". In preparation for the 1968 independence of Nauru, Hicks composed music for the national anthem "Nauru Bwiema", with lyrics by Nauruan writer Margaret Hendrie. He was Squadron Leader of the Central Band which performed on 31 January at the independence ceremony in Nauru.

== Biography ==
Laurence Hicks was born in 1912 in London to a father who was a clarinet player in the British Army. At the age of 14 years, he was a band boy for the Cameronian Scottish Rifles. The following year he attended Royal Military School of Music at Kneller Hall learning the clarinet and cello. He subsequently joined the Cameronian Scottish Rifles as a clarinetist and toured Egypt for two years and then India. He returned to study at Kneller Hall undertaking a bandmaster course and graduated in 1938. Hicks was appointed to the Black Watch and served with them at the outset of World War II. From 1940 to 1941 he taught woodwind instruments at Kneller Hall. The following year, he trained a military band for the Canadian Army, and in 1944 took part in the allied invasion of Europe with the Fourth Canadian Armoured Division. In mid-June 1944, the Royal Canadian Ordnance Corps Band performed at Normandy, Hicks recalled "we were mobbed by the troops particularly after we played the 'Colonel Bogey March' which everyone enjoyed". After the war he rejoined the Black Watch band and performed in India, Germany, Denmark, Sweden and Britain.

In January 1951, his band recorded Black Watch Military Band (Royal Highland Regiment) Conducted by Bandmaster Laurence H. Hicks, which included a composition by Hicks, "Jubilee March". The following month they toured Australia and New Zealand. In April 1952 he was appointed the inaugural Director of Music for the Royal Australian Air Force (RAAF) and re-established the Central Band. He recruited new members and designed the band's uniform. By March 1956 the Central Band were practising every national anthem for the forthcoming Summer Olympics in Melbourne. On 1 January 1963, Hicks was awarded The Order of the British Empire – Officer (Military), "in recognition of his loyal and valuable service", with the citation "For service as Director of Music with the RAAF".

In preparation for the 1968 independence of Nauru, Hicks composed music for the national anthem, "Nauru Bwiema", with lyrics by Nauran writer, Margaret Hendrie. He was Squadron Leader of the RAAF Central Band which performed on 31 January at the independence ceremony in Nauru.

In about 1938, Hicks married and by 1956 the couple had three children. Hicks died in 1997 aged 84-85, and in 1998, the Nauru Philatelic Bureau issued stamps to commemorate the 30th year of independence, including two acknowledging Hicks’ role.

== See also ==
- Music of Nauru
- Music of Micronesia
