= Nauru Secondary School =

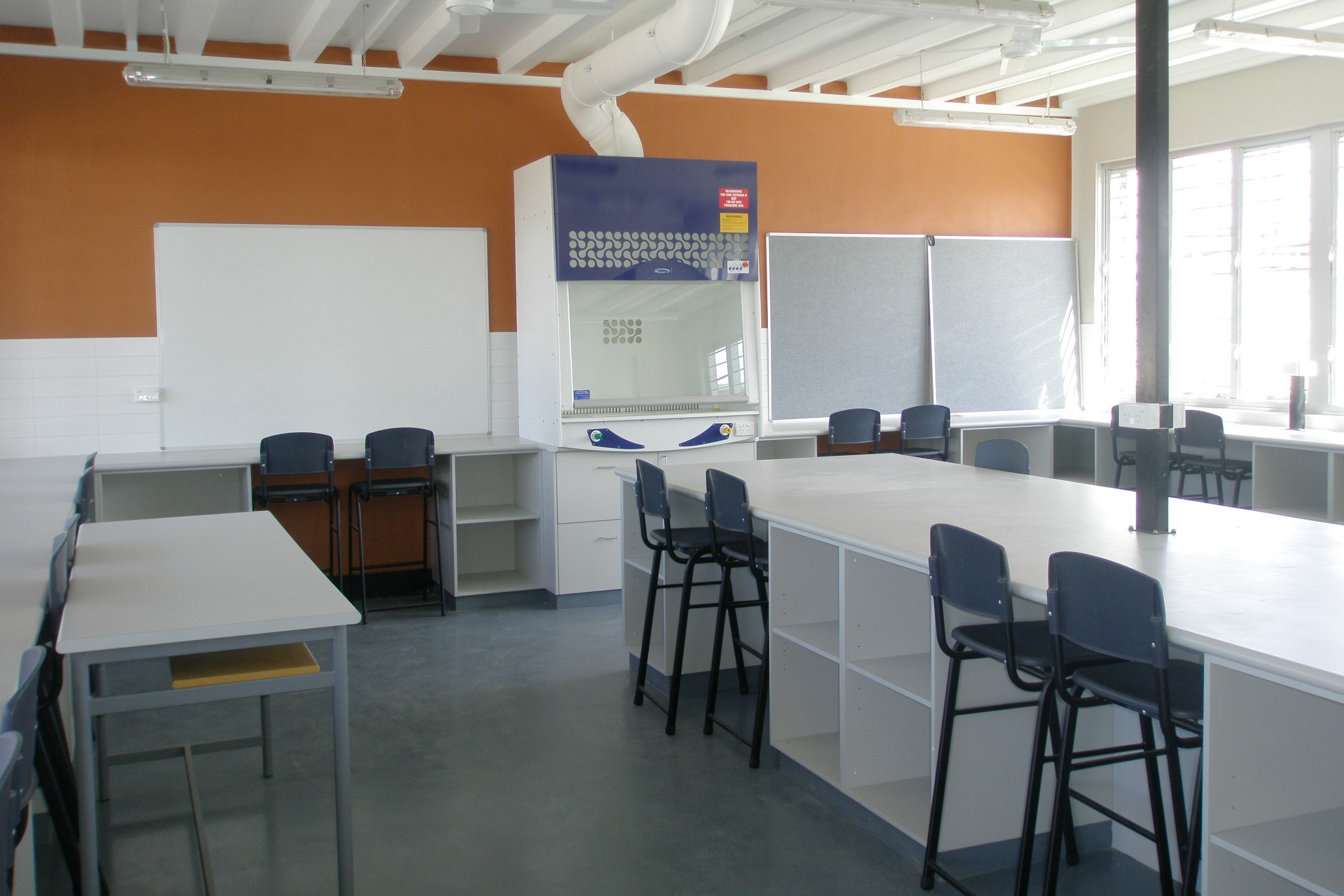
- A classroom at Nauru Secondary School after refurbishment as part of an Australian aid package to the island state

Location
- Yaren District; Nauru; 0°32′46″S 166°54′56″E

Information
- Type: Public secondary school
- Oversight: Government of Nauru
- Years offered: 8–12

Nauru Secondary School (abbreviated as NSS) is an upper public secondary school in the Yaren District, Nauru, located in the Nauru Learning Village, along with the University of the South Pacific Nauru Campus and the Nauru Technical & Vocational Education Training Centre.

The school served years 10–12 and had the final stages of secondary education in Nauru. As of 2002 it served years 8 through 12. It uses the curriculum of Queensland, Australia.

In the 1950s it served grades 4 and 5, and a new building opened in 1954. Reuben Kun, who wrote an article about Nauru's university system, stated that in that period there was an unanticipated increase in the number of students at the school. The school had classes teaching Nauruan circa the 1960s and 1970s. In 2013 it became a Queensland Recognised School.

Nauru Secondary has a library.

== See also ==
- Education in Nauru
