= Nauruan navigational system =

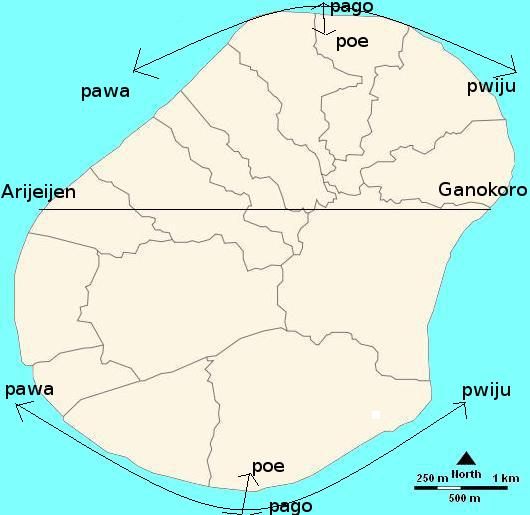
A map of Nauru describing the Nauruan navigational system

The Nauruan navigational system is a way of expressing direction, similar to North, South, East and West, but limitations in the system mean that it is unable to be used outside of Nauru. The system is constructed using two main points, Ganokoro and Arijejen. Ganokoro stands for a place in Nauru that was considered a place of sunrise, and Arijejen was a place of sunset on the island. Arijejen was close to the place that once hosted a cemetery of the Chinese settlements of the island. The four main directions are pago, poe, Pawa (Apwewa) and Pwiju (apwijiuw). The word Apuwijiuw was generally translated as "eastwards", and stands for a direction towards Ganokoro, whereas the word Apwewa is translated as "westwards", and stands for a direction towards Arijejen. The word pago stands for a direction towards the beach (as in the coast of the island) and poe stands for the direction towards the inland of the island, and the words are used in the form rodu apago and roga apoe.
