= Football in Nauru =

Football in Nauru is played according to three codes: Australian rules football, association football, and rugby union.

== Australian rules football in Nauru ==
Australian rules football is the national sport of Nauru. It is the most popular sport in the country.

== Association football ==
Soccer in Nauru is a minor sport.

== Rugby union ==
Rugby union in Nauru is a minor but growing sport.

== See also ==
- Culture of Nauru § Sport
