= Drift (radio play) =

Drift is a 1941 Australian radio play by Thomas Wainwright.

Gilchrist was a sailor and based the play on his own experiences on a route to Nauru. He wrote a number of short stories over the years. His other radio plays included You'll Write to Irene and The Pilgrimmage.

Leslie Rees called it, and Gilchrist's Aphrodite, among the best plays of the year.

== Premise ==
"Drift gives a graphic pictures of the "nerves' on board a ship drifting day after day on the equatorial current of the phosphate island of Nauru, and culminating in death and mutiny. Written by a man who has him-self sailed the seven seas and commanded his own ship, Drift has the authentic ring and flavor of life aboard a tramp steamer."
