= Nauru, Tanzania =

Tanzanian village

Nauru
- Village
- Location within Tanzania
- Coordinates: 11°08′S 38°37′E
- Country: Tanzania
- Region: Mtwara
- District: Nanyumbu
- Time zone: UTC+3:00 (EAT)

Nauru is a small village in the Nanyumbu District, Mtwara Region, Tanzania. It has no roads and lies close to two tributaries of the Ruvuma River, and the border with Mozambique. The village is served by the Nauru primary school.
