= Nauru Bwiema =

National anthem of Nauru

English: Nauru, Our Homeland
- National anthem of Nauru
- Lyrics: Margaret Hendrie
- Music: Laurence Henry Hicks
- Adopted: 1968; 58 years ago

Audio sample
- Digital instrumental version: file; help

Band instrumental version

"Nauru Bwiema" (Nauruan pronunciation: [n̪ʌˈuru bˠiˈɛmʲæ]; English: "Nauru, Our Homeland") is the national anthem of Nauru. The lyrics were written by Margaret Hendrie, with music composed by Laurence Henry Hicks. It was adopted in 1968, upon attaining independence from the mostly Australian-administered UN Trusteeship.

== History ==
The anthem was composed by Anglo-Australian composer and military bandmaster Laurence Henry Hicks, who was leader of the Black Watch Band. It was adopted upon independence from the UN Trust Territory of Nauru, which was mostly administered by Australia, in January 1968. The anthem did not have official lyrics at the time, but lyrics by Nauruan composer Margaret Griffith Hendrie (1935–1990) were later adopted.

== Lyrics ==
Nauruan original

Nauru bwiema, ngabena ma auwe.
Ma dedaro bwe dogum, ma otota bet egom.
Atsin ngago bwien okor, ama bagadugu
Epoa ngabuna ri nan orre bet imur.
Ama memag ma nan epodan eredu won engiden,
Miyan aema ngeiyin ouge:
Nauru eko dogin!

IPA transcription (Note: See Help:IPA and Nauruan language § Phonology.)

[ˈn̪ʌ̯u.ru bˠi.ˈɛ.mʲæ ŋæ.ˈbʲɛ.n̪ɑ mʲæ ˈæ̯u.wɛ]
[mʲæ d̪ɛ.ˈd̪ɑ.ro bˠɛ d̪ʌ.ˈgɨmˠ mʲæ o.ˈt̪ˢo.t̪ˢɑ bʲɛt̪ ɛ.ˈgʌmˠ]
[æ.ˈsɪn̪ ˈŋɑ.go bˠi.ˈɛn̪ ʌ.ˈkʌr ˈæ.mʲæ bˠɑ.gæ.ˈd̪u.gu]
[ɛ.ˈpˠo.æ ŋæ.ˈbˠɨ(w).n̪ɑ ri n̪ɑn̪ ˈʌr.rɛ bʲɛt̪ i.ˈmˠɨr]
[ˈæ.mʲæ mʲɛ.ˈmʲæg mʲæ n̪ɑn̪ ɛ.pˠo.ˈd̪ɑn̪ ɛ.ˈrɛ.d̪u wʌn̪ ɛ.ŋi.ˈd̪ɛn̪]
[mʲɪ.ˈʝæn̪ æ.ˈ(j)ɛ.mʲæ ŋɛ̯ɪ.ˈʝɪn̪ ˈʌ̯u.gɛ]
[ˈn̪ʌ̯u.ru ˈɛ.ko d̪o.ˈgɪn̪]

English translation

Nauru our homeland, the land we dearly love.
We all pray for you and we also praise your name.
Since long ago, you have been the home of our great forefathers
And will be, for generations, yet to come.
We all join in together to honour your flag,
And we shall rejoice together and say:
Nauru forevermore!

Official English translation

Nauru our home, our beloved people
We pray for you, we behold your name
You have always been home to our ancestors
and to those who come after them

And in our own words we will say
Nauru forever

== See also ==
- Flag of Nauru
