= Eakabarere =

Eakabarere is a traditional form of wrestling in Nauru, which has been described as being similar to judo.

== Format ==
Traditionally, bouts were arranged when a group of young men from one district challenged those from another. On the day of the bout, participants fast until the event. They wear an ankle length double mat, and are rubbed with coconut oil to make them less easy to grip.

Bouts take place in an open field and are refereed by an aman etan. One participant walks into the centre of the field and chooses their opponent from the opposing district. After covering their hands with dust, hands are slapped on thighs to start the bout. This begins with the two participants gripping each other and searching for a better hold in order to throw their opponent. When evenly matched, bouts may descend into attacks including biting, at which point they are separated by the aman etan.

A master wrestler losing a bout is referred to as ekaowen agen ("he has no name any more").

A group of female wrestlers would traditionally tour the island once a year.

== Rules ==
The rules of the sport include:

- Participants may not hit their opponent in the neck during the first bout
- Participants may not trip their opponent
- Participants may not pull the mat, lower body or legs
- The bout is lost by the participant that touches the ground with any part of their body other than their feet.
