= Margaret Hendrie =

Nauruan writer of the national anthem (1935–1990)

Margaret Hendrie (née Griffith, 1935–2023) lived in Melbourne, Victoria, Australia. Hendrie entered competition and wrote the Nauruan language lyrics for "Nauru Bwiema", the country's national anthem. In preparation for the country's independence ceremonies celebrated in 1968, Hendrie's lyrics were adapted to music composed by the Australian musician Laurence Henry Hicks.
