= Nauru Broadcasting Service =

- Type: Broadcast television radio
- Founded: 1968 (radio); 1991 (television)
- Headquarters: Nauru
- Area served: Nationwide
- Owner: Nauru Media Bureau
- Subsidiaries: Nauru Television; Radio Nauru

The Nauru Broadcasting Service is the state-owned, non-commercial broadcasting service of the Republic of Nauru.

Founded in 1968, when the country obtained independence, the NBS operates Nauru Television and Radio Nauru.

By the early 2000s, in a context of economic difficulties, the NBS was producing no local content, but rebroadcast programmes from the British Broadcasting Corporation, the Australian Broadcasting Corporation and Television New Zealand. Nauru TV possessed no functioning cameras, and Nauru Radio's broadcast signals were too weak to be heard throughout the small country. The NBS's capacities were subsequently enhanced with the assistance of AusAID, and by the late 2000s it was broadcasting locally made programmes across the island.
