= News Corp (disambiguation) =

News Corp is a company spun off from the original News Corporation.

News Corp may also refer to:

- News Corporation, an American multinational mass media corporation operated and owned by Rupert Murdoch in 1980–2013
- News Corp Australia

== See also ==
- Fox Corporation (2019–present), the legal successor to the 21st Century Fox
- List of assets owned by News Corp
- List of assets owned by 21st Century Fox
- News UK, the British subsidiary of News Corp
- 21st Century Fox (2013–2019), the legal successor to the original News Corporation
