= Arijejen =

- Village
- Interactive map of Arijejen
- Coordinates: 0°31′33″S 166°54′44″E
- Country: Nauru
- District: Denigomodu

Population (2012)
  - Total: 2,381

Arijejen is a village located in Denigomodu district, Nauru. The population of the village as of 2012 is 2,381.
