= Transport in Nauru =

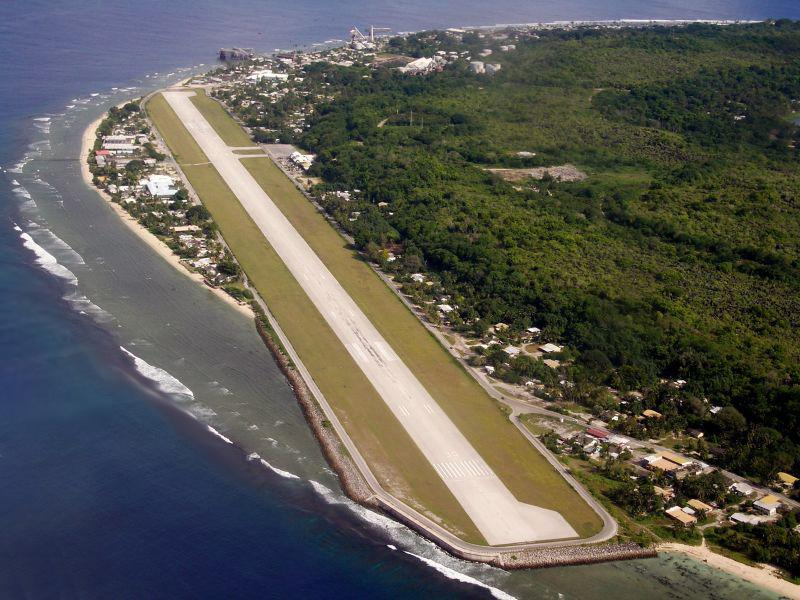
View of Nauru International Airport

Transport in Nauru includes pedestrian, bicycle, automobile, train, and airplane. There is no harbour or port as of the 2020s, as the island is surrounded by a rocky coral reef, however an international port is currently under construction.

== Ocean ==
The Nauru International Port which is currently under construction on Nauru in the Pacific Ocean. It will become the country's first international seaport and improve commerce and connectivity for the island nation.

== Air ==
Nauru has one airport, Nauru International Airport. Nauru Airlines, which flies to Brisbane, Australia; Majuro, Marshall Islands; Kiritimati; Palau; Nadi, Fiji; Pohnpei, Federated States of Micronesia and Tarawa, Kiribati, is the only airline to fly to the airport. There are seven airplanes in service, three of which are reserved for freight.

The airport has one runway and a compact terminal that handles both passenger and cargo operations. It is also occasionally used by government and medical evacuation flights.

== Rail ==
Rail transport is used for moving phosphate from the island's interior to the cantilever jetties on the island's western coast, in Aiwo district. For this purpose, a 3,900-metre (12,800 ft) long, 610 mm (2 ft) narrow-gauge railway was built by the Pacific Phosphate Company in 1907.

The line was later expanded with additional branches to newly developed mining areas, and in the 1960s older rolling stock was replaced with diesel locomotives to increase transport capacity. The network played a key role during Nauru's peak phosphate production era, contributing significantly to the country's economy. After phosphate reserves declined in the late 20th century, operations decreased and maintenance was reduced. Remnants of the railway and several locomotives remain visible today, occasionally used for small-scale transport and as points of interest for visitors to the mining sites.

== Road ==
The island has about 30 km (18 miles) of road, and traffic drives on left side of road. Island Ring Road is the main road on the island, going around the entire exterior of the island.

Most smaller settlements, shops, and schools are located along this circular route, giving it an important role in daily life. The interior of the island has few developed roads due to old mining sites, leaving transportation there limited.
