= Radio Nauru =

- Nauru
- Frequency: 88 MHz

Programming
- Languages: Nauruan, English
- Format: News, Music

Ownership
- Owner: Nauru Broadcasting Service

History
- First air date: 1968; 58 years ago

Technical information
- Power: 500 watts

Links
- Webcast: http://radionauru.nr:8000/live
- Website: http://radionauru.nr/

Radio Nauru, established in 1968, is a government-owned, non-commercial sole radio station in the Republic of Nauru. Owned by Nauru Broadcasting Service, it broadcasts on 88 MHz FM and operates from Mondays to Sundays 6:00 AM to 11:00 PM. Radio Nauru offers program of traditional culture, news, information, and classical and modern music, as well as island music. It carries programs of Radio Australia and BBC.

Radio Nauru announcers predominantly speak Nauruan on air, although the general programming is dominated by English-language media.
