= .nr =

Internet country-code top level domain for Nauru

- Introduced: 30 March 1998
- TLD type: Country code top-level domain
- Status: Active
- Registry: CenpacNet
- Sponsor: CenpacNet
- Intended use: Entities connected with Nauru
- Actual use: Low usage
- Registration restrictions: .gov.nr and .edu.nr are restricted to appropriate institutions in Nauru; otherwise unrestricted
- Structure: Names can be registered directly at second level or at third level under various categories
- Documents: Registration agreement
- Dispute policies: UDRP
- Registry website: CenpacNet

.nr is the Internet country code top-level domain (ccTLD) for Nauru. Domains must be paid, and can be ordered from CenpacNet, Nauru's Internet service provider.

The original configuration of the .nr TLD domain was performed by Shaun Moran of ComTech Communications (Australia) in 1998 as part of the first Internet connectivity on the island. There was a lengthy process with IANA to get the .nr domain approved and assigned at the time. The setup of .nr was done in 2002 by Franck Martin using specific custom code.

== Second-level domains ==
In addition to the 2nd level direct domains which the registry offers, these are the official second-level domains under which third-level registrations are offered by the registry:

Domain	Restrictions
.com.nr	Unrestricted
.net.nr	Unrestricted
.org.nr	Unrestricted
.edu.nr	Restricted to educational entities in Nauru
.gov.nr	Restricted to government entities in Nauru
.biz.nr	Unrestricted
.info.nr	Unrestricted

== Usage outside of Nauru ==
The .nr domain has low usage outside of Nauru. However, when it is used, it can be found on web domains utilising domain hacks, such as hdm.nr (Headminer), domai.nr (Domainr) or exo.nr (Exonar).

From 2002 to 2018, a domain service freedomain.pro offered free subdomain hosting under the unofficial subdomain "co.nr". As of 1 May 2018, issues with the .nr registry and Nauruan government caused the entire .co.nr domain to shut down and its subdomains to stop functioning.

== See also ==
- Telecommunications in Nauru
