= Philip Delaporte =

American lexicographer and missionary (c. 1868–1928)

Reverend Philip Adam Delaporte (c. 1868 – November 1928) was a German-born American Protestant missionary who ran a mission on Nauru with his wife from 1899 until 1915. During this time he translated numerous texts from German into Nauruan including the Bible and a hymnal. He was also one of the first to create a written form for the Nauruan dialect, published in a Nauruan-German dictionary.

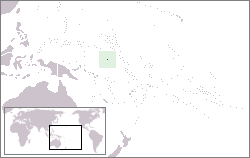
Location of Nauru in the Micronesian South Pacific

== Early life ==
Delaporte was born in Worms, Grand Duchy of Hesse (now Germany), around the year 1868. At the age of 14, he immigrated to the United States. After being ordained, Delaporte worked on Butaritari with support from the Elim Mission in Los Angeles, California, U.S.

Delaporte and his wife, Salome, also a missionary, had five children. The eldest daughter was born in the U.S. The others, Paul, Mabel, Phillip, and Margaret, were born on Nauru. They were thought to be among the first white children born in the Marshall Islands.

== Missionary ==
Germany annexed Nauru in 1888 as part of its Imperial German Pacific Protectorate, and German government administrators arrived in 1906, after the discovery of phosphate on the island. A Gilbertese pastor named Tabuia had founded the Nauru mission approximately 10 years before the Delaportes' arrival, but withdrew in 1892 at the request of the German government, leaving a small core of Nauruan Christians.

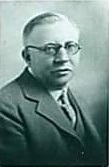
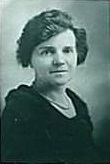
Philip and Salome Delaporte, c. 1906.

Delaporte and his family were sent to Nauru in 1899 by the Central Union Church of Honolulu to work under the auspices of the American Board of Commissioners for Foreign Missions in Micronesia. They took over management of the mission and its associated school, the only formal educational institution on the island. Delaporte gained the trust of the Nauruans by carrying out medical work (because there was no doctor on the island) and by teaching. The school taught reading, writing, arithmetic, geography, German, singing, and Bible history.

The Delaportes encouraged the Nauruans to dress in a more Western style including Mother Hubbard dresses, singlets (sleeveless shirt or vest), and Lavalavas (simple skirt). Polygyny was no longer allowed and traditional Nauruan dances were discouraged.

When the Pacific Phosphate Company gained control of Phosphate mining in Nauru in 1906, Delaporte was able to take advantage of the company's informal connections with the London Missionary Society (LMS) to benefit the mission. For example, the LMS assisted in acquiring printing machinery in Sydney, Australia, and the machinery was shipped to Nauru in cooperation with the mining company.

== German to Nauruan translations ==
In 1907, Delaporte published a pocket German-Nauruan dictionary, Taschenwörterbuch Deutsch-Nauru (German-Nauruan Dictionary). The book contained an orthography, developed by Delaporte, consisting of 32 characters: b, p, d, t, g, k, q, j, r, w, m, n, ñ, c, f, h, l, s, z, i, e, a, à, â, o, ò, ô, ö, u, ù, û, and ü. The dictionary was nearly 100 pages, with 65 devoted to a glossary and a dozen to alphabetically arranged phrases in German and Nauruan. About 1650 German words appear in the dictionary, along with about 1300 'unique' Nauruan forms (excluding diacritical marks).

With help from his wife and a Nauruan convert named Timothy Detudamo, Delaporte translated many religious texts from German to Nauruan including the Bible, a catechism, a hymn book, a history of the Christian Church, and a book designed for use in the school. In 1915, when Delaporte returned to the U.S., he brought with him manuscript copies of the Bible and a hymnal in Nauruan. With assistance from Detudamo, who had accompanied Delaporte, these were published by the American Board press.

== Leaving Nauru ==
The Delaportes returned to the United States several times during their tenure in Nauru, to work on publication of Philip's translations and to visit their children who were in school in the U.S. They visited Boston in 1907, and in 1911 they went on furlough because Salome Delaporte was in poor health.

In 1914, control of Nauru switched to Great Britain. Also in 1914, the Missionary Herald printed a letter that Delaporte wrote early in the war in which he expressed sympathy for Germany, the country of his birth. This letter came to the attention of the British authorities on Nauru. While the Delaportes were in the U.S. in 1915, the British administrator wrote to the American Board stating that Delaporte was no longer welcome on the island. Delaporte was placed in charge of a German congregation in Muscatine, Iowa, U.S.

Delaporte died in November 1928 in Gridley, Illinois, at age 60.

== Sources ==
- ABCFM Board (1911). Annual report of the American Board of Commissioners for Foreign Missions. Vol. 101–104. American Board of Commissioners for Foreign Missions.
