= Australia–Nauru relations =

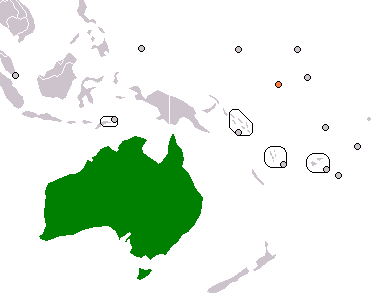

- Australia: Nauru

Foreign relations exist between Australia and Nauru. Australia administered Nauru as a dependent territory from 1914 to 1968 and has remained one of Nauru's foremost economic and aid partners thereafter. Nauru has a High Commission in Canberra and a consulate-general in Brisbane. Australia is one of only two countries to have a High Commission in Nauru. Both countries are members of multilateral institutions such as the Commonwealth of Nations and the Pacific Islands Forum.

== History ==
Nauru was a German colony between 1888 and 1914, and was administratively attached with Germany's other Micronesian colony the Marshall Islands. During the late 19th century, there was a boom in the copra industry in Nauru and the rest of Micronesia, and in 1887 all 10 white residents living on Nauru were involved in the copra industry. By the late 19th century, Australian traders were exchanging their goods for copra with the natives on several Micronesian islands, including islands which now make up the modern-day nations of the Marshall Islands, Kiribati and the Federated States of Micronesia. At the start of the 1900s, Australians became aware of the phosphate reserves on Nauru. The existence of phosphate on both Nauru and Banaba (now part of Kiribati) was confirmed on a trip by Australian-born New Zealander Albert Fuller-Ellis. Ellis managed phosphate mines on Nauru between 1906 and 1911.

Australia seized the island from Germany during World War I, with Nauru being surrendered to H.M.A.S. Melbourne on September 9, 1914. However, it wasn't occupied by Australia until November of that year. Britain, Australia and New Zealand were given a joint League of Nations Mandate over Nauru in 1920, but the island was administered by Australia. Australians introduced Australian Rules Football to the natives during the 1910s, which eventually became the national sport of Nauru in 1968.

On August 26, 1942, Japan captured the island as part of World War II and put over 1,000 natives on forced labor camps, including on Chuuk (now part of the Federated States of Micronesia). Japan agreed to surrender from World War II on August 15, 1945, with the notion being officially signed on September 2, 1945. The isolated Japanese garrison on Nauru received their orders to surrender, and on September 13, 1945, an Australian force arrived aboard the H.M.A.S. Diamantina, with Australian administration of Nauru being restored without a battle. Nauruans welcomed the return of Australian administration for their island, due to the harsh treatment they endured at the hands of the Japanese.

After World War II, it was governed by Australia as a United Nations Trust Territory. In 1966, Nauru followed Australia by changing its currency to the new Australian Dollar. In 1968, Nauru became an independent sovereign nation, following the Australian parliament's passage of the Nauru Independence Act 1967. Nauru opted to keep the Australian Dollar rather than creating its own currency, and the Australian Dollar remains the official currency of Nauru.

== Bilateral relations since Nauru's independence ==
During the 1970s and 1980s, Nauru became one of the richest countries in the world due to phosphate reserves. Nauru at one point earned 70 times more than its neighboring island countries, who were dependent on aid from the likes of Australia, Japan and the United States. Nauru suffered a financial collapse beginning in the late 1980s, due to a decline in their phosphate, the lavish lifestyles of government officials and misguided financial decisions, such as investing in a London West End musical. In 1989, Nauru appealed against Australia to the International Court of Justice, due to the environmental devastation inflicted by phosphate mining during the colonial period. In 1994, Australia agreed to settle the matter with Nauru out of court. The Australian Government agreed to pay Nauru A$57 million in compensation as well as A$50 million over the next 20 years.

In August 2001, bilateral relations were strengthened by an agreement known as the "Pacific Solution". Nauru agreed to host a detention centre for refugee applicants seeking asylum in Australia, in exchange for economic aid. As part of the "Pacific Solution", Australia also established another detention facility on Manus Island in Papua New Guinea. This initiative was led by Australia's ruling liberal party. Most of the asylum seekers were from areas around the Indian Ocean, including South Asia, Southeast Asia and the Middle East. The agreement came to an end in 2007, following the election of labour party politician Kevin Rudd as Prime Minister of Australia. The end of the agreement prompted Nauruan concerns about the future of the island's revenue. In 2004, an episode of Australian investigative series Four Corners focused on the mismanagement that led to Nauru's dramatic economic decline, and included interviews with Nauruan figures. A later Four Corners episode featured secretly conducted interviews with children at the Nauru detention center.

In March 2008, talks began between Australia and Nauru regarding the future of the former's economic development aid to the latter. Nauruan Foreign and Finance Minister Dr Kieren Keke stated that his country did not want aid handouts. One possible solution explored was for Australia to assist Nauru in setting up a "boat repair industry" for regional fishing vessels. In July 2008, Australia pledged €17 million in aid for the following financial year, along with assistance for "a plan aimed at helping Nauru to survive without aid", according to ABC Radio Australia.

In August 2012, Australia announced it would reopen offshore processing on Nauru and Manus Island after a rise in boat arrivals. Transfers to Nauru began on September 14, 2012. Australian think tank the Lowy Institute conducted a 2017 poll regarding the Nauru and Manus Island policy, revealing a divided Australian public. When asked whether recognized refugees in offshore facilities should be resettled in Australia, 45% agreed they should be settled locally, while 48% believed they should never be allowed to settle in Australia, with 7% undecided. In 2018, Australia agreed to remove children from the Nauru detention facility, following public outcry and a "Kids Off Nauru" campaign. The campaign even received support from Rupert Murdoch's conservative News Corp. publications, which are known for having a negative attitude toward asylum seekers in Australia.

In 2019, it was reported that former Nauruan president Sprent Dabwido was seeking treatment for cancer in Australia rather than his homeland, claiming his political rivals in the current government prevented him from receiving treatment, since they would rather see him dead.

In response to the COVID-19 pandemic in 2020, the Australian government created a COVID-19 Development Response Plan for Nauru. Australia committed to scaling up support for Nauru's health system, which faced vulnerabilities due to high rates of non-communicable diseases (NCDs) and limited surge capacity. This included technical assistance, medical equipment upgrades, and facilitating equitable access to safe and effective COVID-19 vaccines through regional and multilateral initiatives. The plan prioritized maintaining critical education services by helping Nauru adapt to remote learning options. This was vital given that nearly half of Nauru's population was under 20. The plan recognized Nauru's heavy reliance on imports, meaning that it also had to prioritize keeping vital transport and freight pathways open between Australia and Nauru (particularly via Brisbane) to protect food security. Additionally, the plan committed to longer-term investments, such as supporting the Nauru Trust Fund to drive economic recovery and resilience.

In December 2021, Australia, Japan and the United States pledged a new undersea internet cable for Nauru, Kiribati and the Federated States of Micronesia. On 9 December 2024, Australia and Nauru signed a joint security treaty which provided for Australia to provide Nauru with A$100 million (US$64 million) in direct aid over five years in exchange for Nauru consulting with Australia before signing any bilateral agreements with other countries. At the signing, Australian prime minister Anthony Albanese said, "our countries share a special bond. We share geography, we share history, we share a region. And of course, we share deep and strong bonds between our people".

On March 18, 2025, a team of Australian Defence Force (ADF) explosive experts collaborated with Nauruan authorities to safely dispose of two World War II-era unexploded ordnance (UXO) found in a residential area. Led by Sergeant Matthew Watson of the 20th Explosive Ordnance Disposal Squadron (20 EOD Sqn), a specialized team was deployed to the island within three days of the discovery. Upon inspection, the team identified the items as five-inch projectiles, one of which carried a high risk of detonating if left undisturbed. Sergeant Watson highlighted the urgency of the mission, noting that an unexpected detonation in a residential neighborhood would have had devastating consequences for the local community. The swift response was made possible by 20 EOD Sqn's continuous readiness under Operation Render Safe, the ADF's ongoing commitment to removing dangerous explosive remnants of war across Pacific nations.

On August 29, 2025, Australia signed an agreement with Nauru allowing for the deportation of formerly detained people without valid Australian visas to the island in exchange for financial compensation of at least A$408 million.

In 2026, Nauru still held around 100 detained asylum seekers. In a July 2026 survey, asylum seekers complained that they didn't have access to enough food and water in the Nauru detention facility, despite Australia spending an estimated $9 million per every detainee. Most of the roughly 100 people stuck in limbo on the island reported that their $260 fortnightly government allowance was entirely inadequate to cover basic necessities, clean drinking water, and skyrocketing local food prices driven by import dependence. The asylum seekers are legally barred from working while awaiting their refugee determinations or third-country resettlement, thus preventing them from getting additional sources of income.

On July 6, 2026, a Chinese submarine test-fired a strategic ballistic missile carrying a dummy warhead into the South Pacific. The rocket landed between the Solomon Islands, Nauru, and Tuvalu. China provided Australia with only two hours' notice, violating the standard 48-hour international notification procedure. Australian foreign minister Penny Wong said Australia had informed China that it regarded the missile test as "destabilizing to the region". The missile test also sparked debate within the Pacific Islands Forum. PIF members Australia, New Zealand, Fiji, Papua New Guinea, and Tuvalu supported a joint statement expressing concern, while some members, including Nauru and Kiribati, were more reluctant to directly criticize China, preventing a unanimous response.

== Economic relations ==
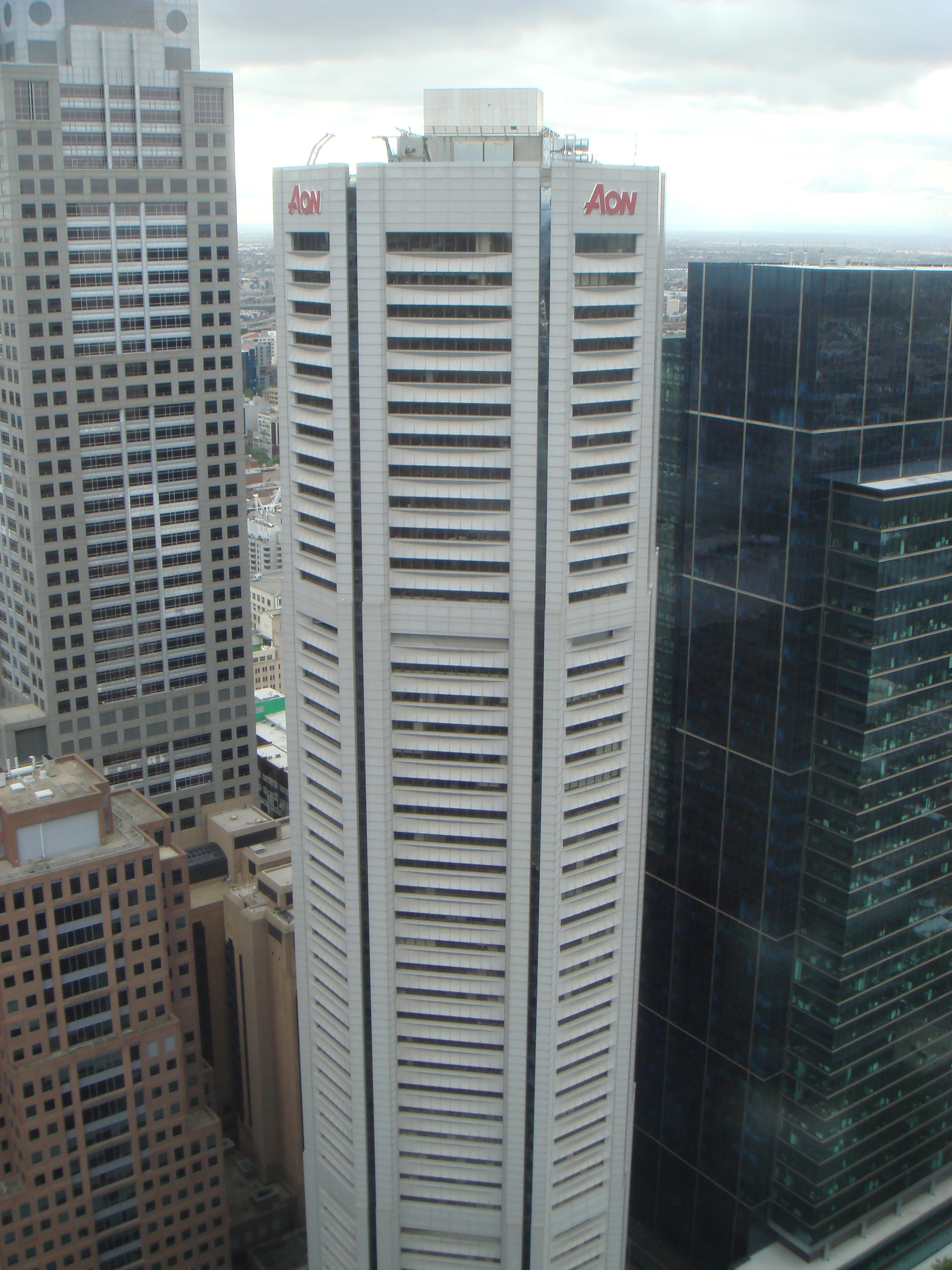
The Nauru House building in Melbourne, Australia.

When Nauru was administered by Australia in association with the United Kingdom and New Zealand, the British Phosphate Commissioners was established under the Nauru Island Agreement in 1919. It allotted shares among the three countries, so that Australia and the United Kingdom would take 42% each of the phosphates produced, while New Zealand was allotted 16%. The agreement made no mention of any payments to Nauruans, as those were for each Australian administrator to determine later in consultation with Canberra. Nauruans were concerned that their small numbers, amounting to 1,084 in 1921, contributed to their lack of voice with the Australian administrators.

After World War II, there was an almost total destruction of the phosphate works on Nauru, much to the dismay of Australia, and it proved to be a huge task to reconstruct all the installations and buildings and repair the badly damaged cantilever. By June 1948, 1,400 Chinese and 125 Europeans had been brought in to rehabilitate the industry and in 1947-8 over 263,500 tons, one-third of the 1940 output, was shipped.

In 1972, the government of newly independent Nauru bought Australian land at a price of A$19 million. This land became Nauru House in Melbourne, as part of their international investment portfolio. Nauru House was briefly Melbourne's tallest building, and in the 1980s, Nauru utilized their phosphate wealth to create similar buildings in Hawaii and the Philippines, with the Philippines project losing Nauru over $1 billion. In 2004, the Nauruan Government was forced to sell Nauru House to pay off debts.

In 1995, Nauru invested in the financially struggling Fitzroy Lions, which competed in the AFL, the top national league for Australian Rules Football. Nauru agreed to grant the Lions a seven-year loan, at the time worth over one million Australian dollars, in exchange for Nauruan politician Kinza Clodumar getting a seat on the ailing club's board. However, Clodumar got ousted from the government in November 1995, and Nauru's new governors concluded that any projects in operation were to be halted, with audits into every single one of the island's offshore ventures to be conducted. Nauru was granted legal advice that it would be improper to continue propping up an insolvent business such as the Fitzroy Lions, and the club entered the 1996 season in severe financial distress. After 100 years in the league, the club eventually had to merge with the Brisbane Bears, and began playing as the Brisbane Lions in 1997.

Monthly value of Australian merchandise exports to Nauru (A$ millions) since 1988

Monthly value of Nauru's merchandise exports to Australia (A$ millions) since 1988

Australia remains one of Nauru's major diplomatic and economic partners. It is Nauru's largest bilateral aid donor, aligning its broader Pacific development programs with the Government of Nauru's National Sustainable Development Strategy (NSDS). Bilateral assistance focuses heavily on education, economic governance, infrastructure, and health. The $20 million Nauru Education Program (2022–2027) aimed to improve student enrollment, attendance, and learning outcomes while supporting both the Department of Education and the Department of Vocational Training and Professional Development. In economic governance, the $60 million Nauru-Australia Partnership on Economic Governance (2023–2031) seeks to strengthen public financial management and economic diversification, complemented by Australia's role in the Nauru Intergenerational Trust Fund to secure long-term budgetary self-reliance. Infrastructure connectivity has been advanced through co-financing the Sustainable and Climate Resilient Connectivity Port Project with the Asian Development Bank and the Green Climate Fund, alongside International Airport upgrades and the East Micronesia submarine cable via the Australian Infrastructure Financing Facility for the Pacific. In health, the $50 million Raña Tsimorum program (2025–2034) seeks to help manage health threats, deliver inclusive services, and promote healthy lifestyles, supported by disability allowance reviews under the Partnerships for Social Protection Program. Australia has also supported gender equality in Nauru by backing the 2023 registration of the Women's Empowerment Nauru Association (WENA) as the country's first women-focused civil society organization.

== Multilateral organizations ==
The two countries are members of the Pacific Islands Forum, Pacific Regional Environment Programme, The Pacific Community, the United Nations and the Commonwealth of Nations. Nauru is one of only two Micronesian countries which is part of the Commonwealth of Nations, along with Kiribati. In 2021, Nauru and the four other Micronesian countries in the Pacific Islands Forum threatened to leave the organization, due to perceived bias towards the more southern countries in Melanesia and Polynesia. The five Micronesian countries eventually struck a deal in July 2022 to stay in the organization.
