= Nauruan language =

Austronesian language

Nauruan
- Dorerin Naoe, Ekaiairũ Naoero
- Native to: Nauru
- Ethnicity: Nauruans
- Native speakers: 9,356 (2013)
- Language family: Austronesian: Malayo-Polynesian; Oceanic; Micronesian; Nauruan
- Early forms: Proto-Austronesian: Proto-Malayo-Polynesian; Proto-Oceanic; Proto-Micronesian; Old Nauruan
- Standard forms: Standard Nauruan
- Dialects: Nauruan dialects
- Writing system: Latin

Official status
- Official language in: Nauru

Language codes
- ISO 639-1: na
- ISO 639-2: nau
- ISO 639-3: nau
- Glottolog: naur1243
- ELP: Nauruan
- IETF: na-NR
- Nauruan is classified as Severely Endangered by the UNESCO Atlas of the World's Languages in Danger.

- Map showing the distribution of the Micronesian languages; Nauruan-speaking region is shaded purple.

A Nauruan speaker, recorded in Taiwan

Nauruan, Nauru, dorerin Naoero, or dei-Naoero (Nauruan: dorerin Naoero) is an Austronesian language, spoken natively in the island country of Nauru, officially the Republic of Naoero.

== Dialects ==
According to a report published in 1937 in Sydney, Australia, there was a diversity of dialects until Nauru became a colony of Germany in 1888 and the first texts in Nauruan began to be published. The varieties were so divergent that people from different districts often had problems understanding each other completely. With the increasing influence of foreign languages and the rise in the number of Nauruan texts, the dialects blended into a standardized language, which was promoted through dictionaries and translations by Alois Kayser and Philip Delaporte.

Today there is significantly less dialectal variation. In the district of Yaren and the surrounding area there is an eponymous dialect spoken, which is only slightly different from other varieties.

== Phonology ==
=== Consonants ===
Nauruan has 16–17 consonant phonemes. Nauruan makes phonemic contrasts between velarized and palatalized labial consonants. Velarization is not apparent before long back vowels and palatalization is not apparent before non-low front vowels.

Consonant phonemes
		Bilabial		Dental/ Alveolar	Palatal	Velar	
		pal.	vel.	Dental/ Alveolar	Palatal	plain	labial
Nasal		mʲ	mˠ	n		ŋ	
Plosive/ Affricate	voiceless	pʲ	pˠ	t̪ ~ t	(tʃ)	k	kʷ
Plosive/ Affricate	voiced	bʲ	bˠ	d̪ ~ d	(dʒ)	ɡ	
Fricative				(ɹ̝̊)	ʝ		
Approximant					j		w
Vibrant				r ~ ɾ	rʲ		

- Voiceless stops are geminated and nasals also contrast in length.
- /t d/ become [tʃ dʒ] before close front vowels.
  - Hughes (2020) considers /tʃ dʒ/ to be distributionally restricted phonemes.
- The approximants become fricatives in "emphatic pronunciation". Nathan (1974) transcribes them as ⟨j⟩ and ⟨w⟩ but also remarks that they contrast with the non-syllabic allophones of the high vowels. /w/ can also be heard as a fricative [ɣʷ].
- Depending on stress, /r/ may be a flap or a trill. The precise phonetic nature of /rʲ/ is unknown. Nathan (1974) transcribes it as ⟨r̵⟩ and speculates that it may pattern like palatalized consonants and be partially devoiced.
  - Hughes (2020) suggests /r rʲ/ are merging for at least some speakers.
- Between a vowel and word-final /mˠ/, an epenthetic [b] appears.

=== Vowels ===
There are 12 phonemic vowels (six long, six short). In addition to the allophony in the following table from Nathan (1974), a number of vowels reduce to [ə]:

Phoneme	Allophones	Phoneme	Allophones
/ii/	[iː]	/uu/	[ɨː ~ uː]
/i/	[ɪ ~ ɨ]	/u/	[ɨ ~ u]
/ee/	[eː ~ ɛː]	/oo/	[oː ~ ʌ(ː) ~ ɔ(ː)]
/e/	[ɛ ~ ʌ]	/o/	[ʌ]
/aa/	[æː]	/ɑɑ/	[ɑː]
/a/	[æ ~ ɑ]	/ɑ/	[ɑ ~ ʌ]

Non-open vowels (that is, all but /aa/, /a/, /ɑɑ/ /ɑ/) become non-syllabic when preceding another vowel, as in /e-oeeoun/ → [ɛ̃õ̯ɛ̃õ̯ʊn] ('hide').

=== Stress ===
Stress is on the penultimate syllable when the final syllable ends in a vowel, on the last syllable when it ends in a consonant, and initial with reduplications.

== Writing system ==
=== History ===
Writing was introduced to Nauru by Christian missionaries during the 19th century, comparatively later than other islands in the region. The language was alphabetised by German missionary Philip Delaporte beginning in 1899.

=== Original ===
In the original writing system for Nauruan, 17 letters were used:

- The five vowels: a, e, i, o, u
- Twelve consonants: b, d, g, j, k, m, n, p, q, r, t, w

The letters c, f, h, l, s, v, x, y, and z were not included. With the growing influence of foreign languages, in particular German, English, Gilbertese, and part of the Pama-Nyungan family, more letters were incorporated into the Nauruan alphabet. In addition, phonetic differences of a few vowels arose, so that umlauts and other similar sounds were indicated with a tilde.

=== 1938 reforms ===
In 1936, the Australian administration of Nauru established a Language Committee to investigate "certain matters connected with the Nauruan language". Its report "recommended a reform of the Nauruan orthography, new rules for the spelling of foreign loan words, the standardised pronunciation of sounds that were undergoing changes at the time and the adoption of English names for the days of the week and the months in preference to the German ones which were still widely used". Its recommendations were officially gazetted on 5 November 1938 and the committee remained in place as a de facto language academy that was regularly consulted by the Australian administration on linguistic matters.

The reforms were intended to introduce as many diacritical symbols as possible for the different vowel sounds to state the variety of the Nauruan language in writing. It was decided to introduce only a circumflex accent in the place of the former tilde, so that the characters "õ" and "ũ" were replaced by "ô" and "û". The "ã" was replaced with "e".

Also, "y" was introduced in order to differentiate words with the English "j" (puji). Thus, words like ijeiji were changed to iyeyi. In addition, "ñ" (which represented the velar nasal) was replaced with "ng", to avoid confusion with the Spanish Ñ. "bu" and "qu" were replaced with "bw" and "kw", respectively. "ts" was replaced with "j" (since it represented a sound similar to the English "j"); and the "w" written at the end of words was dropped.

=== Modern orthography ===
These reforms were only partly carried out: the symbols "õ" and "ũ" are still written as such, with tildes. However, the letters "ã" and "ñ" are now only seldom used, being replaced with "e" and "ng", as prescribed by the reform. Likewise, use of the digraphs "bw" and "kw" has been implemented. Although "j" took the place of "ts", certain spellings still use "ts": e.g., the districts Baiti and Ijuw (according to the reform Beiji and Iyu) are still written with the old writing conventions. The "y" has become generally accepted.

Today the following 30 Latin letters are used.

- Vowels: a, ã, e, i, o, õ, u, ũ
- Consonants: b, c, d, f, g, h, j, k, l, m, n, ñ, p, q, r, s, t, v, w, x, y, z

== Literature ==
The first texts in Nauruan were mimeographs published by Philip Delaporte's Protestant Mission in Orro. These included several primers for use in Nauruan schools, beginning with Buch en lesen n kakairun in 1900, and texts for religious instruction. Delaporte filled lexical gaps with borrowings from German, which was taught alongside Nauruan.

In 1906, the Protestant Mission acquired a printing press from Sydney and began training Nauruan converts in its use, including Timothy Detudamo and Jacob Aroi. The first printed book in Nauruan was Toranab in Bibel, a collection of Bible stories, with a print run of 400 copies made in 1906. In 1907, Delaporte, Detudamo and Aroi completed a translation of the New Testament into Nauruan, published as Neues Testament naran aen wora Temoniba ma Amen Kastimor nea Jesu Kristo and "remembered as a landmark in the history of the Nauruan language".

A full Nauruan edition of the Bible was not published until 1918. Delaporte had returned to the United States in 1915 due to his wife's poor health. Nauruans raised $500 to allow Detudamo to travel with him and complete their work, which was published by the American Board of Missions.

=== Dictionaries ===
In 1907, Delaporte published Kleines Taschenwörterbuch Deutsch-Nauru ("Small Pocket-Dictionary German–Nauru"), which has been described as "the first linguistic publication on the Nauruan language". The dictionary is small (10.5 × 14 cm), with 65 pages devoted to the glossary and an additional dozen to phrases, arranged alphabetically by the German. Approximately 1650 German words are glossed in Nauruan, often by phrases or synonymous forms. There are some 1300 "unique" Nauruan forms in the glosses, including all those occurring in phrases, ignoring diacritical marks. The accents used there are not common; just one accent (the tilde) is in use today.

Delaporte's linguistic work was adapted and modified by Paul Hambruch, an ethnologist who visited Nauru in 1909 and 1910. Hambruch published a Nauruan grammar, vocabulary, and several texts, as part of a larger ethnographical work. Alois Kayser, a Catholic missionary on Nauru, was skeptical of both Delaporte and Hambruch's work and commenced work on a new grammar. This was eventually completed in 1936 and published by the Australian administration.

== Vocabulary ==
Nauruan	English
anũbũmin	night
aran	day
ebagadugu	ancestor
Ekamawir omo/Ekamowir omo (more formal); Mo mo (more informal)	hello/greeting/welcome
ebõk	water
Firmament	Earth; celestial sphere
Gott	God
ianweron	heaven
iaõ	light
iow	peace
itũr	darkness
õawin	beginning
Tarawong (ka)	goodbye
wa reit ed?/mo awe？	How are you?

== Sample text ==
The following example of text is from the Bible (Genesis, 1.1–1.8):

^{1}Ñaga ã eitsiõk õrig imin, Gott õrig ianweron me eb. ^{2}Me eitsiõk erig imin ñana bain eat eb, me eko õañan, mi itũr emek animwet ijited, ma Anin Gott õmakamakur animwet ebõk. ^{3}Me Gott ũge, Enim eaõ, me eaõen. ^{4}Me Gott ãt iaõ bwo omo, me Gott õekae iaõ mi itũr. ^{5}Me Gott eij eget iaõ bwa Aran, me eij eget itũr bwa Anũbũmin. Ma antsiemerin ma antsioran ar eken ũrõr adamonit ibũm. ^{6}Me Gott ũge, Enim tsimine firmament inimaget ebõk, me enim ekae ebõk atsin eat ebõk. ^{7}Me Gott eririñ firmament, mõ õ ekae ebõk ñea ijõñin firmament atsin eat ebõk ñea itũgain firmament, mõ ũgan. ^{8}Me Gott eij egen firmament bwe Ianweron. Ma antsiemerin ma antsioran ar eken ũrõr karabũmit ibũm.

This text demonstrates a few of the German loanwords (e.g. Gott, "God"; and Firmament, "celestial sphere") in Nauruan, which is traced back to the strong influence of German missionaries.

== Bibliography ==
- Rensch, Karl H. (1993). "Father Alois Kayser and the Recent History of the Nauruan Language". Nauru Grammar. By Kayser, Alois. Embassy of the Federal Republic of Germany, Australia. ISBN 064612854X.
- Nathan, Geoffrey S. (1974), "Nauruan in the Austronesian Language Family", Oceanic Linguistics, 12 (1/2), University of Hawai'i Press: 479–501, doi:10.2307/3622864, JSTOR 3622864
