= 2022 Nauruan parliamentary election =

- 24 September 2022
President before election
Lionel Aingimea
Elected President
Russ Kun

Parliamentary elections were held in Nauru on 24 September 2022 to elect all 19 members of parliament. All candidates were elected on a non-partisan basis. Following the election, Russ Kun, a member of parliament for Ubenide, was elected president by parliament.

== Background ==
In the 2019 elections, nearly half of the Parliament members lost their seats, including incumbent President Baron Waqa. Justice minister David Adeang, Waqa's deputy, retained his seat. Adeang was a candidate in the following presidential election; he lost to Lionel Aingimea, who had been an assistant minister.

The Aingimea government implemented some electoral changes. Potential candidates in regularly scheduled general elections were now required to register their intention 270 days before the end of the parliamentary term. These declared candidates would then file nominations during the nomination period. To address public concerns about granting citizenship to foreigners, the government held a constitutional referendum in 2021 which disqualified naturalised citizens and their descendants from running for Parliament.

Aingimea also pushed for strong stances in Pacific affairs. Nauru supported the Micronesia boycott of the Pacific Islands Forum in 2021, which aimed for a Micronesian secretary-general; it also offered to temporarily host a Micronesia secretariat. When University of the South Pacific Vice-Chancellor Pal Ahluwalia was deported from Fiji after investigating university finances, Nauru hosted Ahluwalia at its campus for the term. Aingimea also supported the USP Council's decision to renew Ahluwalia's contract, and commissioned the auditing firm BDO to further pursue the investigation.

== Electoral system ==
The 19 members of Parliament are elected from eight multi-member constituencies using the Dowdall system, a version of ranked voting; voters rank candidates, with the votes counted as a fraction of one divided by the ranking number (e.g. a candidate ranked second will be scored as 1/2); the candidates with the highest total are elected. There are no political parties, so all candidates run as independents. Informal groups do form in Parliament, but membership is fluid.

Parliament is elected for a three-year term, but can be dissolved earlier. The government, which comprises the President and the Cabinet, must retain the support of a majority in Parliament.

All citizens aged 20 and older are permitted to cast their ballot; once an individual reaches voting age, they are automatically added to the electoral roll. Voting is compulsory in Nauru; individuals who fail to vote without sufficient reasoning are required to pay a fine. Nauruans who provide proof of illness, are in hospital or are not present in the country on election day are excused. However, Nauruans overseas on the polling day have the option to engage in proxy voting, where an individual assigns someone in Nauru to vote on their behalf. The electoral commission provides a mobile voting service for voters hospitalised or unable to go to polling stations due to incapacity, involving polling staff travelling to these individuals to ensure they can cast their ballot.

== Conduct ==
On 29 August, Speaker of Parliament Marcus Stephen issued a writ of election for 24 September. 8,054 eligible voters registered for this election. The electoral roll was opened between 1 and 3 September for verification. Nominations were accepted between 4 and 10 September. 77 candidates were nominated to contest the election. The Pacific Islands Forum sent an election monitoring team led by Feue Tipu, the High Commissioner of Tuvalu to New Zealand.

Early voting commenced on 19 September. Due to the COVID-19 pandemic, the electoral commission encouraged polling stations to enforce rigorous hygiene measures. On election day, 24 September, the polling concluded at 6 pm local time.

== Results ==
The vote count began after the close of polls, and was completed on Monday, 26 September. The speaker and the twelve government members retained their seats. Out of the six opposition members, two were unseated: Milton Dube (Aiwo) and Tawaki Kam (Meneng).

Former presidents Ludwig Scotty and Baron Waqa ran for election, but did not enter Parliament.

=== Aiwo ===
Candidate	Preference votes										Total	Notes
Candidate	1	2	3	4	5	6	7	8	9	10	Total	Notes
Rennier Gadabu	248	178	66	38	12	23	17	30	40	146	399.956	Re-elected
Delvin Thoma	183	166	76	64	53	29	53	58	87	29	350.155	Elected
Milton Dube	142	74	67	62	60	35	56	73	82	147	275.603	Unseated
Aaron Cook	84	35	60	61	62	89	91	144	115	57	213.461	
Vania Scotty	60	51	53	76	89	141	118	76	88	46	204.202	
Clarissa Jeremiah	38	68	113	79	91	115	118	86	58	32	204.035	
Shane Detenamo	15	57	151	122	116	83	91	71	57	35	193.075	
Ken Blake	9	55	89	117	175	112	83	76	53	29	179.229	
Cory Caleb	3	93	69	42	48	83	76	101	121	162	159.560	
Evi Agir	16	21	54	137	92	88	95	83	97	115	158.041	
Invalid/blank votes											17	
Total											815	
Source: Electoral Commission of Nauru

=== Anabar ===
Candidate	Preference votes									Total	Notes
Candidate	1	2	3	4	5	6	7	8	9	Total	Notes
Pyon Deiye	300	211	38	50	14	13	5	22	5	439.653	Re-elected
Maverick Eoe	245	192	48	22	18	21	16	14	82	382.747	Re-elected
Ludwig Scotty	57	43	39	48	53	51	75	149	143	167.828	
Marita Agigo	17	58	68	85	52	64	197	91	26	153.390	
Bureiy Deireragea	15	36	72	68	173	135	58	55	46	151.372	
Junior Olsson	19	53	101	57	52	40	61	102	173	151.170	
Patrick Scotty	4	44	54	176	104	98	61	63	54	147.723	
Dawson Agege	1	9	169	64	96	62	88	92	77	139.994	
Narmi Doguape	0	12	69	88	96	174	97	70	52	127.585	
Invalid/blank votes										17	
Total										675	
Source: Electoral Commission of Nauru

=== Anetan ===
Candidate	Preference votes						Total	Notes
Candidate	1	2	3	4	5	6	Total	Notes
Timothy Ika	483	324	30	22	20	19	667.667	Re-elected
Marcus Stephen	298	346	75	43	48	88	531.017	Re-elected
Raynor Tom	39	89	188	125	398	59	266.850	
Clifford Simon	11	46	260	365	151	65	252.950	
Cyril Buraman	62	68	62	79	74	553	243.383	
Begg Adire	5	25	283	264	207	114	238.233	
Invalid/blank votes							11	
Total							909	
Source: Electoral Commission of Nauru

=== Boe ===
Candidate	Preference votes						Total	Notes
Candidate	1	2	3	4	5	6	Total	Notes
Asterio Appi	396	175	92	51	107	221	585.150	Re-elected
Martin Hunt	318	325	85	135	128	51	576.683	Re-elected
Wanganeen Emiu	207	212	122	119	191	191	453.450	
Baron Waqa	103	66	114	106	260	393	318.000	
Samvic Namaduk	8	154	333	243	184	120	313.550	
Dempsey Detenamo	10	110	296	388	172	66	306.067	
Invalid/blank votes							4	
Total							1046	
Source: Electoral Commission of Nauru

=== Buada ===
Candidate	Preference votes									Total	Notes
Candidate	1	2	3	4	5	6	7	8	9	Total	Notes
Bingham Agir	205	47	13	14	7	11	11	26	175	263.833	Re-elected
Shadlog Bernicke	166	38	31	21	14	27	23	74	115	233.197	Re-elected
Sean Halstead	34	108	68	56	55	49	59	72	8	162.151	
Jaxon Olsson	34	60	53	73	71	121	48	36	13	147.085	
Sheeva Peo Cook	38	60	62	61	56	35	88	76	33	146.688	
Rowan Detenamo	11	35	110	81	75	69	50	53	25	128.462	
Aie Ribauw	11	50	50	51	114	78	81	59	15	121.830	
Elchen Morgan	5	79	58	45	59	50	62	67	84	121.782	
Nanero Thoma	5	32	64	107	58	69	87	46	41	114.917	
Invalid/blank votes										2	
Total										511	
Source: Electoral Commission of Nauru

=== Meneng ===
Candidate	Preference votes											Total	Notes
Candidate	1	2	3	4	5	6	7	8	9	10	11	Total	Notes
Lionel Aingimea	442	174	98	57	47	42	43	80	80	129	147	643.612	Re-elected
Khyde Menke	223	349	117	77	52	38	39	44	64	136	191	530.630	Re-elected
Jesse Jeremiah	223	134	127	95	88	65	77	75	160	113	182	450.515	Elected
Tawaki Kam	146	128	160	109	98	77	153	94	114	134	126	394.145	Unseated
Vodrick Detsiogo	63	92	138	134	131	144	171	219	105	82	60	315.825	
Robert Timothy	59	99	111	132	155	132	136	132	134	197	52	306.745	
Wiram Wiram	83	81	114	89	94	103	92	136	171	140	236	304.314	
Ronay Dick	16	79	218	192	175	169	156	116	99	78	41	298.646	
Jim Brechtefeld	68	61	84	126	103	198	145	168	151	129	106	292.628	
Samson Rock	3	78	100	121	229	167	171	146	131	101	92	254.914	
Nickos Simon	4	64	72	207	167	204	156	129	130	100	106	292.628	
Invalid/blank votes												36	
Total												1375	
Source: Electoral Commission of Nauru

=== Ubenide ===
Candidate	Preference votes																		Total	Notes
Candidate	1	2	3	4	5	6	7	8	9	10	11	12	13	14	15	16	17	18	Total	Notes
Russ Kun	275	263	235	129	127	46	48	31	47	39	25	28	34	24	33	104	46	32	592.124	Re-elected
David Adeang	254	270	168	145	96	59	42	27	38	24	29	25	31	32	48	62	59	157	554.938	Re-elected
Wawani Dowiyogo	231	286	135	104	53	45	33	29	30	40	22	30	28	34	45	89	246	86	515.666	Re-elected
Reagan Aliklik	249	66	87	63	31	33	17	34	36	43	46	42	51	39	38	73	148	470	409.732	Re-elected
Vyko Adeang	148	63	81	144	76	57	51	67	89	107	98	91	69	96	73	139	70	47	352.390	
Ranin Akua	108	170	76	80	85	55	77	77	63	80	54	58	72	73	96	118	147	76	347.464	
Gregor Garoa	68	127	153	146	123	143	114	94	80	65	55	60	83	68	84	59	39	14	343.897	
George Gioura	53	61	121	143	149	169	138	104	88	79	54	64	59	91	69	39	54	31	301.159	
Daniel Itsamaera	51	48	124	69	64	65	66	92	124	104	123	110	138	125	111	58	56	38	258.646	
Mark Menke	21	39	53	109	96	106	124	125	126	112	106	81	89	143	78	67	61	30	228.912	
Livingstone Hiram	22	24	61	61	81	95	105	103	132	139	112	176	129	100	70	76	47	33	213.987	
Ceila Giouba	11	20	65	90	117	120	122	150	92	109	83	78	85	52	68	74	83	147	212.373	
Aidan Atto	22	29	45	39	63	115	110	143	114	138	164	150	97	102	91	60	51	33	209.879	
Starsky Dagagio	11	12	25	52	164	131	105	108	129	115	124	104	98	85	73	55	68	107	199.098	
Fabain Ribauw	13	22	34	54	90	99	125	105	106	87	121	102	96	113	146	115	73	65	194.575	
Wavman Harris	18	24	27	48	42	80	117	103	95	119	159	111	137	154	133	109	60	30	190.896	
Maximillian Kun	5	23	44	56	54	59	93	79	75	70	93	129	167	135	172	149	84	79	176.097	
Temakau Tannang	6	19	32	34	54	89	79	95	102	96	98	127	103	100	138	129	174	91	171.506	
Invalid/blank votes																			64	
Total																			1630	
Source: Electoral Commission of Nauru

=== Yaren ===
Candidate	Preference votes								Total	Notes
Candidate	1	2	3	4	5	6	7	8	Total	Notes
Charmaine Scotty	249	261	68	48	41	78	49	60	449.867	Re-elected
Isabella Dageago	257	49	29	30	37	41	87	324	365.829	Re-elected
Caruso Amwano	156	67	59	57	56	61	210	188	298.283	
Hunter Itaia	110	113	107	60	76	150	161	77	289.992	
John Julius	18	128	227	143	129	102	67	40	250.788	
Charisma Capelle	34	72	135	144	157	155	118	39	229.965	
Rumple Cain	20	71	110	221	162	123	80	67	220.120	
Mariae Cain	10	93	119	151	196	144	82	59	216.206	
Invalid/blank votes									5	
Total									859	
Source: Electoral Commission of Nauru

== Presidential election ==
Following the elections, the newly elected MPs elected the president, who was required by the constitution be a member of parliament. The first session of the 24th parliament was held on 28 September. Russ Kun, a representative for the Ubenide constituency, was the only candidate for president. Former president Marcus Stephen won re-election as speaker of parliament, whilst outgoing president Lionel Aingimea was elected deputy speaker.

Kun and his thirteen-member cabinet were sworn in a ceremony on 29 September. There were six other ministers besides Kun himself, and seven deputy ministers (which included the two new members). Both heads of resident missions, from Australia and Taiwan, were in attendance. The visiting New Zealand high commissioner met with Kun to offer congratulations, and the non-resident European Union ambassador to the Pacific congratulated him on Twitter.

=== 2023 Presidential election ===
2023 Nauruan presidential election
- 30 October 2023
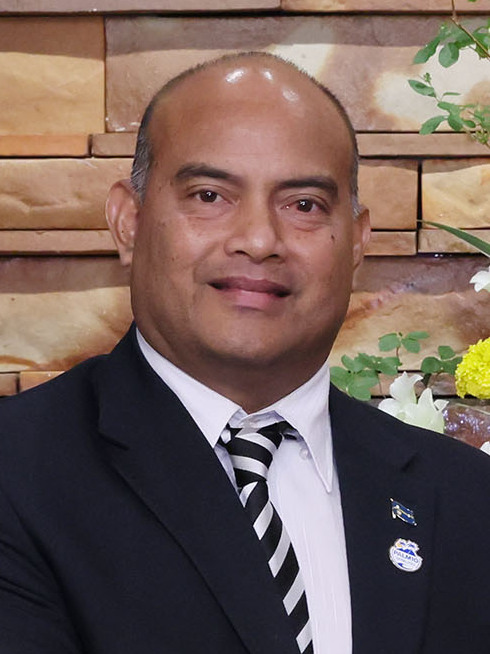

Nominee	David Adeang	Delvin Thoma
Party	Independent	Independent
Electoral vote	10	8
Percentage	55.56%	44.44%
President before election
Russ Kun
Independent
Elected President
David Adeang
Independent

On 25 October 2023 parliament passed a vote of no confidence against Kun. The same day, parliament unsuccessfully attempted to elect a new president. The two nominees were opposition MP David Adeang and government MP Rennier Gadabu. After two rounds of ballots, the vote was ultimately 9–9 on both occasions. Speaker Marcus Stephen then called for a new presidential vote to be held on 30 October. On 30 October, MP Bingham Agir nominated MP Delvin Thoma for president. After the first secret ballot, MP Adeang and Thoma were tied at nine votes. In the second vote, Thoma received only eight votes to Adeang's ten, resulting in the election of Adeang as president. Adeang was sworn in on 31 October.
