= 2013 Nauruan parliamentary election =

- 8 June 2013
- Presidential vote
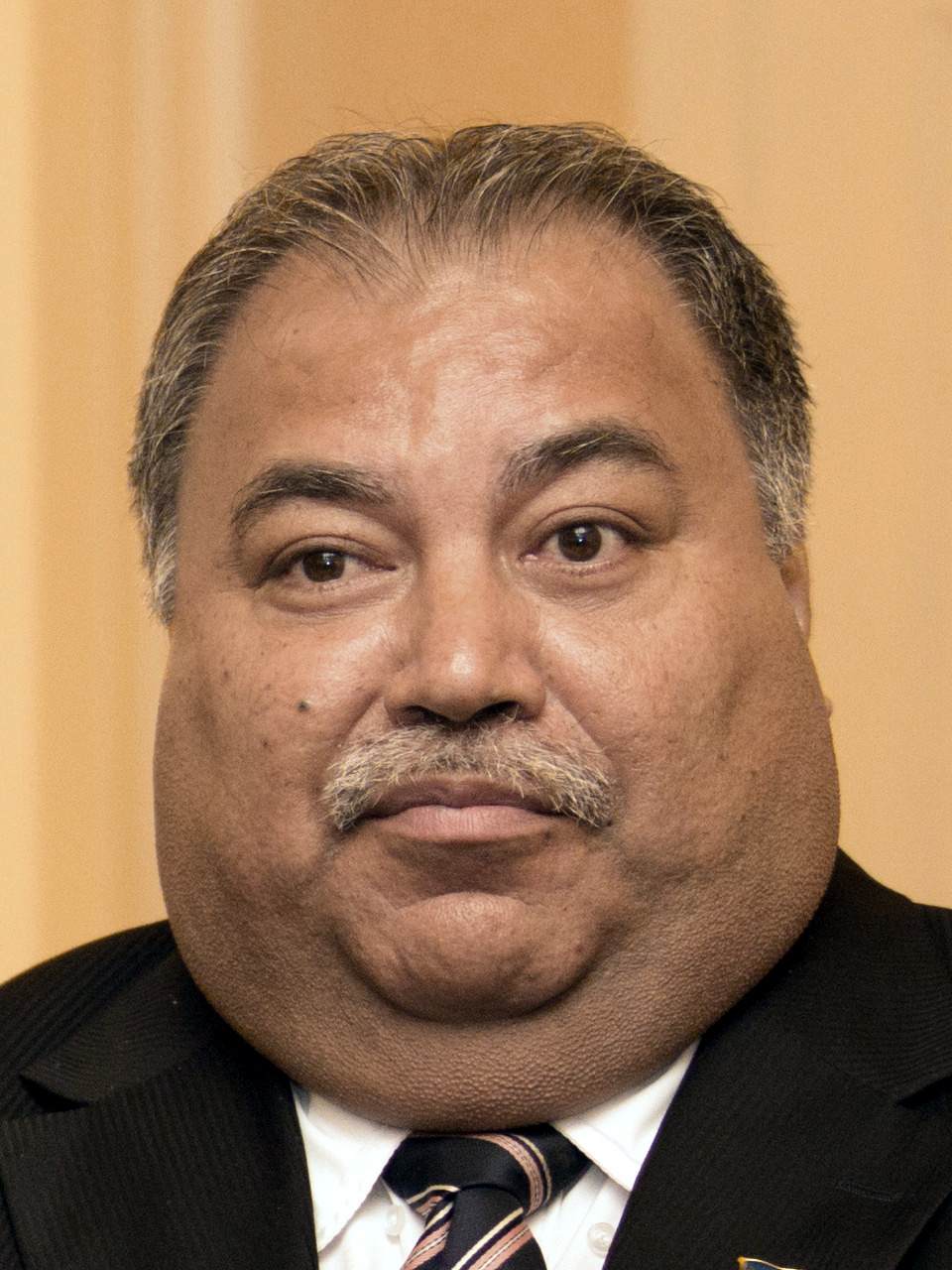

Nominee	Baron Waqa	Roland Kun
Electoral vote	13	5
President before election
Sprent Dabwido
President-designate
Baron Waqa

Parliamentary elections were held in Nauru on 8 June 2013. After Parliament was dissolved on 1 March, the elections were set for 6 April. However, a Supreme Court ruling annulled the dissolution and cancelled the elections. Parliament was dissolved again on 23 May, approximately one month before the normal end of its mandate, and elections were set for 22 June 2013, however President Sprent Dabwido declared a state of emergency and brought the election forward to 8 June. Parliament first sat on June 11 and Fisheries Minister Baron Waqa, the leader of the government forces, was elected president.

== Background ==
In February 2013 a constitutional crisis developed after two cabinet members resigned and a third was sacked by President Sprent Dabwido, leaving just two members in the cabinet, whilst the 18-member Parliament split into three factions. On 1 March Parliamentary Speaker Ludwig Scotty dissolved Parliament due to unruly behaviour by MPs, and elections were set for 6 April.

Former President Marcus Stephen, who was one of the cabinet members to leave in February threatened to bring a legal challenge against the dissolution, claiming it had been carried out in an unconstitutional manner as MPs had not been given the chance to challenge the dissolution. When Stephens and seven other MPs did take the matter to the Supreme Court, it ruled that the adjournment had been carried out unconstitutionally. However, a government spokesman claimed that the Court had no power to force Scotty to reconvene Parliament.

In mid-March the Supreme Court ruled that as the dissolution was null and void, the writ issued for elections in April was also null and void.

Speaker Scotty resigned on 18 April and was replaced by Godfrey Thoma on 25 April. Thoma announced on 16 May that Parliament would be dissolved a week from that date. Speaker Thoma dissolved Parliament on 23 May and set elections for 22 June. On 27 May 2013 President Dabwido declared a state of emergency and re-set the election for 8 June 2013.

== Electoral system ==
MPs are elected in eight multi-members constituencies using the Dowdall system, a modified version of the Borda count. Voters rank candidates by preference, with the first preference given a score of 1, the second preference a score of 1/2, the third preference a score of 1/3 and so on. Voters must rank all candidates on the ballot for it to be valid. The candidates with the highest scores win the seats in a constituency.

Until this election there had been 18 seats in Parliament with seven two-seat constituencies and one four-seat constituency, but following the June 2010 elections Parliament passed a bill to increase the number of seats to 19 to avoid 9–9 ties in the legislature. The extra member will be elected in the Meneng Constituency, which previously had two seats.

A record total of 68 candidates registered for the elections.

== Results ==
Party	Votes	%	Seats
Supporters of Baron Waqa			14
Opponents of Baron Waqa			5
Total			19
Total votes	5,349	–	
Registered voters/turnout	5,528	96.76	
Source: Turner IPU

=== By constituency ===
Constituency	Candidate	Votes	Notes
Aiwo	Milton Dube	310.450	Elected
Aiwo	Aaron Cook	251.017	Elected
Aiwo	Dantes Tsitsi	228.433	
Aiwo	Godfrey Thoma	205.800	
Aiwo	Pamela Eibutsina Scriven	170.950	
Aiwo	Lance Agir	136.567	
Aiwo	Preston Thoma	134.633	
Aiwo	Tazio Gideon	119.383	
Aiwo	Invalid/blank votes	17	
Aiwo	Total	699	
Anabar	Ludwig Scotty	255.300	Elected
Anabar	Riddell Akua	242.500	Elected
Anabar	Tyrone Deiye	208.700	
Anabar	Jaden Adun	204.367	
Anabar	Melissa Ika	165.117	
Anabar	Paul Nubwit Doguape	136.717	
Anabar	Invalid/blank votes	15	
Anabar	Total	510	
Anetan	Cyril Buraman	321.819	Elected
Anetan	Marcus Stephen	299.493	Elected
Anetan	Landon Deireragea	264.029	
Anetan	Aloysius Gonzaga Namaduk	185.562	
Anetan	Begg Adire	177.245	
Anetan	Haseldon Buraman	168.400	
Anetan	Paul Ika	164.095	
Anetan	Invalid/blank votes	20	
Anetan	Total	630	
Boe	Mathew Batsiua	279.619	Elected
Boe	Baron Waqa	224.467	Elected
Boe	Abraham Aremwa	194.350	
Boe	Bryan Star	172.100	
Boe	Lidira Ephraim	152.167	
Boe	Kinza Clodumar	138.600	
Boe	Invalid/blank votes	10	
Boe	Total	484	
Buada	Roland Kun	235.308	Elected
Buada	Shadlog Bernicke	233.032	Elected
Buada	Bingham Agir	203.975	
Buada	Sean Halstead	154.451	
Buada	Vinson Detenamo	153.155	
Buada	Arrow Depaune	140.592	
Buada	Ace Capelle	139.042	
Buada	Ishmael Fritz	131.988	
Buada	Invalid/blank votes	13	
Buada	Total	525	
Meneng	Sprent Dabwido	374.758	Elected
Meneng	Lyn-Wannan Kam	356.112	Elected
Meneng	Squire Jeremiah	303.370	Elected
Meneng	Lionel Aingimea	272.512	
Meneng	Rykers Solomon	253.298	
Meneng	Elvin Brechtefeld	237.266	
Meneng	Doneke Jim Kepae	228.710	
Meneng	Clint Deidenang	191.806	
Meneng	Sambruce Akibwib	188.619	
Meneng	Jerielyn Teleni	186.341	
Meneng	Nemo Levi Agadio	185.627	
Meneng	John Taumea Agadio	172.250	
Meneng	Nickos Simon	166.315	
Meneng	Invalid/blank votes	37	
Meneng	Total	941	
Ubenide	David Adeang	427.680	Elected
Ubenide	Valdon Dowiyogo	388.999	Elected
Ubenide	Russ J. Kun	373.357	Elected
Ubenide	Ranin Akua	357.949	Elected
Ubenide	Aloysius Amwano	309.684	
Ubenide	Julian Itsimaera	309.271	
Ubenide	Freddie Pitcher	282.819	
Ubenide	Samuel Hansome Adumur	267.771	
Ubenide	George Giovanni Gioura	252.633	
Ubenide	Vyko Adeang	207.965	
Ubenide	Renos Agege	194.381	
Ubenide	Arde Ricky Bam	189.442	
Ubenide	David Corey Dowiyogo	180.847	
Ubenide	Darned Dongobir	172.084	
Ubenide	Invalid/blank votes	61	
Ubenide	Total	1,265	
Yaren	Charmaine Scotty	303.067	Elected
Yaren	Kieren Keke	211.167	Elected
Yaren	Dominic Tabuna	187.467	
Yaren	John Daigon Panen Julius	170.333	
Yaren	Omeri Agigo	142.667	
Yaren	Brian Amwano	131.900	
Yaren	Invalid/blank votes	6	
Yaren	Total	474	
Total		5,528	
Source: Republic of Nauru Government Gazette, 9 June 2013

== Presidential election ==
On 11 June the newly elected MPs elected the president, who was required by the constitution be a member of parliament. Baron Waqa defeated Roland Kun by 13 votes to five.
