= 2025 Nauruan parliamentary election =

- 11 October 2025

All 19 seats in Parliament 10 seats needed for a majority
President before election
David Adeang
Elected President
David Adeang

Parliamentary elections were held in Nauru on 11 October 2025. It was held alongside a constitutional referendum.

== Electoral system ==
The 19 members of Parliament are elected from eight multi-member constituencies using the Dowdall system, a version of ranked voting; voters rank candidates, with the votes counted as a fraction of one divided by the ranking number (e.g. a candidate ranked second will be scored as 1/2); the candidates with the highest total are elected. There are no political parties, so all candidates run as independents. Informal groups do form in Parliament, but membership is fluid.

Parliament is elected for a three-year term, but can be dissolved earlier. The government, which comprises the President and the Cabinet, must retain the support of a majority in Parliament.

All citizens aged 20 and older are entitled to cast their ballot; once an individual reaches voting age, they are automatically added to the electoral roll. Voting is compulsory in Nauru; individuals who fail to vote without sufficient reasoning are required to pay a fine. Nauruans who provide proof of illness, are hospitalized or are abroad on election day are exempted from the fine. However, Nauruans overseas on the polling day have the option to engage in proxy voting, where an individual assigns someone in Nauru to vote on their behalf. The electoral commission provides a mobile voting service for voters hospitalised or unable to go to polling stations due to incapacity, involving polling staff travelling to these individuals to ensure they can cast their ballot.

== Background ==
The 24th Parliament of Nauru was dissolved on 26 September 2025. There were 60 candidates in the subsequent parliamentary election. The election was monitored by the Pacific Islands Forum.

== Results ==
Party	Votes	%	Seats
Independents	8,232	100.00	19
Total	8,232	100.00	19
Valid votes	8,232	98.23	
Invalid/blank votes	148	1.77	
Total votes	8,380	100.00	
Source: Government Gazette

=== Aiwo ===
Candidate	Preference votes										Total	Notes
Candidate	1	2	3	4	5	6	7	8	9	10	Total	Notes
Delvin Thoma	326	156	59	38	29	22	24	11	38	171	468.759	Re-elected
Rennier Gadabu	243	298	88	46	28	15	16	24	86	30	458.775	Re-elected
Milton Dube	112	68	73	75	85	41	53	90	124	153	260.816	
Ruskin Edrin Tsitsi	56	76	70	67	67	86	171	134	87	60	218.662	
Rockarny Agir	35	58	100	124	112	122	97	106	79	41	211.052	
Aaron Cook	46	26	109	114	97	105	105	141	84	47	207.392	
Shane Samuel Detenamo	7	101	110	114	134	108	102	84	66	48	204.671	
Vania Emong Scotty	27	27	110	107	143	149	89	80	77	65	195.120	
Elsie Denuga	10	34	106	121	84	100	106	96	92	125	175.915	
Renee-Rose Nancy Harris	12	30	49	68	95	126	111	108	141	134	158.757	
Valid votes	874											
Invalid votes	18											
Total votes	892											
Source: Electoral Commission of Nauru

=== Anabar ===
Candidate	Preference votes							Total	Notes
Candidate	1	2	3	4	5	6	7	Total	Notes
Maverick Eoe	402	97	43	35	65	52	29	499.393	Re-elected
Pyon Deiye	209	118	51	38	31	15	261	340.486	Re-elected
Tini Duburiya	26	79	195	199	107	77	40	220.198	
David Demaunga	31	141	75	100	117	121	138	214.781	
Jeb Nobob Bop	41	76	88	99	121	233	65	205.402	
Joel Jonathan Joram	11	92	159	120	121	108	112	198.200	
Jaden Dogireiy	3	120	112	132	161	117	78	196.176	
Valid votes	723								
Invalid votes	11								
Total votes	734								
Source: Electoral Commission of Nauru

=== Anetan ===
Candidate	Preference votes					Total	Notes
Candidate	1	2	3	4	5	Total	Notes
Timothy Ika	394	255	71	63	38	568.517	Re-elected
Marcus Stephen	262	293	64	64	138	473.433	Re-elected
Fabian Ika	113	146	123	115	324	320.550	
Raynor Tom	48	75	165	390	143	266.600	
Julie Olsson	4	52	398	189	178	245.517	
Valid votes	821						
Invalid votes	10						
Total votes	831						
Source: Electoral Commission of Nauru

=== Boe ===
Candidate	Preference votes					Total	Notes
Candidate	1	2	3	4	5	Total	Notes
Asterio Appi	419	182	105	64	140	589.000	Re-elected
Wanganeen Emiu	176	178	204	181	171	412.450	Elected
Martin Hunt	176	145	199	199	191	402.783	Unseated
Roy Denton Harris	129	84	161	287	249	346.217	
Samvic Namaduk	10	321	241	179	159	327.383	
Valid votes	910						
Invalid votes	9						
Total votes	919						
Source: Electoral Commission of Nauru

=== Buada ===
Candidate	Preference votes					Total	Notes
Candidate	1	2	3	4	5	Total	Notes
Shadlog Bernicke	219	130	36	47	56	318.950	Re-elected
Bingham Agir	112	72	38	38	228	215.767	Re-elected
Jansen Palik Agir	44	134	154	108	48	198.933	
Hero Dwane Kephas	47	96	174	84	87	191.400	
Dixon Rengiden Adam	66	56	86	211	69	189.217	
Valid votes	488						
Invalid votes	3						
Total votes	491						
Source: Electoral Commission of Nauru

=== Meneng ===
Candidate	Preference votes									Total	Notes
Candidate	1	2	3	4	5	6	7	8	9	Total	Notes
Lionel Aingimea	506	371	152	83	85	98	119	100	124	839.528	Re-elected
Jesse Jeremiah	358	328	304	132	82	103	111	122	98	731.896	Re-elected
Tawaki Kam	236	191	237	168	125	130	131	190	230	567.187	Elected
Khyde Menke	211	176	125	130	120	98	156	227	395	508.050	Unseated
Wiram Wiram	154	140	171	187	240	251	228	170	97	482.183	
Siro Taldon	66	171	200	228	274	237	190	155	117	428.985	
Brocky Trebla Olsson	60	117	128	180	183	232	265	270	203	375.596	
Jim Kalinsky Brechtefeld	46	74	162	236	262	292	272	194	100	371.285	
Nickos Simon	1	70	159	294	267	197	166	210	274	329.142	
Valid votes	1,638										
Invalid votes	34										
Total votes	1,672										
Source: Electoral Commission of Nauru

=== Ubenide ===
Candidate	Preference votes												Total	Notes
Candidate	1	2	3	4	5	6	7	8	9	10	11	12	Total	Notes
David Adeang	450	402	262	167	86	62	52	28	23	70	59	46	837.298	Re-elected
Reagan Aliklik	330	336	149	121	84	68	59	82	71	94	103	210	668.881	Re-elected
Russ Kun	295	166	185	371	107	76	88	65	54	86	156	58	620.795	Re-elected
Ranin Akua	130	124	378	81	95	79	86	98	116	145	181	194	454.962	Elected
Vyko Pentax Adeang	164	118	100	99	101	258	93	117	150	219	183	105	436.147	
Wawani Dowiyogo	135	120	117	108	103	114	125	106	115	104	113	447	402.408	Unseated
Gregor Ruson Garoa	61	154	143	140	155	201	147	145	151	137	233	40	379.285	
George Geovani Gioura	60	81	83	128	332	184	245	218	177	93	66	40	357.783	
Sherlock Denuga	35	87	130	150	187	165	155	338	148	101	105	106	333.549	
Benedict Abouke	34	70	82	118	213	216	362	176	156	135	87	58	321.723	
Maximillian Mesrasrik Kun	8	42	50	131	146	163	141	150	302	153	221	200	259.289	
Abednego Mathew Dongobir	5	7	28	93	98	121	154	184	244	370	200	203	225.060	
Valid votes	1,707													
Invalid votes	49													
Total votes	1,756													
Source: Electoral Commission of Nauru

=== Yaren ===
Candidate	Preference votes							Total	Notes
Candidate	1	2	3	4	5	6	7	Total	Notes
Charmaine Scotty	401	293	78	49	62	101	87	627.412	Re-elected
Isabella Dageago	320	110	89	72	80	130	270	498.905	Re-elected
Hunter Itaia	240	180	120	94	99	159	179	465.371	
Dagan Ashly Scot Kaierua	39	137	236	264	215	125	55	323.857	
Dekoga Dowedia	22	125	224	239	182	145	134	298.626	
Dominic Rumple Cain	17	134	163	233	223	171	130	288.255	
Caruso Amwano	32	92	161	120	210	240	216	274.524	
Valid votes	1,071								
Invalid votes	14								
Total votes	1,085								
Source: Electoral Commission of Nauru

== Aftermath ==
2025 Nauruan presidential election
- 14 October 2025
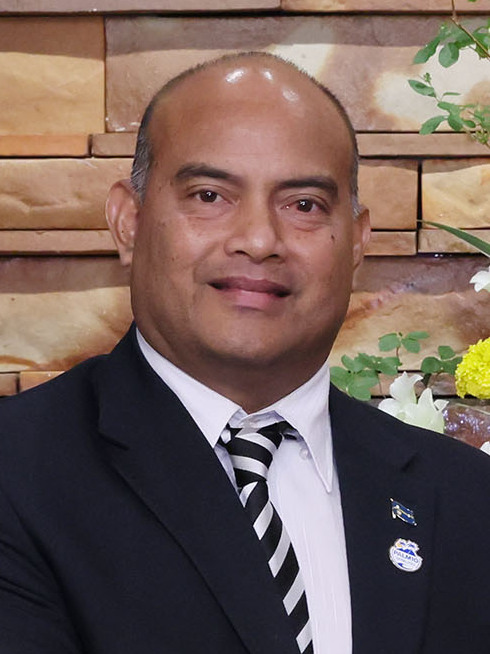
Nominee	David Adeang
Party	Independent
Electoral vote	18
Percentage	100% (de facto)
President before election
David Adeang
Independent
Elected President
David Adeang
Independent

Following the parliamentary election, Marcus Stephen was re-elected speaker, and Isabella Dageago was elected deputy speaker. An indirect presidential election was held on 14 October. Incumbent President David Adeang was re-elected unopposed.
