= 2019 Nauruan parliamentary election =

- 24 August 2019

All 19 seats in Parliament
President before election
Baron Waqa
President after election
Lionel Aingimea

Parliamentary elections were held in Nauru on 24 August 2019. President Baron Waqa lost his seat in Boe Constituency, making him ineligible for a third term. Following the elections, Lionel Aingimea was elected President, winning a parliamentary vote 12–6 against David Adeang.

== Electoral system ==
The 19 members of Parliament were elected from eight multi-member constituencies using the Dowdall system, a version of ranked voting; voters rank candidates, with the votes counted as a fraction of one divided by the ranking number (e.g. a candidate ranked second will be scored as ½); the candidates with the highest total were elected.

== Conduct ==
Speaker Cyril Buraman issued a notice in the Republic of Nauru Government Gazette on 15 July 2019 announcing the date of the general election was 24 August. The 2019 general election was observed by two international organizations: the Pacific Islands Forum and the Commonwealth Secretariat.

== Results ==
Out of 7,508 registered voters, 7,167 cast a vote, resulting in a turnout of 95.46%. 7,037 votes were valid and the remaining 130 either blank or invalid.

=== Aiwo ===
| Candidate | Preference votes | | | | | | | | Total | Notes |
| Candidate | 1 | 2 | 3 | 4 | 5 | 6 | 7 | 8 | Total | Notes |
|---|---|---|---|---|---|---|---|---|---|---|
| Rennier Gadabu | 177 | 189 | 106 | 81 | 69 | 54 | 97 | 35 | 368.115 | Elected |
| Milton Dube | 193 | 94 | 54 | 55 | 56 | 50 | 106 | 200 | 331.426 | Re-elected |
| Aaron Cook | 170 | 128 | 74 | 55 | 41 | 55 | 133 | 152 | 327.783 | Unseated |
| Delvin Thoma | 99 | 113 | 159 | 168 | 102 | 87 | 55 | 25 | 296.382 | |
| Preston Thoma | 102 | 59 | 69 | 78 | 123 | 125 | 95 | 157 | 252.630 | |
| Dantes Tsitsi | 33 | 58 | 118 | 144 | 137 | 154 | 100 | 64 | 212.686 | |
| Evi Agir | 26 | 89 | 99 | 108 | 153 | 150 | 121 | 62 | 211.136 | |
| Lance Agir | 8 | 78 | 129 | 119 | 127 | 133 | 101 | 113 | 195.870 | |
| Invalid/blank votes | | | | | | | | | 15 | |
| Total | | | | | | | | | 823 | |
Source: Nauru Electoral Commission

=== Anabar ===
| Candidate | Preference votes | | | | | | Total | Notes |
| Candidate | 1 | 2 | 3 | 4 | 5 | 6 | Total | Notes |
|---|---|---|---|---|---|---|---|---|
| Maverick Eoe | 157 | 128 | 76 | 71 | 56 | 65 | 286.117 | Elected |
| Pyon Deiye | 150 | 107 | 95 | 64 | 68 | 69 | 276.267 | Elected |
| Ludwig Scotty | 116 | 37 | 54 | 56 | 59 | 231 | 216.800 | |
| Riddell Akua | 83 | 73 | 61 | 86 | 180 | 70 | 209.000 | Unseated |
| Jeb Bop | 29 | 116 | 158 | 104 | 96 | 50 | 193.200 | |
| Transom Duburiya | 18 | 92 | 109 | 172 | 94 | 68 | 173.467 | |
| Invalid/blank votes | | | | | | | 8 | |
| Total | | | | | | | 561 | |
Source: Nauru Electoral Commission

=== Anetan ===
| Candidate | Preference votes | | | | | | | | Total | Notes |
| Candidate | 1 | 2 | 3 | 4 | 5 | 6 | 7 | 8 | Total | Notes |
|---|---|---|---|---|---|---|---|---|---|---|
| Timothy Ika | 412 | 253 | 49 | 22 | 20 | 24 | 79 | 50 | 585.869 | Elected |
| Marcus Stephen | 158 | 100 | 72 | 59 | 51 | 65 | 214 | 190 | 322.105 | Elected |
| Antonius Atuen | 118 | 118 | 103 | 92 | 114 | 174 | 160 | 30 | 312.740 | |
| Cyril Buraman | 163 | 71 | 47 | 34 | 50 | 84 | 91 | 369 | 305.792 | Unseated |
| Vaiuli Amoe | 3 | 133 | 269 | 218 | 111 | 87 | 54 | 34 | 262.331 | |
| Konrad Ika | 37 | 78 | 178 | 186 | 194 | 143 | 51 | 42 | 257.002 | |
| Joseph Harris | 15 | 109 | 96 | 175 | 216 | 130 | 121 | 47 | 233.277 | |
| Darryl Tom | 3 | 47 | 95 | 123 | 153 | 202 | 139 | 147 | 191.415 | |
| Invalid/blank votes | | | | | | | | | 15 | |
| Total | | | | | | | | | 924 | |
Source: Nauru Electoral Commission

=== Boe ===
| Candidate | Preference votes | | | | | Total | Notes |
| Candidate | 1 | 2 | 3 | 4 | 5 | Total | Notes |
|---|---|---|---|---|---|---|---|
| Martin Hunt | 261 | 164 | 161 | 130 | 95 | 448.167 | Elected |
| Asterio Appi | 204 | 201 | 142 | 174 | 90 | 413.333 | Re-elected |
| Baron Waqa | 188 | 79 | 58 | 132 | 354 | 350.633 | Unseated |
| Mathew Batsiua | 144 | 98 | 189 | 232 | 148 | 343.600 | |
| Brett Satto | 14 | 269 | 261 | 143 | 124 | 296.050 | |
| Invalid/blank votes | | | | | | 5 | |
| Total | | | | | | 816 | |
Source: Nauru Electoral Commission

=== Buada ===
| Candidate | Preference votes | | | | | | | Total | Notes |
| Candidate | 1 | 2 | 3 | 4 | 5 | 6 | 7 | Total | Notes |
|---|---|---|---|---|---|---|---|---|---|
| Shadlog Bernicke | 270 | 102 | 29 | 48 | 37 | 68 | 119 | 378.400 | Re-elected |
| Bingham Agir | 174 | 155 | 67 | 47 | 40 | 100 | 90 | 323.107 | Re-elected |
| Linkbelt Detabene | 92 | 74 | 108 | 76 | 79 | 71 | 173 | 236.348 | |
| Sean Halstead | 37 | 115 | 133 | 111 | 112 | 134 | 31 | 215.745 | |
| Arrow Depuane | 53 | 56 | 86 | 112 | 185 | 98 | 83 | 202.857 | |
| Rowan Detenamo | 15 | 101 | 128 | 181 | 97 | 97 | 54 | 196.698 | |
| Richie Halstead | 32 | 70 | 122 | 98 | 123 | 105 | 123 | 191.838 | |
| Invalid/blank votes | | | | | | | | 7 | |
| Total | | | | | | | | 680 | |
Source: Nauru Electoral Commission

=== Meneng ===
| Candidate | Preference votes | | | | | | | | | Total | Notes |
| Candidate | 1 | 2 | 3 | 4 | 5 | 6 | 7 | 8 | 9 | Total | Notes |
|---|---|---|---|---|---|---|---|---|---|---|---|
| Lionel Aingimea | 256 | 118 | 58 | 66 | 64 | 104 | 120 | 149 | 186 | 437.401 | Re-elected |
| Khyde Menke | 159 | 226 | 154 | 163 | 182 | 99 | 39 | 57 | 42 | 434.346 | Elected |
| Tawaki Kam | 207 | 104 | 116 | 69 | 73 | 127 | 98 | 135 | 192 | 402.892 | Re-elected |
| Jesse Jeremiah | 172 | 129 | 150 | 112 | 99 | 111 | 99 | 176 | 73 | 397.054 | |
| Vodrick Detsiogo | 142 | 162 | 142 | 90 | 95 | 79 | 200 | 102 | 109 | 378.433 | Unseated |
| Squire Jeremiah | 149 | 141 | 112 | 96 | 83 | 99 | 116 | 113 | 212 | 368.185 | |
| Ronay Dick | 11 | 125 | 169 | 206 | 183 | 154 | 122 | 92 | 59 | 279.084 | |
| Paner Baguga | 12 | 54 | 112 | 183 | 186 | 159 | 168 | 147 | 100 | 239.269 | |
| Chubasco Diranga | 13 | 62 | 108 | 136 | 156 | 189 | 159 | 150 | 148 | 234.609 | |
| Invalid/blank votes | | | | | | | | | | 13 | |
| Total | | | | | | | | | | 1,134 | |
Source: Nauru Electoral Commission

=== Ubenide ===
There was a recount in the Ubenide Constituency after six ballot papers were found in the Nauruan parliament chamber. The results were ultimately unchanged.

| Candidate | Preference votes | | | | | | | | | | | | Total | Notes |
| Candidate | 1 | 2 | 3 | 4 | 5 | 6 | 7 | 8 | 9 | 10 | 11 | 12 | Total | Notes |
|---|---|---|---|---|---|---|---|---|---|---|---|---|---|---|
| David Adeang | 383 | 282 | 214 | 153 | 98 | 45 | 54 | 46 | 55 | 52 | 55 | 83 | 697.375 | Re-elected |
| Russ Kun | 241 | 233 | 389 | 176 | 87 | 39 | 49 | 61 | 73 | 67 | 73 | 32 | 593.806 | Re-elected |
| Reagan Aliklik | 247 | 190 | 163 | 135 | 121 | 88 | 74 | 56 | 53 | 55 | 76 | 262 | 526.653 | Elected |
| Wawani Dowiyogo | 224 | 208 | 133 | 106 | 123 | 81 | 87 | 88 | 90 | 64 | 259 | 57 | 505.057 | Elected |
| Ranin Akua | 198 | 224 | 95 | 98 | 52 | 69 | 58 | 49 | 73 | 137 | 126 | 341 | 464.160 | Unseated |
| Gabrissa Hartman | 93 | 154 | 216 | 377 | 113 | 89 | 56 | 84 | 110 | 108 | 78 | 42 | 425.796 | Unseated |
| Vyko Adeang | 94 | 61 | 64 | 89 | 234 | 141 | 164 | 184 | 187 | 144 | 85 | 73 | 333.800 | |
| Kay Aliklik | 4 | 39 | 69 | 90 | 198 | 331 | 194 | 162 | 129 | 130 | 100 | 74 | 254.322 | |
| Aloysius Amwano | 9 | 47 | 39 | 57 | 127 | 176 | 167 | 361 | 201 | 133 | 112 | 91 | 236.864 | |
| Maximillian Kun | 5 | 34 | 60 | 75 | 161 | 146 | 243 | 137 | 170 | 171 | 241 | 77 | 233.437 | |
| Renos Agege | 15 | 30 | 51 | 87 | 107 | 142 | 134 | 132 | 129 | 293 | 144 | 256 | 227.517 | |
| Darned Dongobir | 7 | 18 | 27 | 77 | 99 | 173 | 240 | 160 | 250 | 166 | 171 | 132 | 218.092 | |
| Invalid/blank votes | | | | | | | | | | | | | 62 | |
| Total | | | | | | | | | | | | | 1,582 | |
Source: Nauru Electoral Commission

=== Yaren ===
| Candidate | Preference votes | | | | | Total | Notes |
| Candidate | 1 | 2 | 3 | 4 | 5 | Total | Notes |
|---|---|---|---|---|---|---|---|
| Charmaine Scotty | 444 | 94 | 37 | 28 | 39 | 518.133 | Re-elected |
| Isabella Dageago | 81 | 128 | 153 | 148 | 132 | 257.400 | Elected |
| Kieren Keke | 69 | 107 | 117 | 196 | 153 | 241.100 | Unseated |
| Dominic Cain | 34 | 178 | 130 | 155 | 145 | 234.083 | |
| John Julius | 14 | 135 | 205 | 115 | 173 | 213.183 | |
| Invalid/blank votes | | | | | | 5 | |
| Total | | | | | | 647 | |
Source: Nauru Electoral Commission

== Presidential election ==
Following the elections, the newly elected MPs elected the president, who was required by the constitution to be a member of parliament. Incumbent president Baron Waqa lost his seat in parliament, which meant he was ineligible. Lionel Aingimea defeated David Adeang of Nauru First by twelve votes to six.
