= 2016 Nauruan parliamentary election =

- 9 July 2016
- Presidential vote
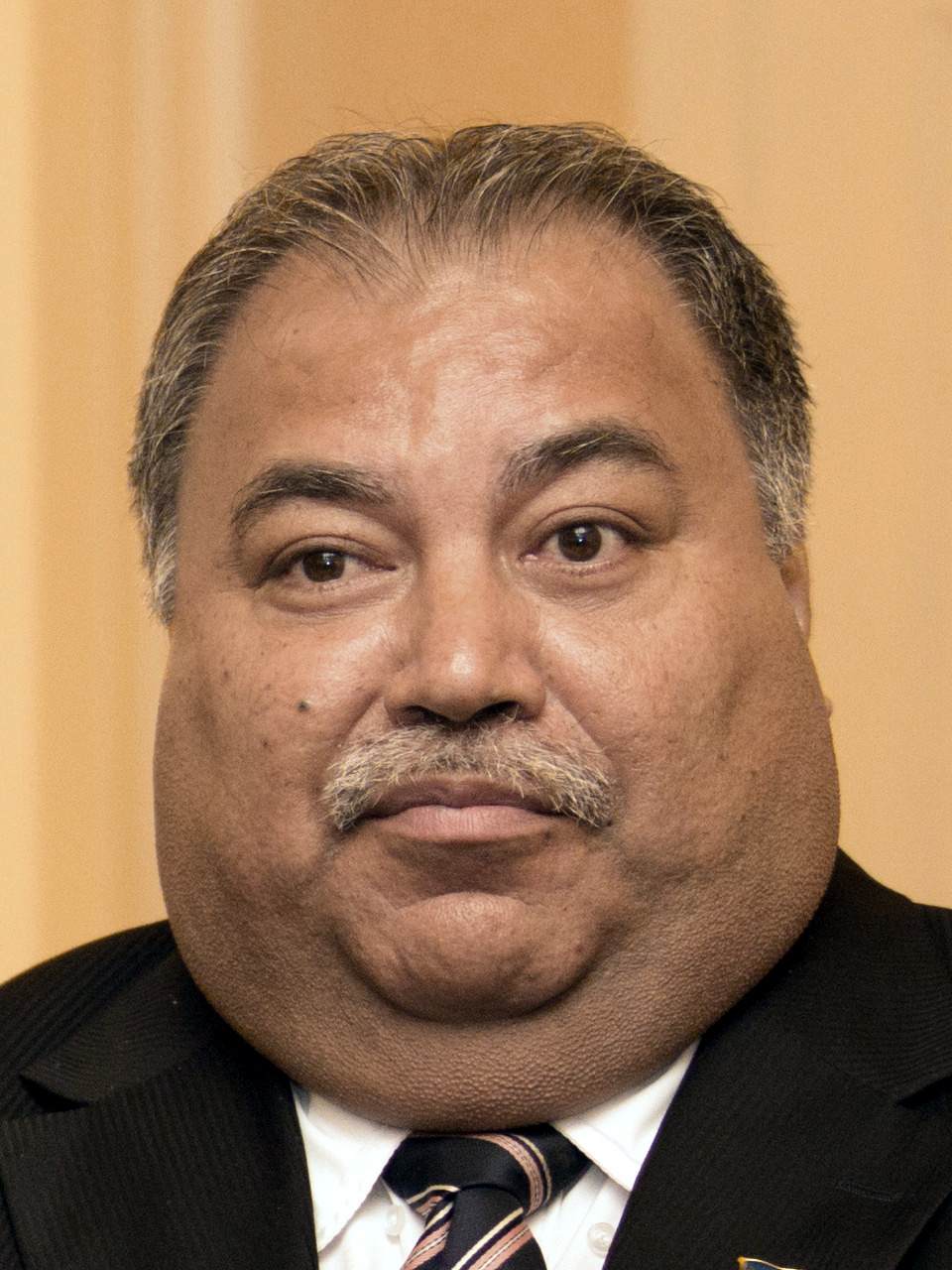

Nominee	Baron Waqa	Riddell Akua
Electoral vote	16	2
President before election
Baron Waqa
President-designate
Baron Waqa

Parliamentary elections were held in Nauru on 9 July 2016. Parliament was dissolved by President Baron Waqa on 10 June after it completed its three-year term. Speaker Ludwig Scotty called the elections for 9 July, with nominations taking place between 19 and 25 June.

== Electoral system ==
The 19 members of Parliament were elected from eight multi-member constituencies using the Dowdall system, a version of ranked voting; voters ranked candidates, with the votes counted as a fraction of 1 divided by the ranking number (e.g. a candidate ranked second will be scored as ½); the candidates with the highest total are elected.

== Conduct ==
Opposition politicians in Nauru expressed concerns about the legitimacy of the election. In December 2015, opposition MP Mathew Batsiua accused the government of using public funds to buy favor through excessive, free inaugural flights. In February 2016 another suspended opposition MP, former president Sprent Dabwido, claimed that a new law requiring public servants to resign from their jobs three months ahead of election day was a tactic used to suppress prospective candidates from running. Batsiua additionally claimed in March 2016 that the increase in candidacy fees from US$74 to US$1500 was a suppression tactic. Responding to the increase in candidacy price, some prospective parliamentary candidates turned to crowdfunding. By May 2016, 18 prospective candidates had filed an application to the Supreme Court of Nauru to challenge the increased candidacy price. In June, parliament reduced the candidacy fee from US$1500 to US$500, and abolished the requirement for public servants to resign their jobs three months before the election.

In March 2016, former presidents Dabwido and Marcus Stephen accused the Baron Waqa government of attempting to rig the 2016 elections by suppressing protest, press access, and social media websites, as well as creating new barriers for prospective candidates, among other things. They requested representatives from the Pacific Islands Forum (PIF) and the Commonwealth Secretariat serve as international observers for the elections. The PIF and the Commonwealth Secretariat signalled they would require an invitation from the government to observe the elections. President Waqa expressed an openness to international observers. By June, both the PIF and Commonwealth Secretariat confirmed that they would observe the election. The observer teams arrived in July. The Commonwealth Secretariat's team was led by Anote Tong, former president of Kiribati.

Ahead of the election, Dabwido accused the government of preventing local media from running opposition campaign ads, as well as intervening with the police commissioner, preventing the opposition from holding a campaign rally. Communications Minister Shadlog Bernicke explained that Nauru TV does not air political ads for either the government or opposition, and accused the opposition of using the foreign press to spread disinformation. Bernicke further accused Dabwido of "political point scoring" and attempting to influence the international observers with lies.

Both the PIF and Commonwealth Secretariat found the 2016 parliamentary elections to be free and fair.

== Results ==
Voting took place on 9 July, except in the Aiwo Constituency, where it was halted and delayed until 11 July. This was due to a legal dispute brought by Tazio Gideon, who challenged the Electoral Commission's refusal of his nomination to stand in the election.

Constituency	Candidate	Preference votes																Total	Notes
Constituency	Candidate	1	2	3	4	5	6	7	8	9	10	11	12	13	14	15	16	Total	Notes
Aiwo	Milton Dube	224	238	62	42	107												395.57	Elected
Aiwo	Aaron Cook	243	158	69	115	88												391.35	Elected
Aiwo	Dantes Tsitsi	149	62	95	129	238												291.52	
Aiwo	Lance Agir	35	102	275	164	97												238.07	
Aiwo	Preston Thoma	22	113	181	214	143												220.93	
Aiwo	Invalid/blank votes																	12	
Aiwo	Total																	685	
Constituency	Candidate	Preference votes																Total	Notes
Constituency	Candidate	1	2	3	4	5	6	7	8	9	10	11	12	13	14	15	16	Total	Notes
Anabar	Riddell Akua	134	103	78	59	57	103	61										263.53	Elected
Anabar	Jaden Dogireiy	120	105	84	71	65	57	93										254.04	Elected
Anabar	Ludwig Scotty	116	95	86	74	60	71	93										247.79	
Anabar	Pyon Deiye	89	76	96	109	76	81	68										224.66	
Anabar	Jeb Bop	76	77	79	96	124	83	60										212.04	
Anabar	Dawson Agege	45	49	78	88	93	101	141										173.08	
Anabar	Corey Menke	15	89	95	97	120	96	83										167.27	
Anabar	Invalid/blank votes																	8	
Anabar	Total																	603	
Constituency	Candidate	Preference votes																Total	Notes
Constituency	Candidate	1	2	3	4	5	6	7	8	9	10	11	12	13	14	15	16	Total	Notes
Anetan	Sean Oppenheimer	148	261	101	40	26	31	40	67	67								354.07	Elected
Anetan	Cyril Buraman	221	52	43	48	29	24	67	50	247								326.40	Elected
Anetan	Marcus Stephen	146	135	58	54	41	37	66	110	134								298.77	
Anetan	Antonius Atuen	137	98	89	82	53	39	42	183	58								288.59	
Anetan	Geoffrey Thoma	60	42	136	101	112	157	89	50	34								222.89	
Anetan	Fabian Ika	24	80	116	160	130	102	89	44	36								207.88	
Anetan	Landon Deireragea	29	18	96	104	108	155	130	81	60								178.80	
Anetan	Joseph Harris	12	43	72	118	164	121	86	86	79								171.78	
Anetan	Darryl Tom	4	49	73	76	118	114	169	110	68								159.88	
Anetan	Invalid/blank votes																	19	
Anetan	Total																	800	
Constituency	Candidate	Preference votes																Total	Notes
Constituency	Candidate	1	2	3	4	5	6	7	8	9	10	11	12	13	14	15	16	Total	Notes
Boe	Asterio Appi	123	95	120	51	26	19	25	88	22								248.63	Elected
Boe	Baron Waqa	151	80	43	23	17	31	24	60	140								246.13	Elected
Boe	Mathew Batsiua	144	46	42	17	20	23	25	79	173								225.75	
Boe	Mike Dagiaro	65	146	50	40	40	45	58	97	28								203.69	
Boe	Abraham Aremwa	38	45	94	102	84	67	91	27	21								164.01	
Boe	Dale Cecil	17	77	52	64	82	84	98	56	39								144.57	
Boe	Geoffrey Harris	20	37	59	86	111	124	62	46	24								139.81	
Boe	Randwick Capelle	5	34	80	114	88	74	89	37	48								129.77	
Boe	Kinza Clodumar	6	13	32	72	98	101	96	81	70								109.22	
Boe	Invalid/blank votes																	10	
Boe	Total																	579	
Constituency	Candidate	Preference votes																Total	Notes
Constituency	Candidate	1	2	3	4	5	6	7	8	9	10	11	12	13	14	15	16	Total	Notes
Buada	Shadlog Bernicke	253	82	87	155													361.75	Elected
Buada	Bingham Agir	156	118	184	119													306.08	Elected
Buada	Sean Halstead	61	276	149	91													271.42	
Buada	Linkbelt Detabene	107	101	157	212													262.83	
Buada	Invalid/blank votes																	3	
Buada	Total																	580	
Constituency	Candidate	Preference votes																Total	Notes
Constituency	Candidate	1	2	3	4	5	6	7	8	9	10	11	12	13	14	15	16	Total	Notes
Meneng	Tawaki Kam	282	284	112	63	29	23	23	29	38	139	80						519.02	Elected
Meneng	Lionel Aingimea	237	198	81	43	34	32	63	48	69	74	223						436.22	Elected
Meneng	Vodrick Detsiogo	123	108	132	106	70	152	141	97	101	43	29						337.26	Elected
Meneng	Sprent Dabwido	132	125	81	69	82	79	44	67	71	191	161						324.60	
Meneng	Squire Jeremiah	89	155	110	80	68	52	65	84	80	165	154						304.61	
Meneng	Robert Timothy	80	59	88	155	148	128	140	97	116	67	24						282.41	
Meneng	Elvin Brechtefeld	43	25	163	161	106	106	115	112	109	70	92						246.85	
Meneng	Deci Temaki	42	39	72	107	244	136	114	130	74	85	59						238.34	
Meneng	Rykers Solomon	30	51	76	96	75	160	156	154	152	78	74						219.45	
Meneng	Bweresallas Temaki	14	39	67	151	167	161	143	107	84	76	93						213.01	
Meneng	Doneke Kepae	30	17	121	68	81	76	100	177	205	116	111						205.58	
Meneng	Invalid/blank votes																	31	
Meneng	Total																	1,133	
Constituency	Candidate	Preference votes																Total	Notes
Constituency	Candidate	1	2	3	4	5	6	7	8	9	10	11	12	13	14	15	16	Total	Notes
Ubenide	David Adeang	271	244	162	90	74	46	37	31	37	29	42	43	43	106	76	174	542.36	Elected
Ubenide	Ranin Akua	269	100	244	67	55	60	57	48	46	27	45	38	32	86	150	181	497.21	Elected
Ubenide	Russ Kun	137	192	240	236	210	72	69	55	41	41	32	34	30	28	50	38	467.15	Elected
Ubenide	Valdon Dowiyogo	160	262	90	63	47	50	31	47	64	58	69	67	75	147	159	116	423.67	Elected
Ubenide	Reagan Aliklik	108	136	99	135	159	92	81	67	68	57	51	51	56	49	88	208	358.65	
Ubenide	Vyko Adeang	134	62	55	173	154	77	66	87	77	119	86	101	124	85	67	38	349.66	
Ubenide	Gabrissa Hartman	86	93	160	123	121	173	152	94	73	77	61	128	70	43	29	22	346.87	
Ubenide	David Detageauwa	92	74	69	87	75	77	77	89	109	125	117	107	183	95	74	55	297.11	
Ubenide	Freddie Pitcher	80	95	48	55	82	76	58	66	65	74	84	129	119	82	149	243	275.99	
Ubenide	Aloysius Amwano	57	36	66	113	62	77	83	77	92	105	120	126	121	196	104	70	248.71	
Ubenide	Fabian Ribauw	48	57	55	64	90	98	99	94	125	105	139	134	137	80	116	64	247.24	
Ubenide	Albert Teimitsi	26	30	46	67	97	128	178	110	118	116	194	100	69	94	88	44	224.31	
Ubenide	David Dowiyogo	14	25	56	78	85	137	136	120	203	109	110	93	146	96	61	36	214.54	
Ubenide	Kay Aliklik	6	30	53	76	82	155	192	107	172	177	105	87	87	60	71	45	212.83	
Ubenide	Renos Agege	13	40	42	42	57	108	100	126	107	162	137	151	129	135	91	65	199.76	
Ubenide	Darnard Dongobir	4	21	27	35	56	85	93	281	108	122	114	114	84	123	131	107	180.76	
Ubenide	Invalid/blank votes																	74	
Ubenide	Total																	1,579	
Constituency	Candidate	Preference votes																Total	Notes
Constituency	Candidate	1	2	3	4	5	6	7	8	9	10	11	12	13	14	15	16	Total	Notes
Yaren	Charmaine Scotty	255	103	33	24	51	38											340.03	Elected
Yaren	Kieren Keke	122	52	46	82	65	137											219.67	Elected
Yaren	Robbie Eoe	71	132	56	51	96	98											203.95	
Yaren	John Mackay	11	119	128	123	82	41											167.15	
Yaren	Daigon Julius	41	35	95	111	118	104											158.85	
Yaren	Brian Amwano	4	62	144	117	91	86											144.78	
Yaren	Invalid/blank votes																	6	
Yaren	Total																	510	
Source: Nauru Electoral Commission

== Presidential election ==
On 13 July the newly elected MPs elected the president, who was required by the constitution be a member of parliament. All new members joined the presidential majority, allowing Waqa to be re-elected president by sixteen votes to two against opposition Nauru First candidate Riddell Akua.

Cyril Buraman was elected Speaker. Ludwig Scotty, the speaker of the previous Parliament, had lost his seat in Anabar. On 30 May 2019, there was a by-election after MP Jaden Dogireiy was disqualified from parliament, in which Scotty was elected.

In September Dale Cecil, a candidate in Boe Constituency, filed an election petition against Waqa, accusing him of bribery and breaking advertisement law. Dabwido filed an election petition against Lionel Aingimea and Tawaki Kam in the Meneng Constituency. Both petitions were thrown out due to legal technicalities.
