= June 2010 Nauruan parliamentary election =

- 19 June 2010

All 18 seats in the Parliament of Nauru
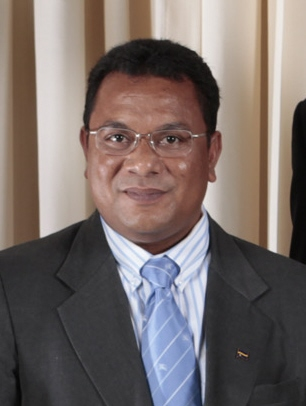

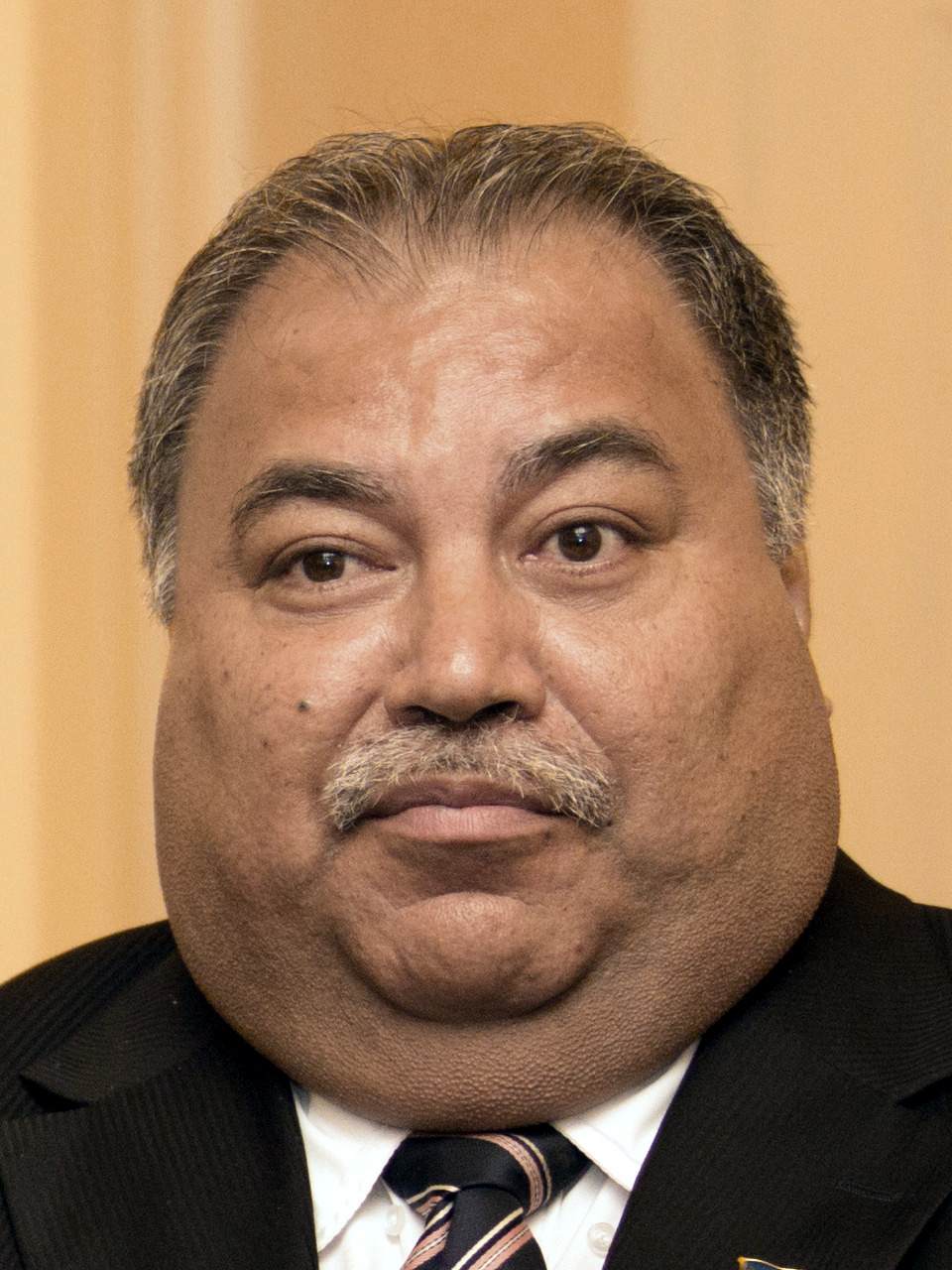
	First party	Second party
Leader	Marcus Stephen	Baron Waqa
Grouping	Supporters of Stephen	Opponents of Stephen
Last election	9 seats	9 seats
Seats won	9	8
Seat change	Steady	▼1
President before election
Marcus Stephen
Independent
President-designate
Marcus Stephen
Independent

Early parliamentary elections were held in Nauru on 19 June 2010 after the previous parliamentary election in April 2010 had resulted in a deadlock between government and opposition, tied at nine seats each. This led to an extended state of emergency in Nauru as a result of this election.

== Background ==
The election occurred during a state of emergency imposed by President of Nauru Marcus Stephen. Voters were given just one week's notice for the date of the election.

== Results ==
The result was no clear majority, meaning a hung parliament.

One MP belonging to the opposition, Dantes Tsitsi, failed to be re-elected, while all 17 others were re-elected. Independent MP Milton Dube holds the balance of power. The Nauru Parliament's two groups must compete for his support. Dube was elected in Aiwo constituency, unseating Dantes Tsitsi of the Opposition. The new MP declared himself independent, and stated he would support the side which would do the most for his constituency. He wants to reduce the levels of phosphate dust from a problematic drying plant. The MP in favour of government, Doctor Kieren Keke, planned to discuss the matter with Dube within a week of his election. Parliament have scheduled a sitting on the Tuesday morning following the election.

Party	Votes	%	Seats
Supporters of Marcus Stephen			9
Opponents of Marcus Stephen			8
Independents			1
Total			18
Valid votes	5,180	97.98	
Invalid/blank votes	107	2.02	
Total votes	5,287	100.00	
Registered voters/turnout	5,704	92.69	
Source: Australia Network News, IPU

=== By constituency ===
Constituency	Candidate	Votes	Notes
Aiwo	Milton Dube	305.183	Elected
Aiwo	Godfrey Thoma	299.083	Re-elected
Aiwo	Dantes Tsitsi	295.650	Unseated
Aiwo	Aaron Cook	269.450	
Aiwo	Preston Jovani Thoma	250.867	
Aiwo	Invalid/blank votes	3	
Aiwo	Total votes cast	625	
Anabar	Riddell Akua	283.326	Re-elected
Anabar	Ludwig Scotty	261.206	Re-elected
Anabar	Tyrone Deiye	245.530	
Anabar	Jeb Nobob Bop	138.237	
Anabar	David Peter Gadaraoa	130.708	
Anabar	Melissa Neirina Ika	130.413	
Anabar	Vincent Scotty	129.906	
Anabar	Espen Jubal Fritz	110.267	
Anabar	Invalid/blank votes	15	
Anabar	Total votes cast	541	
Anetan	Marcus Stephen	349.617	Re-elected
Anetan	Landon Deireragea	335.433	Re-elected
Anetan	Cyril Buraman	317.717	
Anetan	Cheyenne Timothy Ika	184.833	
Anetan	Begg Bagadouwe Adire	183.217	
Anetan	Creiden Fritz	172.683	
Anetan	Invalid/blank votes	9	
Anetan	Total votes cast	639	
Boe	Mathew Batsiua	281.900	Re-elected
Boe	Baron Waqa	277.417	Re-elected
Boe	Vollmer Mercury Appi	218.50	
Boe	Abraham Aremwa	214.533	
Boe	Joy Edith Heine	188.483	
Boe	Invalid/blank votes	3	
Boe	Total votes cast	520	
Buada	Shadlog Bernicke	252.767	Re-elected
Buada	Roland Kun	232.317	Re-elected
Buada	Alexander Stephen	175.300	
Buada	Vinson Franco Detenamo	156.850	
Buada	Monte Depaune	155.050	
Buada	Johan Scotty	149.817	
Buada	Invalid/blank votes	3	
Buada	Total votes cast	461	
Meneng	Rykers Solomon	394.445	Re-elected
Meneng	Sprent Dabwido	368.577	Re-elected
Meneng	Lyn-Wannan Kam	335.759	
Meneng	Doneke Jim Benedict Kepae	197.069	
Meneng	Alvin Harris	192.717	
Meneng	Elvin Squire Brechtefeld	191.166	
Meneng	Darius Rock	177.362	
Meneng	Roxen Debagabene Agadio	168.341	
Meneng	Darkey Jeremiah	168.031	
Meneng	Simpson Simon	167.282	
Meneng	Invalid/blank votes	21	
Meneng	Total votes cast	827	
Ubenide	David Adeang	422.974	Re-elected
Ubenide	Frederick Pitcher	414.240	Re-elected
Ubenide	Aloysius Amwano	393.787	Re-elected
Ubenide	Valdon Dowiyogo	357.014	Re-elected
Ubenide	Ranin Akua	313.724	
Ubenide	Julian Itsimaera	283.724	
Ubenide	George Giovanni Gioura	255.857	
Ubenide	Vyko Pentax Adeang	240.325	
Ubenide	Fabian Ribauw	228.040	
Ubenide	Maria Gaiyabu	202.255	
Ubenide	Greta Diva Harris	192.848	
Ubenide	Renos Renige Agege	184.514	
Ubenide	David Corey Dowiyogo	181.250	
Ubenide	Skipper Diovanni Hiram	174.567	
Ubenide	Darnard Dongobir	166.621	
Ubenide	Invalid/blank votes	50	
Ubenide	Total votes cast	1,259	
Yaren	Dominic Tabuna	254.667	Re-elected
Yaren	Kieren Keke	232.167	Re-elected
Yaren	Charmaine Scotty	206.483	
Yaren	John Daigon Julius	125.517	
Yaren	Brian Amwano	121.900	
Yaren	Invalid/blank votes	3	
Yaren	Total votes cast	415	
Source: Republic of Nauru Government Gazette

== Presidential election ==
Following parliamentary elections, newly elected MPs elect a president from amongst their number. After the April parliamentary elections, the presidential election was attempted to be held on 3 June and 4 June 2010, but failed both times.

Following the new parliamentary elections on 19 June, Aloysius Amwano was elected as speaker on 30 June, but demanded that Stephen stand down as president. Stephen's followers agreed to this, but only if the new president came from their ranks, with their preferred nominee being Kieren Keke. However, there are two other contenders, Baron Waqa (the opposition leader) and Godfrey Thoma. Another attempt at electing a president was set for 6 July.

Although Rykers Solomon, an opposition MP, joined the government on 6 July, but Amwano nonetheless refused to allow a motion to elect the president, suspending parliament until 8 July. Amwano was then dismissed on 7 July by Stephen, but refused to quit. In a short parliamentary session held on 9 July, Deputy Speaker Landon Deireragea announced that he had assumed the Speaker's position.

By 30 July 2010 parliament had still had not sat since the sacking of Amwano and Stephen extended the state of emergency by 21 days. The emergency was subsequently extended several times continued into October.

The deadlock was finally broken when former president Ludwig Scotty accepted the nomination to become speaker, and Stephen was elected over opposition MP Milton Dube in a secret vote with 11 to 6 votes on 1 November 2010.
