= Cabinet of Nauru =

The Cabinet of Nauru, officially the Cabinet of Naoero, is the executive branch of the government of the Republic of Nauru, a small island nation in the Pacific Ocean. Article 17 (1.) of the Constitution of Nauru provides for the "executive authority of Nauru" to be vested in "a Cabinet constituted as provided by this Part" with the "general direction and control of the government of Nauru", specified in Article 17 (2.) as being "collectively responsible" to the Parliament of Nauru. The Cabinet is directly appointed by the President of Nauru, and comprises the president, who presides over meetings of the Cabinet, and either four or five members of the parliament. The president is also responsible for assigning Members of the Cabinet, including himself, "responsibility for any business of the government of Nauru", as ministers. Members of the Cabinet are required to swear or affirm an oath of office prior to being appointed.

== Cabinet Office ==
The Cabinet Office of Nauru serves as the central administrative body supporting the Cabinet and the executive branch of government. It provides coordination and secretariat services for Cabinet meetings, manages official records and decisions, and assists in the development and implementation of government policies.

The Office is headed by the Secretary to Cabinet, who oversees Cabinet administration and ensures the effective coordination of government business. Working closely with the President, Cabinet Ministers, government ministries, and public officials, the Cabinet Office facilitates communication across government, monitors the implementation of Cabinet decisions, and supports the delivery of the government's priorities and objectives.

Office	Incumbent
Secretary to Cabinet	Ophelia Caleb
Deputy Secretary to Cabinet	Sierra Engar
Assistant Secretary to Cabinet	Helena Ika
Archives and Data Officer	Kyla Akua

== Cabinet portfolios ==
- Chairman of the Cabinet (as President of Nauru)
- Vice President of Nauru
- Minister Assisting the President of Nauru
- Minister of Finance
- Minister of Foreign Affairs and Trade
- Minister of Justice
- Minster of Health
- Minster Responsible for the Nauru Phosphate Royalties Trust

== Current Cabinet (2025–present) ==
The following cabinet was appointed by David Adeang on 30 October 2025, after he was reelected President of Nauru, following the 2025 general election on 11 October 2025.

Name	Portfolios
His Excellency David Adeang, MP	Chairman of the Cabinet (as President), Finance & Sustainable Development, Public Service, National Security
Hon. Lionel Aingimea, MP	Vice President, Minister Assisting the President of Nauru, Foreign Affairs & Trade, Justice, Border Control, Maritime
Hon. Charmaine Scotty, MP	Land Management, Community & Youth, Women & Social Development, Culture & Tourism
Hon. Shadlog Bernicke, MP	Infrastructure, ICT, Media, Telecommunications, Utilities, Phosphate Trust
Hon. Reagan Aliklik, MP	Transport and Fisheries
Hon. Jesse Jeremiah, MP	National Emergency Services, Sports
Hon. Asterio Appi, MP	Education, Training, Professional Development
Hon.Maverick Eoe, MP	Commerce, Foreign Investment, state enterprises, Consumer Protection Authority
Hon. Delvin O' Thoma, MP	Climate Change & National Resilience, Environmental Management & Agriculture
