= Roland Kun =

Nauruan politician

The Honourable Roland Kun MP

Member of the Nauruan Parliament for Buada
- In office 2004–2016
- Preceded by: Vinson Detenamo
- Succeeded by: Bingham Agir

Personal details
- Born: 6 May 1970 (age 56) Nauru
- Party: Naoero Amo
- Spouse: Katy Le Roy
- Children: 3
- Education: James Cook University
- Profession: public servant

Roland Tullen Kun (born 6 May 1970) is a Nauruan politician and Member of Parliament.

== Political career ==
=== MP and Minister ===
Kun was elected in 2004 to serve as a Member of the Parliament of Nauru and served as Minister of Justice.

Kun was elected to the seat of Buada in 2004, 2007, 2008, in the April and June 2010 elections, and in 2013. He was a member of the Scotty government from 2004 to 2007, a member of the Stephen government from 2007 to 2012, and a member of the Dabwido government for much of the first half of 2013.

From December 2007 to November 2011 he was Minister for Fisheries and Minister for Education. From June 2012 until February 2013, he held portfolios of Finance & Sustainable Development, as well as Education and Justice & Border Control.

Kun is also an expert on fisheries, one of Nauru's main industries.

=== Crossing the floor ===
Kun was one of the founding members of the reform group Naoero Amo (Nauru First).

He was appointed Minister of Finance in 2012 by then President Sprent Dabwido, but resigned and defected to the Opposition after a disagreement with President Dabwido over the latter's declaration of a state of emergency.

In 2013, Kun stood for the presidency against Baron Waqa but his party lost 13 to 5.

=== Suspension of Opposition members (ongoing current event) ===
In May 2014, Waqa suspended 5 of the 7 members of Nauru's Opposition from Parliament indefinitely, including Kun.

The suspension of Kun and 2 of his opposition colleagues (Hon Dr Kieren Keke and Hon Mathew Batsiua) was made on the grounds that they had expressed views in the international media that were critical of the government and the breakdown of the rule of law.

In June 2015, in a crackdown on Opposition MPs, the Waqa government arrested and cancelled the passports of certain opposition members claiming that they had been trying to destabilise the Government by talking to foreign media.

As part of the move against opposition members, on 17 June 2015, the Government cancelled Kun's passport and had him forcibly removed from a flight to New Zealand where he had been living with his wife and children since being suspended from Parliament in 2014.

Nauru's Supreme Court was due on 27 June 2015 to hear an application by Kun for judicial review to have his passport returned but the court deferred the application until 8 July 2015.

On 11 July 2016 Kun fled Nauru for New Zealand, having been granted New Zealand citizenship and a New Zealand passport.

Kun did not run for re-election in the 2016 parliamentary election.

== Personal life ==
Roland Kun is the son of Ruben Kun, a former President of Nauru and a member of Nauru's Parliament for 26 years.

Kun's cousin Russell Kun was also a former MP.

== See also ==
- Nauru 19
- Politics of Nauru
- Elections in Nauru
- 2008 Nauruan parliamentary election
- Political Families of the World (Nauru)
- Nauru government crackdown on opposition (2014-2015)
