= Richard-Hyde Menke =

Nauruan politician (born 1985)

The Honourable Richard-Hyde Menke MP

Member of the Nauruan Parliament for Meneng
- In office 2019–2025
- Preceded by: Vodrick Detsiogo
- Succeeded by: Lyn-Wannan Kam

Personal details
- Born: 9 January 1985 (age 41) Nauru

Richard-Hyde Menke, also known as Khyde Menke, (born 9 January 1985) is a Nauruan politician.

== Career ==
In the 2019 parliamentary election, Menke was elected to represent the Meneng Constituency. On 28 August, President Lionel Aingimea as deputy minister for Education and the Naoero Postal Services Corporation. Menke was re-elected in the 2022 election. On 27 September, President Russ Kun appointed Menke as minister for Education, Sports, the Naoero Postal Services Corporation, and Nauru Sports Development Incorporated.

Menke was unseated in the 2025 election.
