= Vodrick Detsiogo =

Nauruan politician

The Honourable Vodrick Detsiogo MP

Member of the Nauruan Parliament for Meneng
- In office 2016–2019
- Preceded by: Squire Jeremiah
- Succeeded by: Khyde Menke

Personal details
- Born: 10 June 1962 (age 63) Nauru

Vodrick Detsiogo (born 10 June 1962) is a Nauruan politician.

== Career ==
Vodrick Detsiogo was born on 10 June 1962. He is of the Eano tribe.

Before entering politics, Detsiogo worked as a pilot in Japan, Nauru, and New Zealand.

In the 2016 Nauruan parliamentary election, Detsiogo was elected to represent the Meneng Constituency. He was elected alongside Tawaki Kam and Lionel Aingimea. On 20 July, he was sworn in as assistant minister of education, transport, and the Nauru Air Corporation. In parliament, he served as a member of the Public Accounts Committee and the Constitutional Review Committee. He also served as Chair of Subsidiary Legislation and Deputy Chairman of Committees. In the 2019 election, Detsiogo lost re-election. Out of nine candidates, Detsiogo came in fifth. In the 2022 election, Detsiogo was again defeated, coming in fifth out of eleven candidates.

In March 2022, Detsiogo served as a pilot, alongside Kristian Keke and Dylan Rimmer, on the inaugural flight of VH-INU, a new Boeing 737-700 aircraft of Nauru Airlines, from Brisbane, Australia to Nauru.

== Personal life ==
On 22 July 1991, Detsiogo married Eleanor Harris of the Aiwo District at the Orro Congregational Church.
