= Aaron Cook (politician) =

Nauruan politician

The Honourable Aaron Cook MP
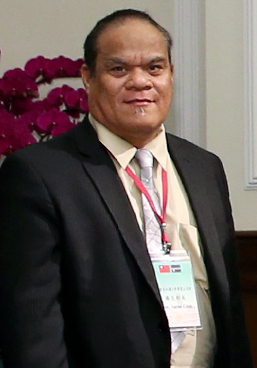
- Cook in 2016

Member of the Nauruan Parliament for Aiwo
- In office 2013–2019
- Preceded by: Godfrey Thoma
- Succeeded by: Rennier Gadabu

Aaron Stein Cook is a Nauruan politician.

== Biography ==
On 18 July 1981, Cook married Corina Shra Detudamo of the Uaboe District.

Cook unsuccessfully ran to represent the Aiwo Constituency in the parliament of Nauru in 2008, as well as April and June 2010. In 2009, Cook was elected as president of the Nauru Weightlifting Federation.

Cook was first elected to parliament in 2013 election, where he unseated Parliament Speaker Godfrey Thoma. Cook was appointed by President Baron Waqa as Minister for Commerce, Industry & Environment, RONPhos, and the Nauru Rehabilitation Corporation. In parliament, he served on both the Library Committee and the Printing Committee. Cook was re-elected in the 2016 election. Waqa again gave him ministerial appointments, as Minister for RONPhos, the Nauru Rehabilitation Corporation, and the Nauru Utilities Corporation. Cook failed to be re-elected in the 2019 election. Cook again unsuccessfully ran in the 2022 election and the 2025 election.

In August 2020, businessman Mozammil Gulamabbas Bhojani was convicted by an Australian court of bribing two Nauruan officials, Cook (in his capacity as minister for RONPhos) and RONPhos Chairman Trevor Bernicke, in exchange for favorable phosphate contracts between 2015 and 2017.
