= Bingham Agir =

Nauruan politician

The Honourable Bingham Agir MP
- Agir in 2023

Member of the Nauruan Parliament for Buada
- Incumbent
- Assumed office 2016
- Preceded by: Roland Kun

Jason Bingham Agir is a Nauruan politician.

== Career ==
On 12 January 2012, Agir was made a director on the Nauru Rehabilitation Corporation Board.

Agir unsuccessfully ran in the 2013 parliamentary election. In the 2016 parliamentary election Agir was elected to represent the Buada Constituency. On 20 July, President Baron Waqa appointed Agir as assistant minister for Telecommunications & Media, Sports, and the Eigigu Holdings Corporation. Agir was re-elected in the 2019 election. On 28 August, President Lionel Aingimea appointed Agir as assistant minister for Land Management and the Eigigu Holdings Corporation. Agir was again re-elected in the 2022 election. On 29 September, President Russ Kun appointed Agir as deputy minister for Land Management, the Eigigu Holding Corporation, and Nauru National Heritage & Museum. On 21 March 2023, President Kun changed Agir's appointments to be deputy minister for Land Management, the Cenpac Corporation, and the Eigigu Holdings Corporation.

On 30 October 2023, after a no-confidence vote against President Kun, there was a vote for president among the Parliament. Agir nominated Delvin Thoma. After the first secret ballot, MP David Adeang and Thoma were tied at nine votes. In the second vote, Thoma received only eight votes to Adeang's ten, resulting in the election of Adeang as president.
