= Batsiua =

Batsiua is a Nauruan surname. Notable individuals with it include:

- Mathew Batsiua (born 1971), Nauruan politician
- Tyoni Batsiua (1981–2004), Nauruan weightlifter
