= Wawani Dowiyogo =

Nauruan politician

The Honourable Wawani Dowiyogo MP

Member of the Nauruan Parliament for Ubenide
- In office 2019–2025

Personal details
- Born: 17 May 1989 (age 36) Nauru

Wawani Joe-Grant Dowiyogo (born 17 May 1989) is a Nauruan politician.

== Career ==
In January 2009, Dowiyogo was appointed as project officer in the Department of Tourism. He resigned on 13 October 2009.

In the 2019 Nauruan parliamentary election, Dowiyogo was elected to represent the Ubenide Constituency. He was elected alongside David Adeang, Russ Kun, and Reagan Aliklik. On 29 August, President Lionel Aingimea appointed Dowiyogo as Minister for Fisheries and the Nauru Utilities Corporation. He was re-elected in the 2022 election. He was re-appointed to his previous cabinet positions.

Dowiyogo was unseated in the 2025 election.

== Personal life ==
Dowiyogo is of the Iruwa tribe.
