= Minister Assisting the President of Nauru =

Position in the Cabinet of Nauru

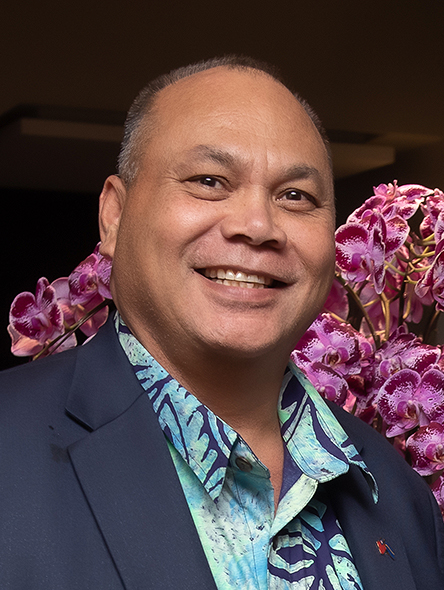
- Incumbent; Lionel Aingimea since 30 October 2023
- Seat: Cabinet of Nauru; Parliament of Nauru
- Nominator: Cabinet of Nauru
- Appointer: President
- Term length: Three years (ends when President leaves office)
- Inaugural holder: Buraro Detudamo
- Formation: Constitution of Nauru
- Salary: $89,315 (AUD) annually
- Website: naurugov.nr

The Minister Assisting the President of Nauru is a senior position in the Cabinet of Nauru, and responsible for acting as a substitute of the President of Nauru.

The President appoints the person holding this position among the members of the cabinet.

The Minister Assisting the President of Nauru succeeded to the Presidency once. President Bernard Dowiyogo died in March 2003, and was succeeded by Derog Gioura.

The current Minister Assisting the President of Nauru, Lionel Aingimea is also the first Vice President of Nauru. He is himself a former President of Nauru as well.

== List ==
Name	President	Took office	Left office
Buraro Detudamo	Hammer DeRoburt	January 1968	December 1976
Kinza Clodumar	Bernard Dowiyogo	December 1976	April 1978
Ruben Kun	Lagumot Harris	April 1978	May 1978
Buraro Detudamo	Hammer DeRoburt	May 1978	September 1986
Kinza Clodumar	Kennan Adeang	September 1986	October 1986
Buraro Detudamo	Hammer DeRoburt	October 1986	December 1986
Derog Gioura	Kennan Adeang	December 1986	December 1986
Buraro Detudamo	Hammer DeRoburt	December 1986	August 1989
Vinson Detenamo	Kenas Aroi	August 1989	December 1989
Vinson Detenamo	Bernard Dowiyogo	December 1989	November 1995
Ruben Kun	Lagumot Harris	November 1995	November 1996
Vinson Detenamo	Bernard Dowiyogo	November 1996	November 1996
Ruby Dediya	Kennan Adeang	November 1996	December 1996
Vinson Detenamo	Ruben Kun	December 1996	February 1997
Vinson Detenamo	Kinza Clodumar	February 1997	June 1998
Vinson Detenamo	Bernard Dowiyogo	June 1998	April 1999
Remy Namaduk	René Harris	April 1999	April 2000
Derog Gioura	Bernard Dowiyogo	April 2000	March 2001
Remy Namaduk	René Harris	March 2001	January 2003
Derog Gioura	Bernard Dowiyogo	January 2003	January 2003
Remy Namaduk	René Harris	January 2003	January 2003
Derog Gioura	Bernard Dowiyogo	January 2003	March 2003
Ludwig Scotty	Derog Gioura	March 2003	May 2003
David Adeang	Ludwig Scotty	May 2003	August 2003
Derog Gioura	René Harris	August 2003	June 2004
David Adeang	Ludwig Scotty	June 2004	December 2007
Kieren Keke	Marcus Stephen	December 2007	November 2011
Mathew Batsiua	Frederick Pitcher	November 2011	November 2011
Kieren Keke	Sprent Dabwido	November 2011	June 2013
David Adeang	Baron Waqa	June 2013	August 2019
Martin Hunt	Lionel Aingimea	August 2019	September 2022
Martin Hunt	Russ Kun	September 2022	October 2023
Lionel Aingimea	David Adeang	October 2023	Incumbent
