= Gabrissa Hartman =

Nauruan politician (born 1975)

The Honourable Gabrissa Hartman MP
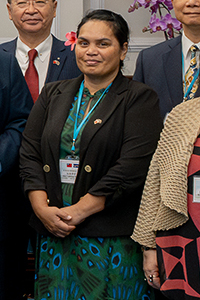
- Hartman in 2023

Member of the Nauruan Parliament for Ubenide
- In office 2017–2019
- Preceded by: Valdon Dowiyogo

Personal details
- Born: 7 June 1975 (age 51) Nauru
- Spouse: Carlson Bruno Hartman (m. 1998)
- Education: University of the South Pacific

Gabrissa Shirani Hartman (née Gioura; born 7 June 1975) is a Nauruan politician. She was a member of the Parliament of Nauru from 2017 to 2019, representing the Ubenide constituency. She is the third woman to be elected to the Parliament of Nauru.

Hartman received her school education in Australia, attending junior boarding school at St Vincent's College in Sydney and completing her last year of high school at Presbyterian Ladies' College in Armidale. She then studied law at the University of South Pacific, attending their Emalus campus in Vanuatu. Hartman then practised law and was a former deputy clerk of parliament under Speaker Ludwig Scotty before entering politics. She became engaged to Carlson Bruno Hartman on 17 November 1997, and the two married on 23 January 1998. She is a mother of five and the granddaughter of former interim President of Nauru Derog Gioura.

She unsuccessfully contested the 2016 election as an independent, running on a platform of "good governance, gender equality and improved housing". She received media attention during that campaign for using Facebook - which was banned in Nauru - to campaign as a way of getting her message out in the face of opposition difficulties in obtaining TV and radio advertising. She had earlier been one of 18 co-plaintiffs in a Supreme Court challenge to laws which had increased the nomination fee from US$143 to US$1436.

She was then elected to parliament at a by-election on 19 January 2017 following the death of Minister for Health, Sports and Fisheries Valdon Dowiyogo. Her first speech spoke of her hope for the country, commended her predecessor, and advocated improved law and order, improved housing, increasing the private sector, working on land rehabilitation, improving gender balance, and preparing for a "life beyond the processing centre".

She lost her seat in the 2019 Nauruan parliamentary election.
