= National Pingtung University of Science and Technology =

University in Taiwan

Coordinates: 22°38′27″N 120°35′44″E

- 國立屏東科技大學
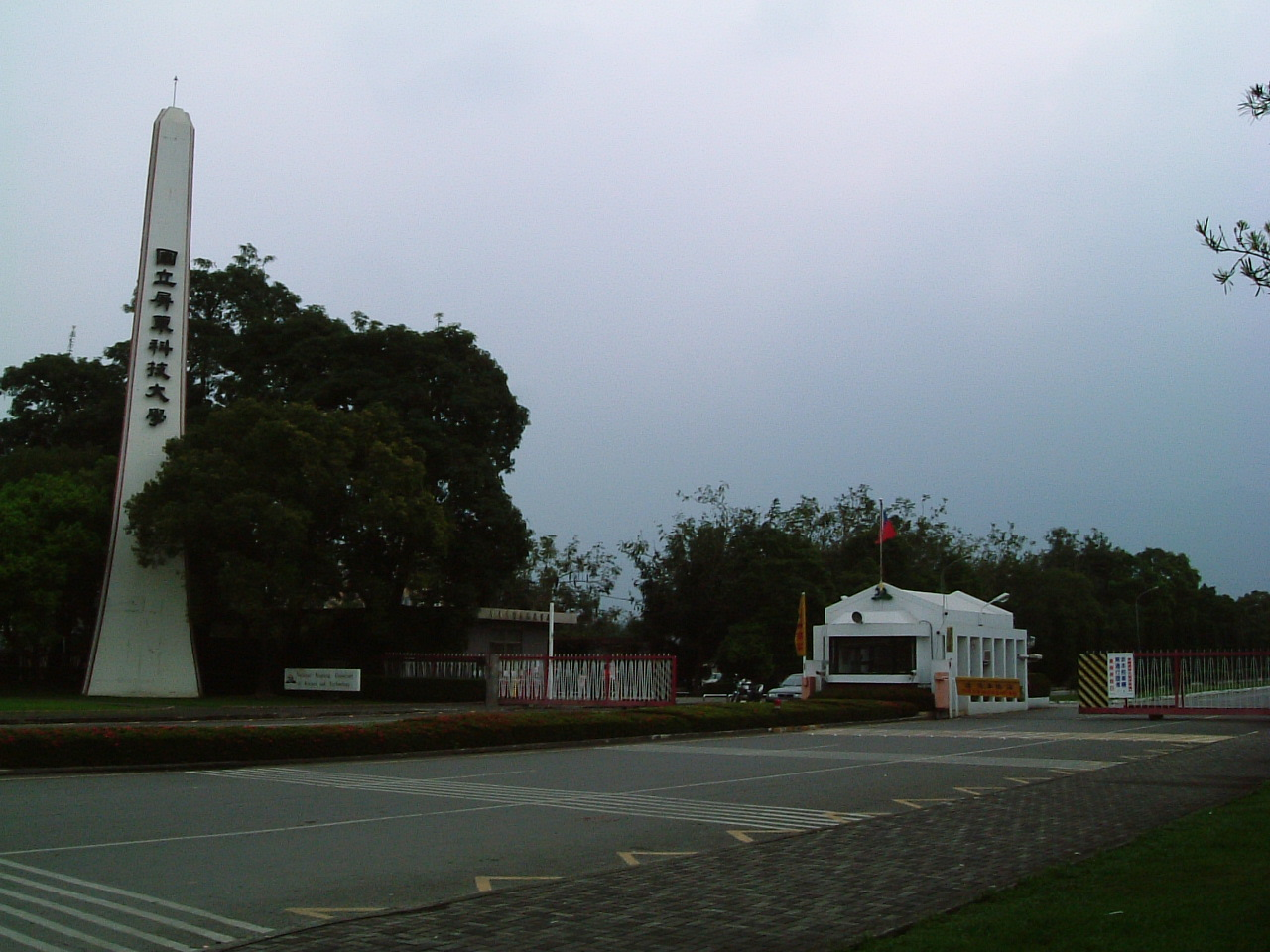
- Motto: 仁實(Pe̍h-ōe-jī: jîn-si̍t)
- Motto in English: Benevolent and True
- Type: Public
- Established: Founded 1924; 102 years ago
- President: Chang-Hsien Tai
- Location: Neipu, Pingtung County, Taiwan
- Campus: 704.25 acres (2.8500 km^{2})
- Website: Chinese English

National Pingtung University of Science and Technology
- Traditional Chinese: 國立屏東科技大學
Transcriptions
Standard Mandarin
- Hanyu Pinyin: Guólì Píngdōng Kējì Dàxué
Southern Min
- Hokkien POJ: Kok-li̍p Pîn-tong Kho-ki Tāi-ha̍k

National Pingtung University of Science and Technology (NPUST; Chinese: 國立屏東科技大學; Pe̍h-ōe-jī: Kok-li̍p Pîn-tong Kho-ki Tāi-ha̍k) is a public university in Neipu Township, Pingtung County, Taiwan. It was established in April 1924 as the Kaohsiung District Pingtung Extension School of Agriculture and over the years it has undergone several restructurings and name changes. The current name of National Pingtung University of Science and Technology was adopted in August 1997. In addition to the Neipu Campus, it has land in Kenting National Park and Taitung County.

== Academics ==
National Pingtung University of Science and Technology rankings

Regional – Overall
- QS Asia: 681-700 (2025)

NPUST has 26 departments, 35 master's programs, 8 doctoral programs, 1 international bachelor's degree program, and 2 international master's degree programs distributed among the colleges of Agriculture, Engineering, Management, Humanities and Social Sciences and Veterinary Medicine, and the International College. During the 2016 academic year, NPUST had 11,350 students, including 1,956 graduate students and 9,394 undergraduates.

National Pingtung University of Science and Technology offers one of the world's only graduate programs focussing on aquarium fish.

== Location ==
NPUST is in the Dawu Mountain foothills of northwestern Neipu Township in Pingtung County, near the Donggang River. The campus covers 298.3 hectares. NPUST is approximately 20 kilometers (12.5 miles) from the Pingtung Train Station and the trip takes around 30 minutes by car; the campus is also served by regular buses.

In addition to the Neipu Campus, NPUST has 285 hectares in the Baoli Forest of Kenting National Park and the 576-hectare Daren Ranch in Taitung County.

In 2020 National Pingtung University of Science and Technology was the most sustainable university in Taiwan according to the UI GreenMetric World University Rankings, the 4th most sustainable in Asia, and the 31st most sustainable in the world.

== Research ==
NPUST is cooperating with the United Nations Food and Agriculture Organization to establish an International Education College.

The International Institute for Infrastructural, Agriculture and Environmental Engineering (IAE) provides industry services and helps to strengthen academic industrial production. Currently it has established 14 centers for research and development.

NPUST is one of the best schools in the world for tropical agriculture research and is part of the University Network of Tropical Agriculture.

NPUST opened a research lab for artificial intelligence assisted agriculture in 2025.

=== Technology transfer ===
The technology transfer of offseason flowering forcing in longans has netted the university billions of NTD.

== President ==
Chin-Lung Chang became president of NPUST in August 2022.

== Notable alumni ==
- Tiong King Sing, Minister of Tourism, Arts and Culture of Malaysia
- Asterio Appi, Nauruan member of parliament
- Fu-Sung Chiang, dean of College of Humanities and Social Sciences, National Taiwan Ocean University
- Lung-Mu Chen, chairman, Known-You Seed Co. Ltd.
- Shi-Jye Jin, Actor
- Su Chung, general director, National Taiwan Symphony Orchestra

== See also ==
- List of universities in Taiwan
