= Martin Hunt (politician) =

Nauruan politician

Martin Porky Hunt
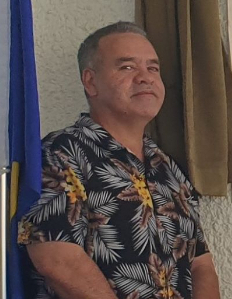

Minister Assisting the President
- In office 29 August 2019 – 30 October 2023
- President: Lionel Aingimea; Russ Kun
- Preceded by: David Adeang
- Succeeded by: Lionel Aingimea

Minister of Finance
- In office 29 August 2019 – 30 October 2023
- President: Lionel Aingimea; Russ Kun
- Preceded by: David Adeang
- Succeeded by: David Adeang

Personal details
- Education: University of the South Pacific

Martin Porky Hunt is a Nauruan politician. Hunt has been a member of Nauruan Parliament and Minister Assisting the President of Nauru and Minister of Finance of Nauru since 29 August 2019. He still holds these positions as of August 2022.

Hunt studied economics, history and politics at the University of the South Pacific between 1989 and 1991 and graduated with a bachelor of arts degree. In March 2008, Hunt was replaced by Clarissa Jeremiah as Nauruan Consul General based in Brisbane, Australia. Hunt then worked, as Chief Executive Officer of the state-owned Nauru Rehabilitation Corporation (2012 to 2014) and as Secretary for Finance at the Nauruan government (2013 to 2019).

Hunt ran for the first time as an MP in the 2019 Nauruan parliamentary election in the Boe constituency and came first out of five candidates, ahead of incumbent MPs Asterio Appi and Baron Waqa and former MP Mathew Batsiua. A few days later, Hunt was appointed Minister Assisting the President, Minister of Finance and Sustainability, Minister for Transport and Minister for Eigigu Holdings Corporation by the new President Lionel Aingimea.

In his capacity as Minister Assisting the President, Hunt has temporarily assumed the office of President of Nauru when Aingimea is abroad.

After President David Adeang was sworn in on 31 October 2023, Lionel Aingimea succeeded Hunt as Minister Assisting the President.

Hunt was unseated in the 2025 election.
