= Isabella Dageago =

Nauruan politician

The Honourable Isabella Dageago MP
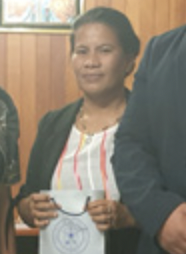

Member of the Nauruan Parliament for Yaren District
- Incumbent
- Assumed office 25 August 2019
- Preceded by: Kieren Keke

Minister of Health
- In office August 2019 – October 2022.
- President: Lionel Aingimea
- Preceded by: Charmaine Scotty
- Succeeded by: Charmaine Scotty

Deputy Speaker of Parliament
- Incumbent
- Assumed office 14 October 2025

Isabella Helen Dageago is a Nauruan nurse and politician who has served in the Parliament of Nauru for Yaren since 2022. She served as the Minister of Health from 2019 to 2022, during which she oversaw Nauru's response to the COVID-19 pandemic.

== Career ==
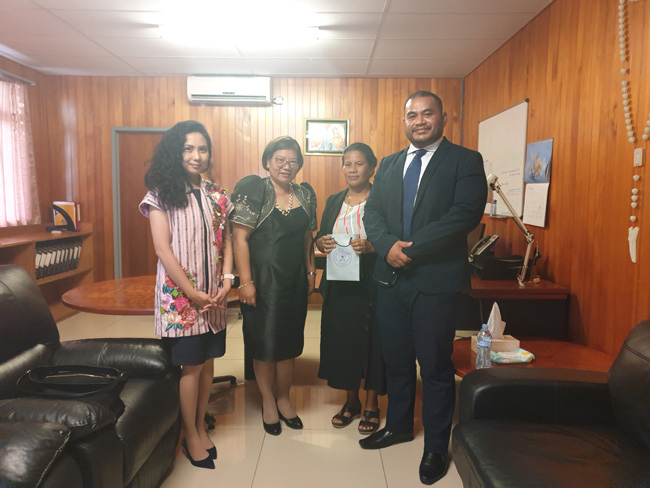
Dagaego (second from right) with the Philippine ambassador (second from left)

In the 2019 election, Dageago defeated former Minister of Foreign Affairs Kieren Keke to be one of two people that the Yaren District sent to the Parliament of Nauru; she was elected alongside incumbent Charmaine Scotty. Dageago ran as an independent. Dageago and Scotty were the only female MPs elected.

President Baron Waqa lost his seat in the 2019 election and was succeeded by Lionel Aingimea. Aingimea appointed Dageago as Minister of Health and Home Affairs in his cabinet. During Dageago's tenure as Minister of Health, she led Nauru's response to the COVID-19 pandemic, including declaring a national emergency in March 2020. She personally administrated the first COVID-19 vaccination in Nauru to Aingimea. By May, she announced that the entire adult population of Nauru - accounting for 63% of the total population - had been vaccinated against coronavirus, and estimated second doses would be completed by July 2021 following a donation of 10,000 vaccinations from the government of India. As of August 2021, no cases of coronavirus had been reported in Nauru.

After President David Adeang was sworn in on 31 October 2023, Dageago took an oath of office as Deputy Minister for Justice and Border Control for his cabinet.

In March 2024, Dageago was a member of a delegation to China and co-signed three memorandums of understanding on behalf of the government of Nauru.
