= Squire Jeremiah =

Nauruan politician

The Honourable Squire Jeremiah MP

Member of the Nauruan Parliament for Meneng
- In office 8 June 2013 – 2016
- Preceded by: Rykers Solomon
- Succeeded by: Vodrick Detsiogo
- Majority: 1.0% (30 votes)

Personal details
- Spouse: Christine Gideon
- Children: Christopher and Macarthur Jeremiah

Squire Jeremiah is a Nauruan politician.

As of 2012, he was the president of NGO Emendena Eimwi, "recently established" to raise public awareness of corruption and bribery issues in the country, and to lobby the government for more effective measures against these ills. With that aim, he entered politics, and was elected Member of Parliament for Meneng in the June 2013 general election. A fellow member of Emendena Eimwi, Doneke Kepae, also stood for Parliament, but was not elected. Jeremiah was defeated for re-election in the 2016 election. As there are no political parties in Nauru, Jeremiah sat as an independent.

== See also ==
- Nauru 19
