= Asterio Appi =

Nauruan politician

The Honourable Asterio Appi MP

Member of the Nauruan Parliament for Boe
- Incumbent
- Assumed office 2016
- Preceded by: Mathew Batsiua

Personal details
- Education: National Pingtung University of Science and Technology

Asterio Appi is a Nauruan politician.

== Early life and education ==
Asterio Appi studied abroad in Taiwan. He graduated from the National Pingtung University of Science and Technology from the Department of Tropical Agriculture and International Cooperation in 2011.

== Career ==
In March 2016, Appi resigned as director of quarantine at the Department of Justice and Border Control. In the 2016 parliamentary election, Appi was elected to represent the Boe Constituency. He was elected alongside Baron Waqa. After the election, he served as deputy speaker, under Speaker Cyril Buraman. On 9 August 2016, Appi was made a caucus member of the Nauru Phosphate Royalties Trust Working Group. In the 2019 election, Appi was re-elected alongside Martin Hunt. On 28 August 2019, President Lionel Aingimea appointed Appi to four deputy minister positions: Public Service, Foreign Affairs and Trade, Multicultural Affairs, and the Nauru Air Corporation. Appi was again re-elected in the 2022 election. On 29 September, Appi was re-appointed to his previous positions, with the exception of deputy minister for Public Service, and was additionally appointed to as deputy minister to the Eigigu Solutions Corporation and the Nauru Regional Processing Centre Corporation by President Russ Kun. On 22 March 2023, President Kun revoked his position as deputy minister for Multicultural Affairs.

After President David Adeang was sworn in on 31 October 2023, Appi was made Minister for Education, Climate Change and National Resilience, Naoero Postal Services, and Land Management.
