= Reagan Aliklik =

Nauruan politician

The Honourable Reagan Aliklik MP

Member of the Nauruan Parliament for Ubenide
- Incumbent
- Assumed office 2019

Reagan Winson Aliklik is a Nauruan politician.

== Career ==
Aliklik unsuccessfully ran for a parliament seat in the 2016 election. In the 2019 parliamentary election, he was elected to represent the Ubenide Constituency. He was elected alongside David Adeang, Wawani Dowiyogo, and Russ Kun. On 28 August, President Lionel Aingimea appointed Aliklik as Minister for the Republic of Nauru Phosphate Corporation (RONPHOS) and the Nauru Rehabilitation Corporation. As minister, the Nauruan government pledged to review both corporations Aliklik was minister of. In the 2022 parliamentary election, Aliklik was re-elected to parliament. On 29 September, President Russ Kun appointed Aliklik as Deputy Minister for Information and Communications Technology. On 21 March 2023, Aliklik was re-appointed to his previous position by President Kun, and additionally appointed as Deputy Minister for Foreign Investment and Industry Development.

After President David Adeang was sworn in on 31 October 2023, Aliklik was made Minister for Transport, Rehab, Nauru Utilities Corporation, and Fisheries.

== Personal life ==
On 11 October 2002, Reagan Winson Aliklik married Delfina Brechtefeld of the Anetan District.

Aliklik is a Seventh-day Adventist elder. He donated land for the creation of the first Seventh-day Adventist church in Nauru, which opened on 9 April 2017.
