= Ranin Akua =

Nauruan politician

The Honourable Ranin Akua

Member of the Nauruan Parliament for Ubenide
- Incumbent
- Assumed office 2025
- In office 8 June 2013 – 27 August 2019

Personal details
- Born: 17 August 1972 (age 53) Nauru

Ranin Randolph Akua (born 17 August 1972) is a Nauruan politician and a Member of Parliament from the constituency of Ubenide.

Akua was born on 17 August 1972. He is of the Deiboe tribe.

Akua ran for parliament unsuccessfully in April and June 2010.

He was elected in the 2013 parliamentary election. On 11 June 2013, he was elected deputy speaker unopposed. He was re-elected to parliament in 2016.

Having been unseated in the 2019 parliamentary election, Akua stood unsuccessfully to regain his Ubenide seat in 2022.

Akua was again elected to parliament in the 2025 election.
