= Flotilla of Hope =

2004 protest against Australian asylum policy

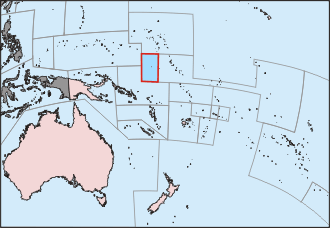
- The voyage departed from Australia to Nauru Island in the highlighted box
- Date: May–June 2004
- Location: Nauru
- Goals: Human rights
- Methods: Blockade running
- Result: Over half the refugees granted asylum, Aladdin Salanin released

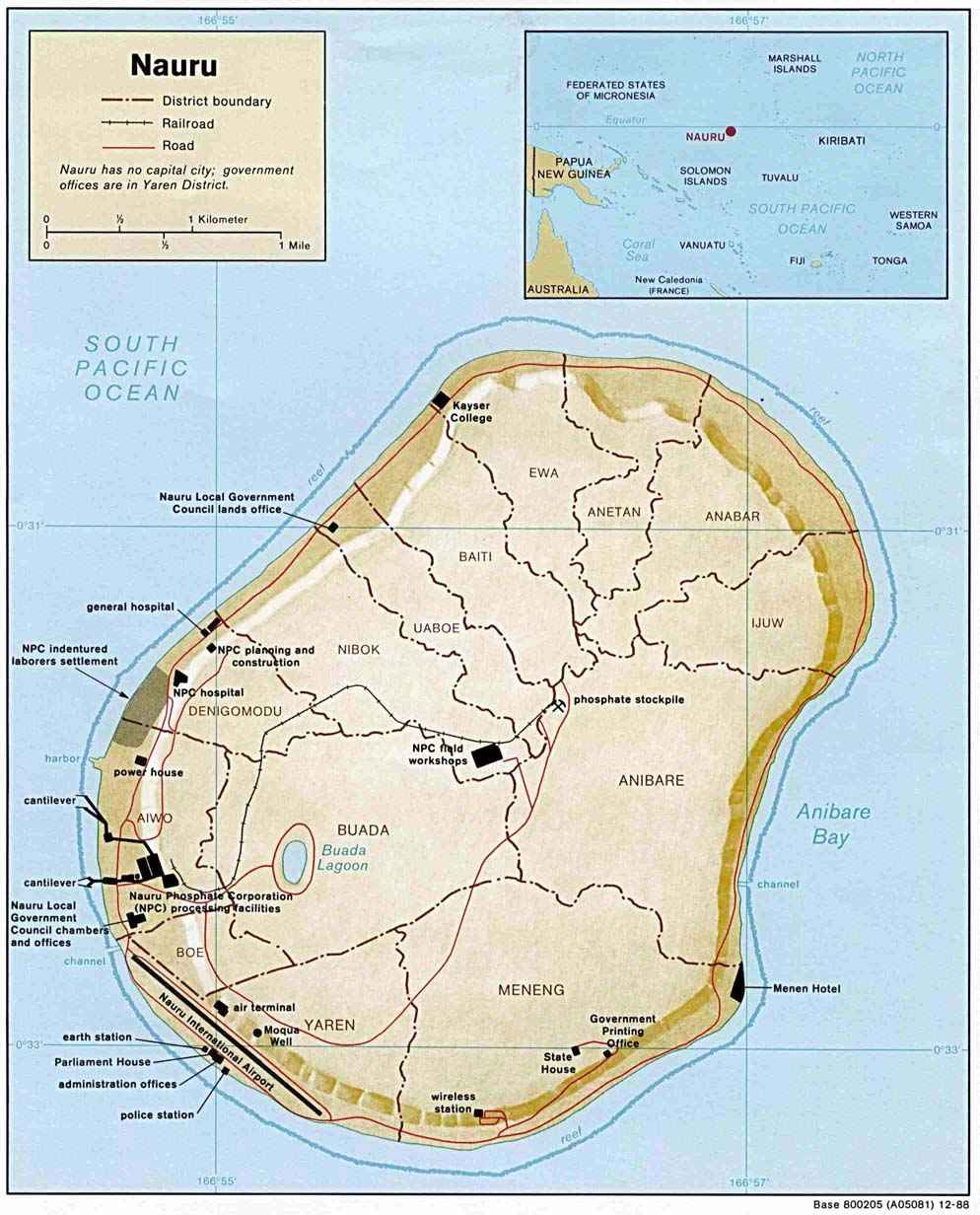
Nauru Island

The Flotilla of Hope was a voyage by yacht carried out in 2004 by protesters critical of the Australian government's asylum policy. Two boats, the Eureka and the One Off, sailed to Nauru, a Pacific island nation which is host to Australia's offshore immigrant detention centre. They intended to deliver goods to those interned (most detainees are families who fled conflict in Afghanistan and Iraq), but were not allowed to land by the Nauruan government. Under an agreement put into effect earlier that year, Australia had taken responsibility for the island's finances and civilian police force. Following the action, asylum was granted to over half the refugees on Nauru and Aladdin Salanin who was in solitary confinement on Manus Island, New Guinea was released.

Along the way to Nauru, the boats docked at Santa Cruz, a far flung island of the Solomon Islands where they were met by the local indigenous people. The boats carried their cargo through the 12 mile No Go Zone and got to within 500 metres of Nauru coast until they were chased out by 6 Nauruan boats.
