= Jesse Jeremiah =

Nauruan politician

The Honourable Jesse Jeremiah MP

Member of the Nauruan Parliament for Meneng
- Incumbent
- Assumed office 28 September 2022
- Preceded by: Tawaki Lyn-Wannan Kam

Personal details
- Born: 28 March 1988 (age 38)

Jesse Jeremiah (born 28 March 1988) is a Nauruan politician.

== Career ==
In the 2019 Nauruan parliamentary election, Jeremiah unsuccessfully ran for the Meneng Constituency. Out of nine candidates, Jeremiah came in fourth. In the 2022 parliamentary election, Jeremiah was successfully elected to the Parliament of Nauru, alongside Lionel Aingimea and Khyde Menke, who both won re-election. Jeremiah unseated Tawaki Lyn-Wannan Kam. On 29 September, Jeremiah was appointed to President Russ Kun's cabinet, as Deputy Minister of National Emergency Services. On 4 October, he was appointed Deputy Minister for Sports.

On 15 November 2022, Jeremiah was part of the Nauruan delegation during President Kun's first state visit to Taiwan.

In November 2022, Jeremiah competed in the Oceania Powerlifting Championships.

After President David Adeang was sworn in on 31 October 2023, Jeremiah was made Minister for Infrastructure, Commerce, Industry and Environment (CIE), National Emergency Services, and Sports and Sports Development Inc.
