= Delvin Thoma =

Nauruan politician

The Honourable Delvin Thoma MP
- Thoma in 2023

Member of the Nauruan Parliament for Aiwo
- Incumbent
- Assumed office 28 September 2022
- Preceded by: Milton Dube

Personal details
- Born: 8 February 1983 (age 43) Nauru

Delvin O'Neil Thoma (born 8 February 1983) is a Nauruan politician.

== Career ==
In the 2019 Nauruan parliamentary election, Thoma unsuccessfully ran for the Aiwo Constituency. Out of eight candidates, Thoma came in fourth. In the 2022 parliamentary election, Thoma was successfully elected to the Parliament of Nauru, alongside Rennier Gadabu, who won re-election. Thoma unseated Milton Dube. On 29 September, Thoma was appointed to President Russ Kun's cabinet, as Deputy Minister for the Republic of Nauru Phosphate Corporation (RONPHOS). On 21 March 2023, Thoma was again re-appointed as Deputy Minister of RONPHOS by President Kun, additionally being appointed Deputy Minister for Multicultural Affairs.

On 15 November 2022, Thoma was part of the Nauruan delegation during President Kun's first state visit to Taiwan.

On 30 October 2023, after a no-confidence vote against President Kun, there was a vote for president among the Parliament. Bingham Agir nominated Thoma. After the first secret ballot, MP David Adeang and Thoma were tied at nine votes. In the second vote, Thoma received only eight votes to Adeang's ten, resulting in the election of Adeang as president.

On 30 October, President Adeang replaced Thoma as RONPhos deputy minister with Isabella Dageago. On 31 October, President Adeang replaced Thoma as deputy minister for Multicultural Affairs with Maverick Eoe.
