= Milton Dube =

Nauruan politician

The Honourable Milton Dube MP

Member of the Nauruan Parliament for Aiwo
- In office 21 June 2010 – 28 September 2022
- Preceded by: Dantes Tsitsi
- Succeeded by: Delvin Thoma

Milton Ross Dube is a Nauruan politician.

He took part in the June 2010 parliamentary election, and came first in the Aiwo Constituency, unseating Opposition MP Dantes Tsitsi. It was Dube's first term in Parliament, and he was the sole new MP elected to Parliament, his 17 fellow MPs all being re-elected incumbents.

There are no political parties in Nauru, but nine MPs were aligned with president Marcus Stephen's incumbent government, while eight were members of the Opposition. Dube had stood as an independent, campaigning on issues of interest to the citizens of his constituency. In particular, he drew attention to the phosphate dust and other environmental issues resulting from the phosphate drying industry in Aiwo. Needing Dube's support to obtain an absolute majority in Parliament, the Stephen government promised to relocate the industry, and to examine the possibility of using new technologies to minimise the emission of phosphate dust during the drying process. Dube, however, remained independent, remaining unaligned and stating that he would offer his support to either side whenever they put forward policies benefiting his constituents.

Eventually, Dube stood for the presidency in a parliamentary secret ballot in November. He was defeated by the incumbent, Marcus Stephen, who was elected with eleven votes to Dube's six.

Dube was re-elected in the 2013 elections. He lost re-election in the 2022 elections to Delvin Thoma. He ran unsuccessfully in the 2025 election.
