= COVID-19 pandemic in Nauru =

- Disease: COVID-19
- Pathogen: SARS-CoV-2
- Location: Nauru
- First outbreak: Wuhan, China
- Index case: Denigomodu
- Arrival date: 2 April 2022
- Confirmed cases: 5,393
- Deaths: 1
- Fatality rate: 0.02%
- Vaccinations: 11,346 (fully vaccinated)

The COVID-19 pandemic in Nauru was part of the worldwide pandemic of coronavirus disease 2019 (COVID-19) caused by severe acute respiratory syndrome coronavirus 2 (SARS-CoV-2). The virus was confirmed to have reached Nauru on 2 April 2022.

== Background ==
On 12 January 2020, the World Health Organization (WHO) confirmed that a novel coronavirus was the cause of a respiratory illness in a cluster of people in Wuhan, Hubei Province, China, which was reported to the WHO on 31 December 2019.

The case fatality ratio for COVID-19 has been much lower than SARS of 2003, but the transmission has been significantly greater, with a significant total death toll.

== Timeline ==
Cases

Deaths

By March 2020, the government of Nauru declared a national emergency as a preventive measure, suspending all but one weekly flight to the country and instituting a 14-day quarantine for all arrivals. By June 2020, the government had formed a COVID-19 Taskforce. On 14 December, a historical case was identified on a shipping vessel. Since the case remained on board, it was not considered to have entered Nauru.

On 2 April 2022, Nauru recorded its first two cases of COVID-19. At the end of April 2022, two other cases were detected from incoming travelers and were contained in a quarantine facility. By 2 May, in reporting to the WHO, there were five confirmed COVID-19 cases; 22,976 vaccines doses administered, accounting for 79% of the population with two doses and 49% with the booster. On 21 June, Nauru reported its first community case. In addition, a total of 337 tested positive for COVID-19. Nauru recorded its first and only death from COVID-19 on 1 July, of Reanna Solomon, a weightlifter who was the first female Nauruan athlete to win a Commonwealth Games gold medal. The number of cases continued to rise for the remainder of the year.

By early March 2023, the total cases had reached 5,393 and no new cases were recorded after. By July 2023, the government disbanded the COVID-19 Taskforce, redirecting COVID-19 cases to the Republic of Nauru Hospital.

== See also ==
- COVID-19 pandemic in Oceania
