= Elections in Nauru =

Nauru elects on a national level a head of state (the president) and a legislature. Parliament has 19 members (increased from 18 for the 2013 election), elected for a three-year term in multi-seat constituencies. The president is elected for a three-year term by the parliament.

However, there are frequent changes of government in Nauru which occur without an election; most recently, in October 2023, when David Adeang was elected as the new President of Nauru following a no-confidence vote for Russ Kun.

== Voting system ==
The 19 seat members of the Parliament of Nauru are elected through the Dowdall System, a decimalised modification of a preferential Borda count. The voter must rank all candidates in order of preference (see preferential voting). Each vote is then counted using the formula 1/n, according to ranking order. For example, a candidate ranked first receives one point, the second candidate receives half a point, the third candidate receives a third of a point, and so on. Each legal vote is aggregated in order to determine a decimal score for each candidate. For example, in the June 2010 Nauruan parliamentary election the then president Marcus Stephen regained his Anetan Constituency seat after receiving 349.617 decimal votes from a total of 630 votes.

=== Referendums ===
A two-thirds majority is required for referendums to pass.

== Voter eligibility and election administration ==
The voting age in Nauru, as specified by the Article 29 of the constitution, is 20 years old. Voting is compulsory for citizens of Nauru. Early voting is held for the week before elections, for Nauruans who cannot make it to the polls on election day. A proxy can be appointed if a Nauruan citizen is out of the country on election day.

Elections in Nauru are administered by the Nauru Electoral Commission. Before its founding in 2016, elections were administered by the chief secretary, a political appointment by the president.

== See also ==
- Electoral calendar
- Electoral system
