= Dantes Tsitsi =

Naurauan politician

The Honourable Dantes Tsitsi MP

Member of the Nauruan Parliament for Aiwo
- In office August 26, 2007 – June 19, 2010
- Preceded by: Godfrey Thoma
- Succeeded by: Milton Dube

Personal details
- Born: 28 September 1959 (age 66) Nauru

Dantes Ingin Tsitsi (born 28 September 1959) is a Nauruan politician.

== Early life ==
Tsitsi was born on 28 September 1959, registered to the Aiwo District. He is a member of the Eamwit tribe.

== Political role ==
Tsitsi was elected to Parliament in the 2007 general elections, gaining the seat of Godfrey Thoma and representing the constituency of Aiwo. He was re-elected in the 2008 snap elections, and then in the April 2010 election, but lost his seat in the June 2010 election, where he was the only incumbent to be defeated.

=== Family background ===
Tsitsi is a close relative of former parliamentarian Edwin Tsitsi, a member of the first Parliament in 1968. Nauru's politics tend to be somewhat family oriented.

== See also ==
- Politics of Nauru
- Elections in Nauru
- 2008 Nauruan parliamentary election
