= Sprent Dabwido =

President of Nauru from 2011 to 2013

His Excellency Sprent Dabwido
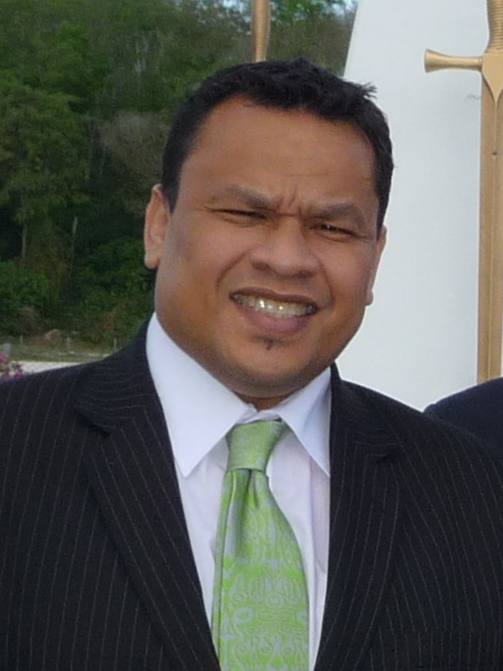
- Dabwido in 2012

President of Nauru
- In office 15 November 2011 – 11 June 2013
- Deputy: Kieren Keke
- Preceded by: Freddie Pitcher
- Succeeded by: Baron Waqa

Member of the Nauruan Parliament for Meneng
- In office 23 October 2004 – 13 July 2016
- Preceded by: Nimrod Botelanga

Personal details
- Born: Sprent Arumogo Dabwido; 16 September 1972 Nauru
- Died: 8 May 2019 (aged 46) Armidale, New South Wales, Australia
- Party: Nauru First (nominally Independent)
- Spouse: Luci Dabwido (m. 2019)

Sprent Arumogo Dabwido (16 September 1972 – 8 May 2019) was a Nauruan politician and weightlifter who served as President of Nauru from 2011 to 2013. The son of a parliamentarian, Dabwido was originally elected to the Meneng Constituency in the Parliament of Nauru at the 2004 elections. Having served as Minister for Telecommunications in Marcus Stephen's government from 2009, Dabwido joined the Nauruan opposition faction in November 2011 after Stephen's resignation, and, having passed a motion of no confidence against interim president Freddie Pitcher, was elected president four days later. In his role as president, Dabwido functioned as chairman of the Cabinet of Nauru, and held various portfolios in the Nauruan government.

== Weightlifting career ==
Prior to entering politics, Dabwido was a weightlifter. He was the national champion of Nauru in weightlifting in 1995 and 1996. He also represented Nauru internationally winning a silver medal for his country at the 1995 Samoa Games and competed at the 1995 World Weightlifting Championships in the super heavyweight category.

== Political career ==
The second son of former parliamentarian Audi Dabwido, Dabwido worked in public insurance before entering politics. He was a founding member of the Naoero Amo party, and was elected to the Parliament of Nauru at the 2004 elections, defeating Nimrod Botelanga to win the seat of Meneng. Re-elected at the 2007 and 2008 elections, he became a member of the parliamentary faction supporting President Marcus Stephen, and was made Minister for Telecommunications in Stephen's government in 2009 where he presided over the introduction of mobile phones to Nauru. Again re-elected at the 2010 elections, Dabwido joined the opposition faction in November 2011 when Stephen resigned as president to be succeeded by Freddie Pitcher.

=== President of Nauru ===
After a motion of no confidence against Pitcher, Dabwido was elected president by the parliament, with nine votes supporting his nomination and eight votes opposing.

Dabwido's first major international meeting as president was at the 2011 United Nations Climate Change Conference in Durban, South Africa, as a representative of the Pacific Islands grouping of Small Island Developing States (SIDS). In his speech during the opening plenary, he evaluated the potential problems faced by islands in the Pacific Ocean resulting from rising sea levels. Reiterating the SIDS objective for the reduction of greenhouse gas emissions in order to prevent further global climate change, Dabwido called for the development of a legally binding protocol alongside the Kyoto Protocol, with reference to "mitigation actions for developing countries" and the Bali Action Plan.

He supported the re-opening of the Australian-tax-payer-funded asylum seeker processing centre in Nauru, which is supported by the opposition Liberal Party of Australia but opposed by the governing Australian Labor Party. In June 2012, Dabwido sacked his cabinet after seven months in office, citing difficulty in passing the Constitutional Amendment Parliamentary Amendments Bill, a proposed constitutional reform bill that would alter the number of members of parliament, introduce an Ombudsman Commission, and introduce a code of ethics for parliamentarians. In his new Cabinet, he held the additional positions of Minister for Public Service, Minister for Police & Emergency Services, Minister for Home Affairs, and Minister for Climate Change. On behalf of Nauru, Dabwido made his first address to the United Nations General Assembly during the general debate of its sixty-seventh session, in September 2012. During his speech, he urged the UN to address climate change more directly, as well as criticising the ineffectiveness of multilateralism.

Dabwido did not stand for re-election, and was replaced by Baron Waqa after the 2013 parliamentary elections.

== Post-presidency ==
After his presidency, Dabwido returned to the parliament and became part of the opposition and alleged the Nauru government of corruption and abuse of power while the government has accused him and other opposition parliamentarians of spreading "lies about the country" as a response with speaking with journalists based outside Nauru. In 2015, Dabwido and others held anti-government protests in front of the parliament and they were charged with rioting. In the 2016 parliamentary election, Dabwido lost his seat after failing re-election. Those accused of rioting, including Dabwido, became involved in a court case known as "Nauru 19" and Dabwido were cleared of any wrongdoing in 2018 by the Supreme Court of Nauru.

In May 2018, Dabwido was diagnosed with terminal cancer at the Republic of Nauru Hospital. Dabwido left for Australia to undergo treatment for his condition and also seek political asylum, claiming that the Nauru government was preventing him from leaving Nauru for treatment overseas. The Nauru government has denied the claim, saying Dabwido was immediately accepted for fully funded overseas treatment for his condition.

In Australia, Dabwido rescinded his support for the Australian-funded asylum seeker processing center in Nauru and expressed his desire to have the facility cease operations; he also voiced support for the Medevac Bill.

== Personal life, health and death ==
Dabwido was in a domestic partnership with a woman named Luci. They had been in a relationship for at least eight years. The two became engaged when Dabwido proposed to Luci in the hospital where he was diagnosed with cancer. The two participated in a commitment ceremony in Sydney in 2019.

In 2018, Dabwido was diagnosed with throat cancer. He died from the disease on 8 May 2019, aged 46.

Political offices
Preceded by Freddie Pitcher	President of Nauru; 2011–2013	Succeeded by Baron Waqa
