= Nauru Electoral Commission =

Agency overview
- Formed: March 2016
- Jurisdiction: Nauruan government
- Headquarters: Civic Centre, Aiwo District
- Agency executive: David Detudamo
- Website: election.com.nr

The Nauru Electoral Commission (NEC) is the body which oversees elections in Nauru.

== History ==
Before the NEC, Nauruan elections were administered by the chief secretary, who was a political appointment by the president. The NEC was established in March 2016, after parliament passed the Electoral Act. Shortly after its establishment, the NEC was provided with technical assistance from the Commonwealth of Nations ahead of the 2016 parliamentary election. Joseph Cain was first appointed Electoral Commissioner. He served from 2016 to 2020. His successor, former deputy electoral commissioner Sylvana Deireragea was appointed in 2020. David Detudamo was appointed as commissioner on 12 February 2025.

== Membership and responsibilities ==
The NEC consists of three members: an electoral commissioner, and two deputy electoral commissioners. Members of the NEC are appointed for four year terms by the president, with advice from parliament. Responsibility for the NEC falls under the ministerial portfolio of the president. The organisation is headquartered at Civic Centre in the Aiwo District.

According to Freedom House, the NEC "is responsible for managing the entire election process." The NEC is responsible for developing policies and regulations to facilitate elections in Nauru. They also play a role in educating the public on how to participate in elections. This comes in the form of instructional sessions before elections. The NEC provides information to the Nauruan people, such as electoral rolls, by displaying it for public viewing outside of their headquarters. The NEC also provides updates online through their Facebook page and official website.

== See also ==
- Elections in Nauru
