= Rykers Solomon =

Nauruan politician

The Honourable Rykers Solomon MP

Member of the Nauruan Parliament for Meneng
- In office August 26, 2007 – June 8, 2013
- Preceded by: Dogabe Jeremiah
- Succeeded by: Lyn-Wannan Kam

Personal details
- Born: 4 October 1965 (age 60) Nauru

Rykers Solomon (born October 4, 1965) is a Nauruan politician.

== Parliamentary role ==
Solomon was elected to parliament in the 2007 general elections, gaining the seat of Dogabe Jeremiah. He has been re-elected in the 2008 polls. He was defeated for re-election in 2013.

=== Parliamentary constituency ===
He represented Meneng in the Parliament of Nauru.

== Background ==
Solomon is a close relative of weightlifter and Olympian participant Reanna Solomon.

== See also ==
- Politics of Nauru
- Elections in Nauru
- 2008 Nauruan parliamentary election
