= Meneng constituency =

Meneng
- Constituency
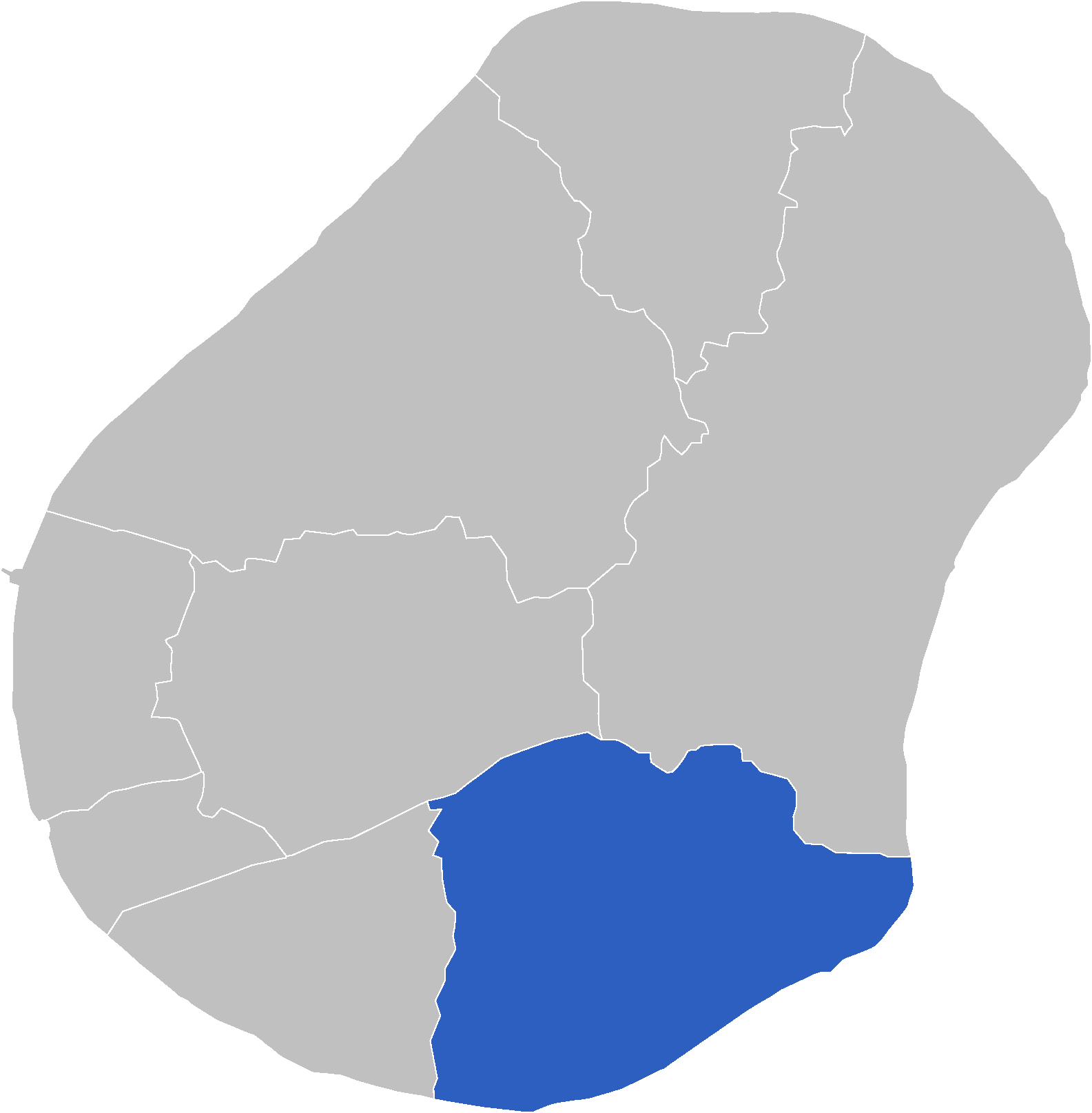
- Meneng Constituency within Nauru
- Coordinates: 0°33′0″S 166°57′01″E
- Country: Nauru
- Districts: 1 (Meneng)

Area
  - Total: 3.1 km^{2} (1.2 sq mi)

Population (2011)
  - Total: 1,380
- Time zone: (UTC+12)
- Area code: +674
- Members of Parliament: 3

Meneng is one of the constituencies of Nauru. It returns three members to the Parliament of Nauru in Yaren. Previously, the Meneng Constituency returned two members of parliament, but in June 2013, the Electoral Act was amended to add an additional parliament member to the constituency. It comprises the Meneng District. It is the southernmost constituency in Nauru.

== Members of Parliament ==
Seat 1
Member	Term	Party
Nimrod Botelanga	?-2004	Non-partisan
Sprent Dabwido	2004–2016	Nauru First
Lionel Aingimea	2016–present	Non-partisan
Seat 2
Member	Term	Party
Dogabe Jeremiah	?-2007	Non-partisan
Rykers Solomon	2007-2013	Non-partisan
Lyn-Wannan Tawaki Kam	2013–2022	Non-partisan
Jesse Jeremiah	2022–present	
Seat 3
Member	Term	Party
Squire Jeremiah	2013–2016	Non-partisan
Vodrick Detsiogo	2016–2019	
Khyde Menke	2019–present	

== Election results ==
Candidate	Preference votes									Total	Notes
Candidate	1	2	3	4	5	6	7	8	9	Total	Notes
Lionel Aingimea	506	371	152	83	85	98	119	100	124	839.528	Re-elected
Jesse Jeremiah	358	328	304	132	82	103	111	122	98	731.896	Re-elected
Tawaki Kam	236	191	237	168	125	130	131	190	230	567.187	Elected
Khyde Menke	211	176	125	130	120	98	156	227	395	508.050	Unseated
Wiram Wiram	154	140	171	187	240	251	228	170	97	482.183	
Siro Taldon	66	171	200	228	274	237	190	155	117	428.985	
Brocky Trebla Olsson	60	117	128	180	183	232	265	270	203	375.596	
Jim Kalinsky Brechtefeld	46	74	162	236	262	292	272	194	100	371.285	
Nickos Simon	1	70	159	294	267	197	166	210	274	329.142	
Valid votes	1,638										
Invalid votes	34										
Total votes	1,672										
Source: Electoral Commission of Nauru
