= Lyn-Wannan Kam =

Nauruan politician

The Honourable Lyn-Wannan Tawaki Kam MP
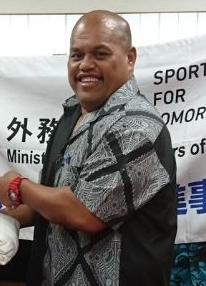
- Kam in 2018

Member of the Nauruan Parliament for Meneng
- Incumbent
- Assumed office 2025
- In office 8 June 2013 – 28 September 2022
- Preceded by: Rykers Solomon
- Succeeded by: Jesse Jeremiah
- Majority: 2.7% (83 votes)

Lyn-Wannan Tawaki Kam is a Nauruan politician, and former sports figure.

== Parliamentary role ==
He stood unsuccessfully for the 2010 general elections, then was elected Member of Parliament for Meneng in the June 2013 general elections. He was unseated in the 2022 election by Jesse Jeremiah. As there are no political parties in Nauru, Kam sat as an independent.

Kam was elected again in 2025.

== Role in sport ==
He is also an amateur athlete, and won a gold medal in powerlifting (men's 125 kg+ category) in the inaugural Nauru Games in 2009.
