= Charmaine Scotty =

Nauruan politician

The Honourable Charmaine Eraidinomo Scotty MP
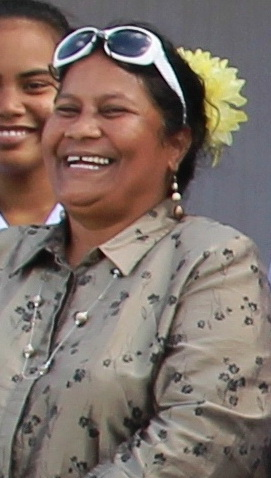

Member of the Nauruan Parliament for Yaren
- Incumbent
- Assumed office 8 June 2013
- Preceded by: Dominic Tabuna
- Majority: 10.1% (116 votes)

Charmaine Eraidinomo Scotty is a Nauruan politician who has been a Member of Parliament for Yaren since 2013. She was a cabinet minister from 2013 to 2019.

== Biography ==
=== Overview ===
She exercised a career in the highest levels of public service, culminating as Permanent Secretary successively in the ministries of Health, Home Affairs and Justice. She stood unsuccessfully as a candidate to Parliament in the 2010 general elections, then was elected Member of Parliament for Yaren (the de facto capital) in the June 2013 general election. The Yaren constituency elects two MPs; Scotty came first, ahead of medical doctor, former Cabinet minister and veteran politician Kieren Keke, who retained the second seat. The other incumbent, Dominic Tabuna, was thus defeated. As there are no political parties in Nauru, Scotty sits as an independent. Her election made history: she is only the second woman in Nauruan history to be elected to Parliament, following Ruby Dediya (who was MP from 1986 to 1992 and from 1995 to 1997).

=== Cabinet Minister ===
Following her election to Parliament, Mrs. Scotty was appointed by newly elected President Baron Waqa to serve in his administration as Minister for Home Affairs, Education, Youth, and Land Management.

After President David Adeang was sworn in on 31 October 2023, Scotty was made Minister Health, Internal Affairs, Women's and Social Development Affairs, People living with Disability, and the Naoero Museum and Tourism.

=== Relations ===
Charmaine Scotty's husband is the cousin of Ludwig Scotty, former President of Nauru and fellow MP in the 2013 Parliament.

== See also ==
- Ruby Thoma#Historic significance of role
