= Mathew Batsiua =

Nauruan politician

The Honourable Mathew Batsiua

Member of the Nauruan Parliament for Boe
- In office October 23, 2004 – July 9, 2016
- Preceded by: Kinza Clodumar
- Succeeded by: Asterio Appi

Personal details
- Born: 27 May 1971 (age 54) Nauru
- Profession: public servant

Mathew Jansen Batsiua (born 27 May 1971) is a Nauruan politician. Batsiua, a former health minister and former foreign minister of Nauru, has served as a member of parliament for the constituency of Boe since 2004.

== Parliamentary role ==
Batsiua has been elected to parliament in the 2004 general elections, ousting long-time parliamentarian and former president Kinza Clodumar. He has been re-elected in the 2007 and 2008 elections.

He was Minister of Finance in the cabinet of Marcus Stephen from July 2011 to November 2011. He was appointed as Minister Assisting the President of Nauru in the short-lived cabinet of Frederick Pitcher in November 2011.

=== Parliamentary constituency ===
He represented the Boe Constituency in the Parliament of Nauru. He was defeated in the 2016 parliamentary election.

== Protest and trial ==
In 2014, Batsiua along with other opposition MPs were suspended from their parliament seats. In June 2015, there was an anti-government protest against this. Batsiua was arrested, and 18 other people in total were charged, dubbed the Nauru 19. On 13 September 2018, they were granted a permanent stay on their case. The government appealed, and the stay was lifted. In December 2019, Batsiua was sentenced to 11 months in prison. He was released in April 2020.

== See also ==
- Politics of Nauru
- Elections in Nauru
- 2008 Nauruan parliamentary election
