= Baron Waqa =

President of Nauru from 2013 to 2019

His Excellency Baron Waqa
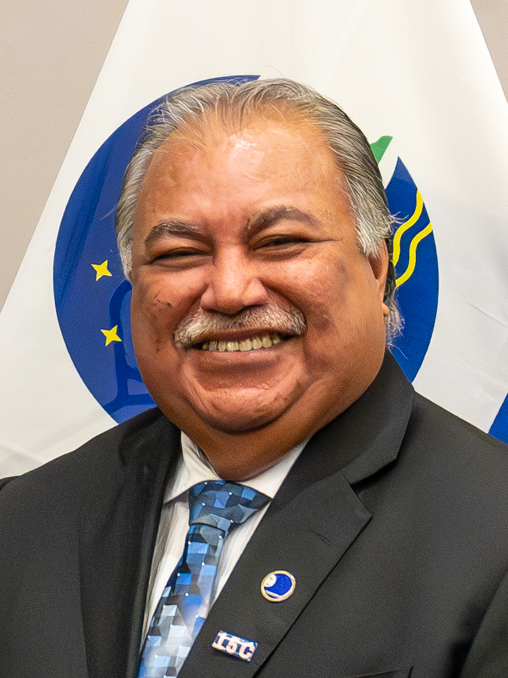
- Baron Waqa in 2024

Secretary General of the Pacific Islands Forum
- Incumbent
- Assumed office 3 June 2024
- Preceded by: Henry Puna

President of Nauru
- In office 11 June 2013 – 27 August 2019
- Deputy: David Adeang
- Preceded by: Sprent Dabwido
- Succeeded by: Lionel Aingimea

Minister of Education
- In office 22 June 2004 – 17 December 2007
- President: Ludwig Scotty
- Preceded by: Marcus Stephen
- Succeeded by: Roland Kun
- In office 29 May 2003 – 8 August 2003
- President: Ludwig Scotty
- Preceded by: Remy Namaduk
- Succeeded by: Marcus Stephen

Member of the Nauruan Parliament for Boe
- In office 3 May 2003 – 27 August 2019
- Preceded by: Ross Cain
- Succeeded by: Martin Hunt

Personal details
- Born: Baron Divavesi Waqa; 31 December 1959 (age 66) Boe, Nauru
- Party: Independent
- Spouse: Louisa Waqa
- Waqa's voice Waqa speaking at the Connect Asia-Pacific 2013 Summit; Recorded November 20, 2013

Baron Divavesi Waqa (/bæˈrɒn dɪvəveɪˈsiː wɑːˈkɑː/; born 31 December 1959) is a Nauruan politician who currently serves as the secretary-general of the Pacific Islands Forum. He was the President of Nauru from 11 June 2013 until 27 August 2019. He previously served as Minister of Education from 2004 to 2007.

== Background ==
Waqa was born on 31 December 1959. He is a member of the Eamwidamwit tribe. Waqa has a master's degree from Monash University, Clayton, Australia, and a bachelor's degree from the University of the South Pacific in Suva, Fiji.

== Political role ==
Waqa was elected in the May 2003 elections to the Parliament of Nauru, representing the constituency of Boe. Under President Ludwig Scotty, he served as Minister of the Interior and of Education; however, he had to leave the post upon Scotty's replacement by René Harris. He kept his seat in Parliament.

On 23 April 2004, Waqa and his colleagues Kieren Keke, David Adeang and Fabian Ribauw participated in protests at the Nauru International Airport in Yaren; these were meant to show displeasure regarding government policy against Afghan asylum-seekers in Australia and the Flotilla of Hope, as well as against the deadlock then encountered in Parliament. All four faced up to fourteen years in jail because of their participation in the protest; charges were dropped, however, upon Scotty's re-ascension the following June. Scotty once again appointed Waqa to be Minister of Education.

Waqa remained loyal to his administration during the ministerial crisis which occurred in 2007. Consequently, Waqa was not invited to serve in the subsequent administration of President Marcus Stephen which later took office.

Waqa was elected president in June 2013, defeating former Finance Minister and opposition nominee Roland Kun by a vote of 13 to 5. He was chosen by the government faction after President Dabwido stepped aside to allow for Waqa's election so that government members could remain in power.

In January 2014, he survived a vote of confidence over his deportation of the Australian resident magistrate Peter Law and the cancelling of the visa of the Chief Justice Geoffrey Eames, also an Australian national. The government also sought to draft an emergency rule law with the help of Fijian lawyers. It followed the dismissal of the parliamentary counsel Katy Le Roy and the subsequent resignation of the Solicitor-General Steven Bliim, both of whom were Australian. Home Minister Charmaine Scotty said this was symptomatic of a "system of cronyism" operated by Australian expatriates who he said were in league with the opposition.

In the 2019 election, he lost his parliamentary seat and bid to be re-elected to the office.

In 2023, Waqa was appointed to lead the Pacific Islands Forum starting in 2024. His term began on 3 June 2024.

== Honours and awards ==
- Taiwan:
  - Grand Cordon of the Order of Brilliant Jade (March 2019)

== Personal life ==
He is married to Louisa Waqa.

== See also ==
- Politics of Nauru
- List of foreign ministers in 2017
- List of current foreign ministers

Political offices
Preceded by Sprent Dabwido	President of Nauru; 2013–2019	Succeeded by Lionel Aingimea
Diplomatic posts
Preceded by Henry Puna	Secretary General of the Pacific Islands Forum; 2024–present	Incumbent
