= Lionel Aingimea =

President of Nauru from 2019 to 2022

His Excellency Lionel Aingimea MP
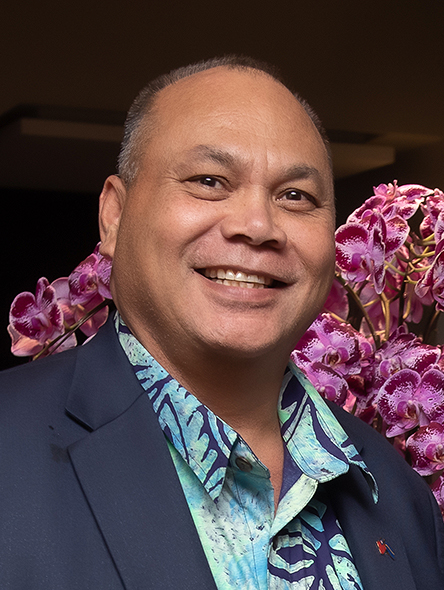
- Aingimea in 2019

President of Nauru
- In office 27 August 2019 – 28 September 2022
- Deputy: Martin Hunt
- Preceded by: Baron Waqa
- Succeeded by: Russ Kun

Vice President of Naoero
- Incumbent
- Assumed office 16 April 2026
- President: David Adeang
- Preceded by: Office established

Minister for Justice, Foreign Affairs, the Nauru Police Force, Nauru Port, Nauru Shipping Line
- Incumbent
- Assumed office 30 October 2023
- President: David Adeang

Minister Assisting the President
- Incumbent
- Assumed office 30 October 2023
- President: David Adeang
- Preceded by: Martin Hunt

Deputy Speaker of Parliament
- In office 28 September 2022 – 14 October 2025

Assistant Minister for Justice and Border Control
- In office 2016–2019

Member of Parliament for Meneng
- Incumbent
- Assumed office 2016

Personal details
- Born: 2 September 1965 (age 61)
- Party: Independent
- Spouse: Ingrid Engar (m. 1985)

Lionel Rouwen Aingimea (born 2 September 1965) is a Nauruan lawyer and politician who is serving as the first Vice President of Nauru since 16 April 2026 as well as the current Minister Assisting the President of Nauru. He served as President of Nauru from 2019 to 2022. He formally served as Deputy Speaker of the Parliament of Nauru.

== Early life ==
Aingimea was born in September 1965 into the Deiboe tribe. He studied law in Australia and subsequently worked for the Regional Rights Resource Team NGO, and as a public defender in the Marshall Islands. He later worked as a lecturer in law at the University of the South Pacific. On 20 December 1985, Aingemea married Ingrid Engar.

== Political career ==
Aingimea ran for election to Parliament in the Meneng constituency in 2013, but failed to be elected. Following the elections, he joined the new administration of President Baron Waqa as Secretary for Justice.

After successfully contesting the Meneng seat in the 2016 elections, he was appointed Assistant Minister for Justice and Border Control in Waqa's government, serving under Minister for Justice David Adeang. He was re-elected in the 2019 elections, which saw Waqa lose his seat. Following the elections, he was elected President by Parliament, defeating Adeang by twelve votes to six.

After Russ Kun's election as president, on 28 September 2022, Aingimea began serving as Deputy Speaker under Speaker Marcus Stephen.he was replaced in October 2025 by Isabella Dageago after the 2025 election.

After President David Adeang was sworn in on 30 October 2023, Aingimea was made Minister for Justice, Foreign Affairs, the Nauru Police Force, Nauru Port, Nauru Shipping Line and Minister Assisting the President.

Following a constitutional reform, Aingimea was appointed as the inaugural Vice President of Nauru by President David Adeang.
