= 2007 Nauruan parliamentary election =

Parliamentary elections were held in Nauru on 25 August 2007. There were more than 80 candidates for the 18 seats available. Fifteen MPs were reelected, among them fourteen supporters of Ludwig Scotty's government; the only opposition politician to be reelected was René Harris. Of the three seats which changed hands, two were losses for the opposition and one was a gain. Following the elections, there were fifteen pro-government members and three opposition members.

== Results ==
Party	Seats
Supporters of Ludwig Scotty	15
Other independents	3
Total	18
Source: Xinhua

=== By constituency ===
Constituency	Candidate	Votes	Notes
Aiwo	Dantes Tsitsi	213.550	Elected
Aiwo	René Harris	199.411	Elected
Aiwo	Godfrey Thoma	187.092	
Aiwo	Clarissa Eimaoa Jeremiah	151.248	
Aiwo	Elkoga Gadabu	144.927	
Aiwo	Amos Randall Cook	143.764	
Aiwo	Preston Thoma	126.582	
Aiwo	Peta Eiredeben Gadabu	116.221	
Aiwo	Invalid/blank votes	13	
Aiwo	Total Votes Cast	485	
Anabar	Ludwig Scotty	278.810	Elected
Anabar	Riddel Akua	248.948	Elected
Anabar	James Deireragea	189.352	
Anabar	Tyrone Deiye	179.350	
Anabar	David Peter Gadaraoa	152.276	
Anabar	Corey Milton Menke	135.781	
Anabar	Espen Fritz	124.876	
Anabar	Invalid/blank votes	11	
Anabar	Total Votes Cast	516	
Anetan	Cyril Buraman	240.052	Elected
Anetan	Marcus Stephen	218.390	Elected
Anetan	Remy Namaduk	201.576	
Anetan	Landon Deireragea	158.695	
Anetan	Cheyenne Timothy Ika	153.452	
Anetan	Darryl Tom	134.810	
Anetan	Fabian Rue-Chen Ika	132.410	
Anetan	Invalid/blank votes	7	
Anetan	Total Votes Cast	485	
Boe	Baron Waqa	261.845	Elected
Boe	Mathew Batsiua	253.127	Elected
Boe	Kinza Clodumar	202.270	
Boe	Vollmer Mercury Appi	129.336	
Boe	Lidira Lantok Ephraim	123.223	
Boe	Dale Richard Cecil	112.556	
Boe	Samuel Robinen Billiam	108.270	
Boe	August Detonga Deiye	103.073	
Boe	Invalid/blank votes	6	
Boe	Total Votes Cast	482	
Buada	Shadlog Bernicke	184.783	Elected
Buada	Roland Kun	176.367	Elected
Buada	Vinson Detenamo	164.983	
Buada	Terangi Adam	149.883	
Buada	John Palik Agir	116.067	
Buada	Manfred Rabaima Depaune	114.417	
Buada	Invalid/blank votes	7	
Buada	Total Votes Cast	377	
Meneng	Sprent Dabwido	318.490	Elected
Meneng	Rykers Solomon	248.043	Elected
Meneng	Dogabe Abner Jeremiah	247.371	
Meneng	Nemo Levi Agadio	233.405	
Meneng	Doneke Kepae	221.469	
Meneng	Darius Billiam	206.777	
Meneng	Simpson Simon	191.281	
Meneng	Nimrod Botelanga	180.590	
Meneng	Joseph Hiram	156.959	
Meneng	Ivan Motiti	156.588	
Meneng	Aggi Ranmago Mau Edward	152.253	
Meneng	Invalid/blank votes	16	
Meneng	Total Votes Cast	782	
Ubenide	David Adeang	404.468	Elected
Ubenide	Freddie Pitcher	397.188	Elected
Ubenide	Valdon Dowiyogo	380.057	Elected
Ubenide	Fabian Ribauw	230.166	Elected
Ubenide	Aloysius Amwano	214.370	
Ubenide	Ruston Kun	203.198	
Ubenide	Darren Tsiode	187.265	
Ubenide	Alf Diranga Itsimaera	184.033	
Ubenide	Renos Renige Agege	162.511	
Ubenide	Ellington Dowabobo	155.826	
Ubenide	Michael Fury Roland	151.090	
Ubenide	Celestine Eoaeo	144.070	
Ubenide	Dempsey Keppa	136.031	
Ubenide	Derog Gioura	135.363	
Ubenide	Grillo Michael Dekarube	134.706	
Ubenide	Andre Gorodu Notte	134.593	
Ubenide	Anthony Roteb Garabwan	131.884	
Ubenide	Ceila Cecilia Giouba	130.319	
Ubenide	Kemp Detenamo	129.474	
Ubenide	Cindy Pulvera	118.985	
Ubenide	Wolverstone Tatum	117.049	
Ubenide	Walton Doguape	103.084	
Ubenide	Invalid/blank votes	59	
Ubenide	Total Votes Cast	1,166	
Yaren	Dominic Tabuna	193.886	Elected
Yaren	Kieren Keke	165.949	Elected
Yaren	Charmaine Scotty	140.512	
Yaren	Pres Nimes Ekwona	112.234	
Yaren	Douglas Dogura Audoa	105.030	
Yaren	Moses Alexius Neneiya	74.691	
Yaren	Presley Debao	72.044	
Yaren	Brian Amwano	70.504	
Yaren	Terence Debao	66.055	
Yaren	John Daigon Akubor	65.242	
Yaren	Invalid/blank votes	9	
Yaren	Total Votes Cast	373	
Source: Republic of Nauru Government Gazette, 26 August, 2007

== Presidential election ==
On 28 August the newly elected MPs elected the president, who was required by the constitution be a member of parliament. Incumbent president Ludwig Scotty was elected with 14 votes to three for Commonwealth Games gold-winning weightlifter Marcus Stephen. However, after a vote of no confidence in December 2007, Scotty's government was ousted in favour of a new administration led by Stephen who became president.
