= 2000 Nauruan parliamentary election =

Early parliamentary elections were held in Nauru on 8 April 2000. All candidates ran as independents. Following the election René Harris was elected President by the Parliament, defeating Bernard Dowiyogo by one vote. However, following the resignation of Speaker Ludwig Scotty and Deputy Speaker Ross Cain, Cain resigned, and Dowiyogo was subsequently elected president. Voter turnout was 89%.

== Results ==
Party	Votes	%	Seats
Independents	3,292	100.00	18
Total	3,292	100.00	18
Valid votes	3,292	96.54	
Invalid/blank votes	118	3.46	
Total votes	3,410	100.00	
Registered voters/turnout	3,829	89.06	
Source: Gazette, Nohlen et al.

=== By constituency ===
Constituency	Candidate	Votes	Notes
Aiwo	René Harris	191.783	Elected
Aiwo	Godfrey Thoma	188.277	Elected
Aiwo	Randall Amos Cook	103.799	
Aiwo	David Libokimedo Agir	94.918	
Aiwo	Therodore Conrad Moses	92.204	
Aiwo	Richard Dugan Bill	89.775	
Aiwo	Alfred Aongo Moses	89.694	
Aiwo	Invalid/blank votes	10	
Aiwo	Total votes cast	338	
Anabar	James Deireragea	174.766	Elected
Anabar	Ludwig Scotty	150.149	Elected
Anabar	Godfrey Atsine Waidabu	109.483	
Anabar	David Peter Gadaraoa	103.516	
Anabar	Maein Deireragea	97.116	
Anabar	Felix Mirie Kun	80.366	
Anabar	Invalid/blank votes	10	
Anabar	Total votes cast	302	
Anetan	Remy Namaduk	195.420	Elected
Anetan	Vassal Gadoengin	175.851	Elected
Anetan	Lawrence Stephen	141.760	
Anetan	Gaiman Deireragea	111.896	
Anetan	Jac Tevaki Fritz	105.147	
Anetan	Jennie Solomon	104.075	
Anetan	Ruby Eidagarube Dediya	99.038	
Anetan	Rimone Tom	96.870	
Anetan	Invalid/blank votes	9	
Anetan	Total votes cast	388	
Boe	Kinza Clodumar	255.997	Elected
Boe	Ross Cain	180.975	Elected
Boe	Clinton Benjamin	158.841	
Boe	Chanda Pasulia Deiranauw	132.183	
Boe	August Detonga Deiye	120.510	
Boe	Isaac Eobwaoin Aremwa	117.295	
Boe	Michael Fury Roland	105.546	
Boe	Robinen Sam Billiam	105.478	
Boe	Invalid/blank votes	3	
Boe	Total votes cast	436	
Buada	Vinson Detenamo	118.328	Elected
Buada	Terangi Adam	103.433	Elected
Buada	Ruben Kun	98.419	
Buada	Nelson De-Burma Tamakin	84.778	
Buada	Tamaiti Willie Star	81.538	
Buada	Nicholas Depaune	80.063	
Buada	Trevor Gaderere Bernicke	70.669	
Buada	Manfred Rabaun Depaune	65.617	
Buada	Klenny Shoalhaven Harris	61.449	
Buada	Invalid/blank votes	15	
Buada	Total votes cast	288	
Meneng	Dogabe Abner Jeremiah	352.829	Elected
Meneng	Nimrod Botelanga	287.791	Elected
Meneng	Paul Deluckner Aingimea	166.932	
Meneng	Sprent Dabwido	154.139	
Meneng	Doneke Jim Kepae	151.442	
Meneng	Degababene Roxen Agadio	128.535	
Meneng	Joshua Porthos Baidongo Bop	124.484	
Meneng	Ralph Steven	119.741	
Meneng	Johnny Taumea	118.118	
Meneng	Invalid/blank votes	10	
Meneng	Total votes cast	587	
Ubenide	Bernard Dowiyogo	219.955	Elected
Ubenide	Aloysius Amwano	199.750	Elected
Ubenide	Derog Gioura	189.497	Elected
Ubenide	Joseph Hiram	178.516	Elected
Ubenide	David Adeang	162.732	
Ubenide	Ken Victor Detudamo	161.177	
Ubenide	Kennan Adeang	149.445	
Ubenide	Mark Dennis Kun	139.898	
Ubenide	Romys Eobob	134.206	
Ubenide	Fabian Ribauw	127.139	
Ubenide	Milton Jonathan Benjamin	124.739	
Ubenide	Eddy Nelson Conrad Scotty	120.901	
Ubenide	Renos Agege	108.746	
Ubenide	Lui Datar Tolvai Eoaeo	108.638	
Ubenide	Cecilia Limen	95.324	
Ubenide	Francis Detsibanga Amram	94.925	
Ubenide	Gavin Dekarube	91.203	
Ubenide	Dempsey Keppa	88.211	
Ubenide	Darnard Yunginwero Dongobir	76.906	
Ubenide	Charles Lanza Ratabwiy	68.727	
Ubenide	Invalid/blank votes	40	
Ubenide	Total votes cast	774	
Yaren	Pres Nimes Ekwona	128.081	Elected
Yaren	Anthony Audoa	106.841	Elected
Yaren	Ludwig Keke	80.706	
Yaren	Alfred Derangdedage Dick	77.370	
Yaren	John Daegan Akubor	75.966	
Yaren	Robert Rawate Snr. Kaierua	67.216	
Yaren	Ruby Eidebatongo Willis	65.386	
Yaren	Joseph Ludwig Cain	63.208	
Yaren	Terrence Bernard Debao	62.172	
Yaren	Brian Amwano	55.545	
Yaren	Ikelani Ruthven Capelle	50.976	
Yaren	Invalid/blank votes	21	
Yaren	Total votes cast	297	
Source: Republic of Nauru Government Gazette
