= Russell Kun =

Nauruan politician (born 1966)

The Honourable Russell Kun MP

Member of the Nauruan Parliament for Ubenide
- In office 5 May 2003 – 23 October 2004
- Preceded by: Bernard Dowiyogo
- Succeeded by: Frederick Pitcher

Speaker of the Parliament of Nauru
- In office 15 July 2004 – 26 October 2004
- Preceded by: Riddell Akua
- Succeeded by: Vassal Gadoengin

Personal details
- Born: Russell Effaney Kun; 24 May 1966 (age 60) Nauru
- Occupation: Secretary of Justice
- Profession: Lawyer

Russell Effaney Kun (born 24 May 1966) is a political figure from the Pacific nation of Nauru and former powerlifter.

== Background ==
In the May 2003 elections, Kun stood for the Parliament of Nauru and was elected to represent the Ubenide constituency.

== Political offices ==
Kun was Justice Minister in the Ludwig Scotty government from June to August 2003. He returned to that post under René Harris in February 2004. He was elected and served as Speaker of the Parliament of Nauru from 15 July 2004 to 26 October 2004.

In June 2004, Kun lost the post again when Scotty became president again and appointed David Adeang to the post. In September 2004, Kun created a controversy when he said that Health Minister Kieren Keke was ineligible to serve. He lost his seat in Parliament in October 2004.

== Post-parliamentary career ==
From 17 July 2005, Kun subsequently worked in the Public Defender's office in Majuro, Marshall Islands, along with Lionel Aingimea, the former legal officer of Nauru. From 19 April 2007, he was the Chief Public Defender of Marshall Islands and is still at this post.

Kun married Tote Una Kun, and they separated in 2007. They have two children: a daughter born 1991 in Auckland, and a son born 1994 in Wellington.

Kun is now living with his partner, Roselinda deBrum, of Likiep, Marshall Islands, and they have one daughter born 2006 in Majuro, Marshall Islands.

On 18 August 2010, Kun was sworn in as a citizen of the Marshall Islands.

== See also ==
- Politics of Nauru
