= Ministry of Justice and Border Control (Nauru) =

The Ministry of Justice and Border Control of Nauru upholds the Constitution, provides legal advice to the federal government and represents the interests of the country in civil and criminal matters.

== List of ministers (1972-present) ==
- Joseph Detsimea Audoa (1968–1976)
- Bernard Dowiyogo (1976–1977)
- Buraro Detudamo (1978)
- Kenas Aroi (1978–1979)
- Leo Keke (1979–1980)
- Joseph Detsimea Audoa (1980–1983)
- Bernard Dowiyogo (1984-1989)
- Vinci Niel Clodumar (1989)
- Kennan Adeang (1990)
- Pres Nîmes Ekwona (1990–1992)
- Ludwig Scotty (1993)
- Derog Gloura (1993-1995)
- Anthony Audoa (1996-1997)
- Vassal Gadoengin (1997-2001)
- Godfrey Thoma (2001–2008)
- Matthew Batsiua (2008-2012)
- Dominic Tabuna (2012-2013)
- Roland Kun (2013)
- David Adeang (2013–2019)
- Maverick Eoe (2019–2023)
- Russ Kun (2022–2023)
- Lionel Aingimea (2023–present)

== Organisation ==
The ministry is divided into six main sections:

- Office of the Secretary for Justice and Border Control
- Prosecution
- Regional Processing Centre Administration
- Immigration and Passport
- Quarantine
- Correctional Services
- Refugee Status Determination

=== Office of the Secretary for Justice and Border Control ===
The Office of the Secretary for Justice and Border Control is the administrative headquarters of Nauru's Ministry of Justice and Border Control. It is headed by the Secretary for Justice and Border Control, who serves as the department's chief executive and principal legal adviser.

The Office is responsible for the department's overall administration, policy coordination, financial management, staffing, and strategic direction. It also supports the Minister for Justice and Border Control and oversees the work of the department's various divisions, offices, and units.

==== Secretaries for Justice and Border Control (Nauru) ====
- Graham Leung — Secretary (March 2016 – May 2016)
- Jay Udit — Secretary (May 2016 – January 2026)
- Loretta Teueli — Acting Secretary (various periods from 2023–2026)
- Bhavna Narayan — Acting Secretary (various periods in 2025)
- Ravuanimasei Tagivakatini — Acting Secretary (various periods from 2025–present)

== See also ==
- Justice ministry
- Politics of Nauru
