= Leo Keke =

Nauruan lawyer and politician

The Honourable Leo Keke MP

Member of the Nauruan Parliament for Yaren
- In office 1976–1980
- Preceded by: Alfred Dick
- Succeeded by: Pres Nimes Ekwona

Personal details
- Born: 10 August 1947 Yaren District, Nauru
- Died: 8 November 2012 (aged 65) Brisbane, Australia
- Spouse: Lilva Stephen (m. 1985)
- Education: St Joseph's College; University of Tasmania

Leo Depagadogi Keke (10 August 1947 – 8 November 2012) was a Nauruan lawyer and politician. Keke was the first Nauruan lawyer. He served as an MP from 1976 to 1980. He was minister of justice from 1979 to 1980.

== Biography ==
Leo Keke was born on 10 August 1947, in the Yaren District of Nauru. He was the brother of Ludwig Keke, Nauru's first university graduate. Leo Keke first graduated from St. Joseph's College, and then went on to graduate with a law degree from the University of Tasmania in 1972. By 1974, Keke was admitted as a barrister and solicitor by the Supreme Court of the Australian Capital Territory. He was the first Nauruan lawyer. He was ultimately admitted to practice law in the Supreme Court of Nauru as well as the High Court of Australia. He practiced law with Blake & Riggall in Melbourne as a solicitor.

Keke was a member of the Nauru Party. He was first elected to parliament in 1976. He represented the Yaren Constituency. He was re-elected in 1977. That year, he was elected deputy speaker, unopposed, serving under the Speaker David Peter Gadaraoa for the year. On 5 January 1978, Keke was appointed as Minister of Works and Community Service by President Bernard Dowiyogo. On 29 April 1979, Keke was appointed as Minister of Justice by President Hammer DeRoburt. He served in that role until 1980. Keke was defeated in his attempt at re-election in 1980. His loss, along with two other prominent MPs' losses, in the 1980 election was characterized as a surprise by Pacific Islands Monthly. He unsuccessfully ran for parliament again in 1983, 2003, and 2004, as well as in a by-election in 1984.

Keke served as secretary for external affairs from 1981 to 1983. He served as secretary for island development and industries in 1983. He served as head of the legal and political division of the South Pacific Bureau for Economic Co-operation (now the Pacific Islands Forum Secretariat) from 1988 to at least 1991. From at least 1992 to 1994, Keke served as the president's legal counsel.

Keke became engaged to Lilva Stephen of the Ewa District on 7 February 1985. The couple was married by Rev. Itubwa Amram on 9 February 1985.

Keke served as president of the Nauru Judo Federation. He was also a member of the executive board of the Nauru Olympic Committee and the Commonwealth Games Association.

Keke died in Brisbane on 8 November 2012.
