= List of political parties in Nauru =

This article lists political parties in Nauru. In Nauru, political parties do not play a major role, as in many countries with parliamentary systems, but they have been formed. Officially, however, Nauru remains a non-party democracy.

As the parliamentary website puts it, "Nauru does not have a political party system, so all members of Parliament are effectively independent members. Whilst it is usual for members to form groups, the absence of party discipline means that such groups have often been fluid and subject to change during the term of a Parliament".

== Active parties ==
Name (English)	Name (Nauran)	Acronym	Leader	Political position & ideologies
Democratic Party of Nauru	-	DPN	David Adeang	-
Nauru First Party	Naoero Amo	NFP	Several	Liberalism Christian democracy
Centre Party	-	CP	Kinza Clodumar	-

== Former parties ==
Name (English)	Name (Nauran)	Acronym	Leader	Political position & ideologies	History
Nauru Party	-	NP	Unknown. But was formed by Lagumot Harris and Bernard Dowiyogo	-	Existed from 1975 to 1987. Succeeded by Democratic Party of Nauru

== See also ==
- Politics of Nauru
- List of political parties by country
