= 2008 Nauruan parliamentary election =

- 26 April 2008
- All 18 seats in the Parliament of Nauru
Party	Seats
Supporters of Marcus Stephen	12
Other independents	6
This lists parties that won seats. See the complete results below.
President before	President-designate
Marcus Stephen; Independent	Marcus Stephen; Independent

Parliamentary elections were held in Nauru on 26 April 2008, following the dissolving of Parliament by President Marcus Stephen on 18 April. The decision came after what Stephen referred to as "months of political deadlock". Of the parliament's eighteen members, nine supported the Stephen government and nine were in opposition.

== Events leading to election ==
The deadlock had been exacerbated by a crisis between the President and the Speaker of Parliament, Opposition member David Adeang. On 22 March, Adeang had called a Parliamentary session, allegedly without informing government ministers, who therefore did not attend. Opposition MPs, Adeang included, constituted a majority of legislators present, and passed a ruling outlawing dual citizenship for Members of Parliament. The ruling, if applied, would have affected senior Cabinet ministers Dr. Kieren Keke and Frederick Pitcher. Had they been compelled to resign from Parliament, the Opposition would have controlled a majority of seats in Parliament. The law was overturned as unconstitutional by the Supreme Court, and Adeang subsequently sought to suspend all pro-government MPs from Parliament, citing their allegedly "unruly behaviour". A week later, Stephen dissolved Parliament.

Two observers from the Pacific Islands Forum were present to monitor the election, at the request of the Nauruan government.

There were 65 candidates for the 18 seats, among whom were former Presidents Ludwig Scotty and René Harris.

== Results ==
All nine supporters of Stephen (Stephen himself, Kieren Keke, Mathew Batsiua, Roland Kun, Frederick Pitcher, Sprent Dabwido, former Speaker Riddell Akua, Dominic Tabuna and Rykers Solomon) were reelected, while three opposition MPs (former President René Harris, Cyril Buraman and Fabian Ribauw) lost their seats; the government claims it has thus won the election. Indeed, all three newly elected MPs joined the government and thereby ended the legislative deadlock. The new parliament was expected to hold its first session on 29 April 2008.

Party	Votes	%	Seats
Supporters of Marcus Stephen			12
Other candidates			6
Total			18
Total votes	4,607	–	
Registered voters/turnout	5,235	88.00	
Source: ABC Radio Australia, IPU

=== By constituency ===
Constituency	Candidate	Votes	Notes
Aiwo	Dantes Tsitsi	225.83	Re-elected
Aiwo	Godfrey Thoma	203.32	Re-elected after previous defeat
Aiwo	Aaron Cook	187.43	
Aiwo	René Harris	181.70	Unseated
Aiwo	Preston Thoma	152.77	
Aiwo	Elkoga Gadabu	136.75	
Aiwo	Invalid/blank votes	4	
Aiwo	Total Votes Cast	448	
Anabar	Ludwig Scotty	240.43	Re-elected
Anabar	Riddell Akua	227.67	Re-elected
Anabar	Tyrone Deiye	146.58	
Anabar	James Deireragea	146.52	
Anabar	David Peter Gadaraoa	125.06	
Anabar	Espen Jubal Fritz	105.12	
Anabar	Andre Adun	104.53	
Anabar	Corey Menke	100.96	
Anabar	Christopher Agiar Quadina	87.48	
Anabar	Invalid/blank votes	13	
Anabar	Total Votes Cast	467	
Anetan	Marcus Stephen	325.57	Re-elected
Anetan	Landon Deireragea	236.35	Elected
Anetan	Cyril Buraman	228.27	Unseated
Anetan	Remy Namaduk	211.02	
Anetan	Fabian Ika	181.57	
Anetan	Invalid/blank votes	6	
Anetan	Total Votes Cast	524	
Boe	Mathew Batsiua	266.88	Re-elected
Boe	Baron Waqa	229.18	Re-elected
Boe	Vollmer Mercury Appi	178.00	
Boe	Bernard Grundler	168.37	
Boe	Morgan Solomon	136.33	
Boe	Samuel Robinen Angabwiy	118.83	
Boe	Invalid/blank votes	2	
Boe	Total Votes Cast	450	
Buada	Shadlog Bernicke	193.30	Re-elected
Buada	Roland Kun	185.79	Re-elected
Buada	Vinson Detenamo	175.41	
Buada	Monte Depaune	150.95	
Buada	Alexander George Stephen	135.82	
Buada	Lionel Abungidage Fritz	114.13	
Buada	Yvette Duburiya	112.86	
Buada	Invalid/blank votes	8	
Buada	Total Votes Cast	420	
Meneng	Rykers Solomon	320.23	Re-elected
Meneng	Sprent Dabwido	316.20	Re-elected
Meneng	Doneke Benedict Kepae	225.19	
Meneng	Dogabe Jeremiah	207.75	
Meneng	Nemo Levi Agadio	187.62	
Meneng	Russell David Daoe	168.15	
Meneng	Jeziel Jeremiah	156.50	
Meneng	Darius Rock	147.62	
Meneng	Joseph Laben Hiram	144.22	
Meneng	Davey Roxen Agadio	137.62	
Meneng	Rick Daoe	136.04	
Meneng	Invalid/blank votes	25	
Meneng	Total Votes Cast	736	
Ubenide	Freddie Pitcher	481.59	Re-elected
Ubenide	David Adeang	406.76	Re-elected
Ubenide	Valdon Dowiyogo	383.00	Re-elected
Ubenide	Aloysius Amwano	308.47	Re-elected after three previous defeats
Ubenide	Ruston Marcus Kun	287.68	
Ubenide	Fabian Ribauw	260.03	Unseated
Ubenide	Alf Itsimaera	222.96	
Ubenide	Renos Renige Agege	190.52	
Ubenide	Michael Grillo Dekarube	183.29	
Ubenide	Adonis Gioura	183.09	
Ubenide	Skipper Hiram	176.89	
Ubenide	Briar-Rose Alona	173.74	
Ubenide	Ceila Cecilia Giouba	173.74	
Ubenide	Michael Fury Roland	169.59	
Ubenide	Dempsey Keppa	168.17	
Ubenide	Invalid/blank votes	48	
Ubenide	Total Votes Cast	1,184	
Yaren	Dominic Tabuna	227.83	Re-elected
Yaren	Kieren Keke	222.95	Re-elected
Yaren	Charmaine Scotty	166.90	
Yaren	John Daigon Julius	110.82	
Yaren	Brian Joseph Amwano	101.22	
Yaren	Johnny Taumea Agadio	91.48	
Yaren	Invalid/blank votes	2	
Yaren	Total Votes Cast	378	
Source: Republic of Nauru Government Gazette, 26 April 2008
