= Democratic Party of Nauru =

- Founded: 1987
- Parliament of Nauru: 0 / 19

The Democratic Party of Nauru (DPN) is a political party in the Oceanian nation of Nauru.

== Foundation and leadership ==
The DPN was founded after the January 1987 elections by former President Kennan Adeang after he had been ousted by Hammer DeRoburt for the second time in two months, with Adeang claiming the support of eight of the eighteen MPs. The party succeeded the informal Nauru Party headed by Bernard Dowiyogo which had existed since the 1970s. Dowiyogo then supported the DPN in the Parliament.

== Goals and influence ==
The most important goal of the DPN was to prevent an expansion of power by DeRoburt and to force the role of the Parliament. In 1989 DeRoburt had been ousted in a vote of no confidence by Kenos Aroi who had been supported by Adeang and his entourage but only for four months. Bernard Dowiyogo is the last DPN member to have been President of Nauru (2003). Afterwards, the DPN increasingly lost influence; considering it hasn't attained a seat in the Parliament since Dowiyogo's death in 2003.

In 2003 the son of Kennan Adeang, David Adeang, founded the Nauru First party.
