= 1989 Nauruan parliamentary election =

Parliamentary elections were held in Nauru on 9 December 1989, after the resignation of President Hammer DeRoburt following a vote of no-confidence in August and the subsequent resignation of his replacement, Kenas Aroi, for health reasons. Following the election Bernard Dowiyogo was elected President by the Parliament, defeating DeRoburt. Voter turnout was 88.7%.

== Results ==
Party	Votes	%	Seats
Independents	2,287	100.00	18
Total	2,287	100.00	18
Valid votes	2,287	97.53	
Invalid/blank votes	58	2.47	
Total votes	2,345	100.00	
Registered voters/turnout	2,659	88.19	
Source: Gazette, Nohlen et al.

=== By constituency ===
Constituency	Candidate	Votes	Notes
Aiwo	René Reynaldo Harris	151.75	Elected
Aiwo	Kinza Godfrey Clodumar	134.77	Elected
Aiwo	David Libokimedo Agir	121.43	
Aiwo	Patrick Deire Cook	104.96	
Aiwo	Marsh Deigoub Bill	83.25	
Aiwo	Pamela Eobtsina Scriven	77.58	
Aiwo	Invalid/blank votes	8	
Aiwo	Total votes cast	283	
Anabar	Ludwig Derangadage Scotty	152.3	Elected
Anabar	Obeira Menke	111	Elected
Anabar	Maein Deiregagea	92.3	
Anabar	Invalid/blank votes	1	
Anabar	Total votes cast	195	
Anetan	Roy Demanganuwe Degoregore	141.79	Elected
Anetan	Eidagarube Ruby Japhet	116.39	Elected
Anetan	Lawrence Stephen	106.42	
Anetan	Vassal Abogo Gadoengin	75.45	
Anetan	Rimone Tom	71.58	
Anetan	Adago Deinuwea Bucky Ika	69.25	
Anetan	Aloysius Gonzaga Namoduk	67.32	
Anetan	Invalid/blank votes	14	
Anetan	Total votes cast	264	
Boe	Hammer DeRoburt	144.61	Elected
Boe	Nangindeit Temanimon Kenas Aroi	142.3	Elected
Boe	Vollmer Mercury Appi	105.13	
Boe	August Detonga Deiye	89.65	
Boe	Tazio Gideon	87.11	
Boe	Invalid/blank votes	15	
Boe	Total votes cast	264	
Buada	Vinson Franco Detenamo	157.3	Elected
Buada	Ruben James Kun	114	Elected
Buada	Walwyn Bernicke	86.17	
Buada	Invalid/blank votes	2	
Buada	Total votes cast	197	
Meneng	Paul Denebaua Jeremiah	184.66	Elected
Meneng	Vinci Niel Clodumar	166.55	Elected
Meneng	Bobby Engitebo Ralph Eoe	156.52	
Meneng	Joshua Porthos Bop	112.93	
Meneng	Johnny Taumea	92.93	
Meneng	Adenoango Akeidu Kepae	90.87	
Meneng	Ralph Steven	82.3	
Meneng	Invalid/blank votes	15	
Meneng	Total votes cast	357	
Ubenide	Bernard Dowiyogo	294.5	Elected
Ubenide	Kennan Ranibok Adeang	235.37	Elected
Ubenide	Robidok Bagewa Buraro Detudamo	229.95	Elected
Ubenide	Gioura Derog	223.33	Elected
Ubenide	Mark Dennis Rueben Kun	207.53	
Ubenide	Paul Laurence Maginkieo Ribauw	162.17	
Ubenide	Invalid/blank votes	0	
Ubenide	Total votes cast	552	
Yaren	Pres Nimes Ekwona	143.42	Elected
Yaren	Ludwig Dowong Keke	114.22	Elected
Yaren	Anthony Kododo Destsimea Audoa	107.62	
Yaren	Alfred Derangoedage Dick	89.85	
Yaren	Fida Ewadangin Beiyoun Ika	70.7	
Yaren	Invalid/blank votes	3	
Yaren	Total votes cast	233	
Source: Republic of Nauru Government Gazette, 9 December 1989
