= Nauruan nationality law =

Naoero Citizenship Act

Parliament of Nauru
- Long title: An Act relating to Nauruan citizenship
- Enacted by: Government of Nauru
- Status: Current legislation

Nauruan nationality law is regulated by the 1968 Constitution of Nauru, as amended; the Naoero Citizenship Act of 2017, and its revisions; custom; and international agreements entered into by the Nauruan government. These laws determine who is, or is eligible to be, a national of Nauru. The legal means to acquire nationality, formal membership in a nation, differ from the domestic relationship of rights and obligations between a national and the nation, known as citizenship. Nauruan nationality is typically obtained either on the principle of jus soli, i.e. by birth in the Nauru or under the rules of jus sanguinis, i.e. by birth to parents with Nauruan nationality. Naturalization is only available to those with some connection to the country, such as the spouse of a citizen; no amount of time living in Nauru will, by itself, make one eligible for naturalization.

== Nauru and Commonwealth citizenship ==
Nauruans are also Commonwealth citizens by default.

== Acquiring Nauruan nationality ==
Nationality in Nauru is acquired at birth, later in life by naturalization, or by participating in the Climate Resilience Citizenship Program.

=== By birth ===
Birthright nationality applies to:

- Persons born anywhere, if either parent is Nauruan; or
- Persons born in Nauru who would otherwise be stateless.

=== By naturalization ===
Naturalization in Nauru is acquired only by having a relationship with a Nauruan national. Applications are submitted to the Cabinet member or Minister with the responsibility for the administration of immigration. Applicants must provide evidence that they are of good character and have familiarity with the language and customs of Nauru. In the case of a spouse, they must have been married for at least seven years and have resided within the territory for seven years. Honorary nationality and citizenship can be bestowed upon any person at the discretion of the President of Nauru after consultation with and meeting any requirements of the Cabinet. Persons who are eligible for naturalization include:

- The legal spouse (not a domestic partner) of a Nauruan national;
- A minor child, legally adopted by at least one Nauruan parent, effective with the court's issuance of an adoption order; or
- Persons who can prove rights to land ownership through biological descent of a Nauruan national.

=== By participating in the Climate Resilience Citizenship Program ===
Nauru has officially introduced the Nauru Economic and Climate Resilience Citizenship Program (NECRCP), unveiled at the 2024 United Nations Climate Change Conference (COP 29) in Baku. The program is defined in Nauru Economic and Climate Resilience Citizenship Act No. 15 of 2024 Part 2, Section 4, 2025.

It is a "citizenship by investment" initiative with the aim of raising money to fund climate action. The passport will cost a minimum of $105,000, but will be prohibited for people with certain criminal histories.

The government says selling citizenship will help raise the funds needed for a plan to move 90% of the island’s around 12,500-strong population onto higher ground and build an entirely new community.

== Loss of nationality ==
Nauruan nationals of legal majority and capacity may renounce their nationality provided they have obtained other nationality. Denaturalization may occur if a person obtained nationality through fraud, false representation, or concealment; if they financed or were convicted of terrorism; if they were convicted sexual offences against a child; or if they were naturalised, but continuously for 3 years resided outside Nauruan territory.

== Dual nationality ==
Dual nationality has been permitted for women who gained foreign nationality through marriage since independence. Since 2005, all Nauruans have been eligible for multiple nationality.

=== Attempted ban on dual citizenship for MPs, 2008 ===
On 22 March 2008, the Speaker of the Parliament of Nauru, David Adeang, called a Parliamentary session, allegedly without informing government ministers, who therefore did not attend. Opposition MPs, Adeang included, constituted a majority of legislators present, and passed a ruling outlawing dual citizenship for Members of Parliament.

The ruling, if applied, would have affected senior Cabinet ministers Dr. Kieren Keke and Frederick Pitcher. Were they compelled to resign from Parliament, the Opposition would have controlled a majority of seats in Parliament.

The government rejected the legitimacy of the ruling, stating that it was unconstitutional because of the lack of parliamentary quorum. President Marcus Stephen accused Adeang and the Opposition of passing the ruling "after dark on Easter Saturday", "under candlelight".

In April, the Chief Justice of the Supreme Court of Nauru ruled that the amendment to the citizenship law was unconstitutional, thus confirming that persons with dual nationality remain entitled to sit in Parliament.

== History ==
=== Pre-colonial (prehistory-1888) ===
The people who populated the island that would later become Nauru, were of Melanesian, Micronesian and Polynesian ancestry and remained isolated for several thousand years. The first inhabitants were likely shipwrecked on the island and stranded there. Society was organized into eleven matrilineal clans and one clan designated for foreigners. Clans were divided by social class: elites, known as temonibe; middle class land owners, known as ameneñame; and serfs, known as itsio. Though clan membership was established through maternity, fathers were typically the custodial parent of children. Property generally was inherited from the parents by their daughters, except boats and fishing supplies or weapons were passed from a father to a son. Wealth was measured in terms of tree rights, which could be inherited separately from other land rights.

In 1798, Europeans first reported sighting the island. John Fearn, a British whaler, located the island at 0°20' South latitude, 167°10' East longitude and named it Pleasant Island. Two decades later, in 1830, two convicts who escaped from the penal colony on Norfolk Island, Australia, Patrick Burke and John James, were among the first Europeans who settled on the island. Venetian, Francisco Michelena y Rojas visited the island in the 1830s and by the 1840s there were several Europeans who were escaped convicts or naval deserters living on the island. Europeans continued to arrive on Pleasant Island and most operated as beachcombers or traders. From the early part of the 19th century, there were conflicts among European powers, who were establishing spheres of influence in the Pacific in the race to secure resources to boost economic industry. In 1886, Germany and Britain signed the Anglo-German Declarations about the Western Pacific Ocean to establish terms of their interaction and delineate the territories with which each was aligned.

=== German colonial period (1888–1920) ===
The German trading firm of Jaluit-Gesellschaft was involved in the copra trade on the island and in 1888 made Pleasant Island a protectorate by annexing it. They called the island Navoda, Nawodo, or Onawero. Under the terms of the Colonial Act of 1888, German colonies were not part of the federal union, but they were also not considered foreign. Thus, laws that were extended to the colonies sometimes treated residents as nationals and other times as foreigners. Native subjects in the colonies were not considered to be German, but were allowed to naturalize. Naturalization required ten years residence in the territory and proof of self-employment. It was automatically bestowed upon all members of a family, meaning children and wives derived the nationality of the husband. The Nationality Law of 1913 changed the basis for acquiring German nationality from domicile to patrilineality, but did not alter derivative nationality.

In 1899, a rock which had been found on the island was tested and found to contain high levels of phosphate. Albert Ellis, an officer in the Pacific Islands Company stationed in Sydney journeyed to Ocean Island and Nauru to confirm the deposits of the mineral. Between 1900 and 1906 numerous trips were made to the island to prepare for setting up mining operations. In 1906, an agreement was drawn up between the British and German governments, and the Jaluit-Gesellschaft and Pacific Islands Company (newly renamed to Pacific Phosphate Company) sanctioning mining operations. When Germany was defeated in World War I, losing its Pacific colonies, a League of Nations mandate was established for Nauru.

=== Under trusteeship (1920–1968) ===
In 1920, the trusteeship of the island was assigned to Australia, New Zealand and the United Kingdom, and governed by Australia under the Nauru Island Agreement Act. The trustees acquired the assets and rights of the Pacific Phosphate Company, and administered the commercial operations through the British Phosphate Commission. The Island Agreement provided that the Australian government was authorised to issue ordinances to insure safety, order and good governance, as long as they did not interfere with the mining operations of the British Phosphate Commission. Within the first year of the trusteeship laws were promulgated to provide for the transition from German protectorate to British mandated rule. These basically replaced German statutes with the laws of Queensland, but retained private property statutes.

The arrangement technically violated the terms of the British mandate, as the Allied Powers had explicitly awarded the Mandate for Nauru to Britain. The League of Nations had oversight for the mandates and questioned Australia's role in controlling the administration, why the three nations were sharing the trusteeship, and how the monopolization of phosphate mining to fund the administration of the trusteeship did not violate the principles of self-determination and free trade. These questions remained unresolved throughout the mandate period. Under British law, mandated territories were outside the Crown's dominions, meaning British nationality laws did not apply to natives, but only to British subjects born to British fathers who may have been domiciled in a mandated place. (Note: A commission was convened in 1946 to review nationality of the inhabitants in former German colonies. It concluded that inhabitants of "C"-type mandates did not acquire British nationality and if they had been German nationals under the terms of the 1913 Nationality law, they became stateless when Germany abandoned its territories. According to D. P. O'Connell, they were deemed to be "lacking nationality but enjoying an administrative status analogous to that of inhabitants of British protectorates".) In 1921 the Nauru Lands Ordinance was passed prohibiting Nauruans from contracting, leasing, or selling their land. That same year, the Native Status Ordinance of 1921, defined natives as aboriginals of any East Indian, Malaysian, or Pacific Island and established regulations for criminal and civil offences, marriage, property, and affairs affecting natives. To ensure that natives remained within their communities, the district chief had to consent to any marriages in his area. Children born to natives derived the native status of their parents.

The administrators' paternalistic vision saw natives as wards whose identity was defined within their families and clans. hereditary chiefs, who were confirmed by election, had limited power to self-govern and to administer their districts and the Nauruan communities within them. As Nauruans did not work in the phosphate mines, indentured workers, mainly Chinese, were brought in to work the mines for the British Phosphate Commission. Australian administrators prohibited Chinese workers from gaining permanent residency on the island, though their indentures could be extended. Ethnic divisions on the island were imposed through the restrictive laws, which kept community members within their own groups. By the Movements of Natives Ordinance, any person who was not European was restricted from entering European settlements after sunset until 5 a.m., unless they had assimilated to European custom and had a certificate of exemption.

From the mid-1930s, geopolitical tension began escalating, but mining in Nauru continued until December 1940, when German troops raided and attempted to take the island. In 1942, Japanese forces took the island and evacuated most of the Nauruan population to Chuuk atoll. The US Army captured the Pacific Islands that had been part of the South Seas Mandate by 1944, but left Nauru in Japanese hands. Nearly one month after the Japanese surrender of the Pacific to the United States, on 13 September 1945, an Australian convoy secured the surrender of Japanese troops remaining on Nauru. The Australians deported the Japanese remaining on the island, repatriated other Pacific Islanders who had been removed to Nauru, and in 1946 returned the Nauruans who had been evacuated to Chuuk to their home island.

In 1945, the United Nations replaced the League of Nations and reevaluated the trusteeship program. Mandates were replaced by Trust Territories to be overseen by a Trusteeship Council. In 1947, Australia submitted a draft of the Nauru Trusteeship Agreement, reiterating the previous arrangement of the tripartite administration in conjunction with the British Phosphate Commission. In a vote of forty-six in favor to six in opposition the terms were approved by the United Nations General Assembly. Under the terms of the British Nationality and Citizenship Act 1948, Nauruans were neither British subjects nor British Protected Persons. Instead they were considered Australian Protected Persons and able to acquire an Australian passport or naturalisation and travel privileges equal to those of other Commonwealth citizens.

In 1956, the administration passed the Nauruan Community Ordinance, which defined members of the Nauruan community as the people who were indigenous to Nauru, Pacific Islanders married to Nauruans, or persons that local chiefs had admitted to the community by traditional custom. The ordinance provided that nationality was conferred on children born within the territory to persons accepted into the Nauruan community; spouses of Nauruans, unless they chose to retain other nationality; and children of mixed marriages between Nauruans and Pacific Islanders, unless they chose to retain other nationality or a court determined that Nauruan status was necessary to protect the interests of the child. Loss of nationality typically resulted from acquiring other nationality except through marriage, giving up residence on the island for naturalised persons, treason or disloyalty to the state, or falsely having obtained naturalisation.

Discontent from islanders with the trustee administration in the 1950s and increased pressure from the Trusteeship Council to advance political agency and self-governance or independence grew as the 1960s approached. Nauruans and the Trusteeship Council recognised that the rights of the native inhabitants were subordinate to phosphate mining when it was proposed in 1960 that Nauruans be relocated to another island. Nauruans rejected the idea as they believed they would be unable to retain their national identity if they were absorbed into an existing population elsewhere. In 1962, Nauruans proposed adopting their own constitution, legislature, judiciary and administrative departments to allow a sovereign Nauruan nation to be governed by its own people. As 1967 approached, negotiations intensified in recognition that the 1947 trusteeship would expire. Beginning in 1965, negotiations began to resolve the matters of Nauruan independence and rehabilitation of the environment because of mining. The Nauru Act 1965 established the Nauru Legislative Council and the Executive Council, which were installed on 31 January 1966 and appointed committees to plan for independence on 31 January 1968.

=== Post-independence (1968–present) ===
Under the terms of the Nauru Independence Act 1967, administration by Australia ceased, the Nauru Act 1965 was repealed, as were all acts that had previously been extended to the country. The Independence Act was approved by the Trusteeship Council and a constitutional convention drafted new governing documents. The constitution of 1968 incorporated the definitions in the Nauruan Community Ordinance of 1956, bestowing upon community members, nationality at independence. The Community Ordinance was amended numerous times and in 1997 established a scheme for persons to obtain nationality through investment. The program ran from 1998 until it was suspended in 2003. In 2005, the Community Ordinance was repealed and replaced by the Naoero Citizenship Act 2005. Terms of the act allowed for dual nationality and granted either spouse the right to obtain nationality through marriage, though the constitutional provision for only women to derive nationality from a spouse remained as of 2020. In 2017, the Citizenship Act was repealed and replaced with the current legislation. In 2025, Nauru started to sell citizenships to fund the relocation of the population inland to escape rising sea levels.
