= Landon Deireragea =

Nauruan politician

The Honourable Landon Deireragea MP

Member of the Nauruan Parliament for Anetan
- In office April 26, 2008 – June 8, 2013
- Preceded by: Cyril Buraman
- Succeeded by: Cyril Buraman

Acting Speaker of Parliament
- In office April 18, 2013 – April 25, 2013
- Preceded by: Ludwig Scotty
- Succeeded by: Godfrey Thoma
- In office July 9, 2010 – November 1, 2010
- Preceded by: Aloysius Amwano
- Succeeded by: Ludwig Scotty

Personal details
- Born: 16 May 1960 (age 65) Nauru
- Occupation: electrician

Landon Deireragea (born 16 May 1960) is a Nauruan politician.

== Parliamentary role ==
Deireragea has been elected to parliament in the 2008 general elections, gaining the seat of Cyril Buraman.

He represents the Anetan Constituency in the Parliament of Nauru.

Deireragea was defeated in the 2013 parliamentary elections, with Cyril Buraman taking the seat.

== Deputy Speaker ==
After the June 2010 general elections Deireragea was elected Deputy Speaker of Parliament. In this role he deputizes for the Speaker of Parliament. Thus far in his term the office of speaker has fallen vacant twice, during which time Deireragea became Acting Speaker. The first period was the longest, July 9 until November 1, 2010. This period of vacancy was caused by the removal of Aloysius Amwano from office and was drawn out by deadlock over who should be speaker. Finally Ludwig Scotty was elected, ending Deireragea's acting speakership. The second period was brief, from April 18 until April 25, 2013, between the resignation of Speaker Scotty and the election of Godfrey Thoma.

== Background ==
Deireragea is a close relative of former parliamentarians Maein Deireragea and James Deireragea, who both served in the parliament for the Anabar Constituency. Politics in Nauru tends to be family oriented.

== See also ==
- Politics of Nauru
- Elections in Nauru
- 2008 Nauruan parliamentary election
