= 1987 Nauruan parliamentary election =

Early parliamentary elections were held in Nauru on 24 January 1987. The Parliament elected in December 1986 had nine supporters of Kennan Adeang and nine of former president Hammer DeRoburt. The resulting deadlock was broken when Adeang supporter Kinza Clodumar switched sides, resulting in Parliament being dissolved. As there were no political parties, all of the fifty-plus candidates ran as independents. Voter turnout was 92.67%.

Supporters of President Hammer DeRoburt were won eleven of the eighteen seats, resulting in him being re-elected president.

== Results ==
| Party | Votes | % | Seats |
|---|---|---|---|
| Independents | 2,210 | 100.00 | 18 |
| Total | 2,210 | 100.00 | 18 |
| Valid votes | 2,210 | 97.61 | |
| Invalid/blank votes | 54 | 2.39 | |
| Total votes | 2,264 | 100.00 | |
| Registered voters/turnout | 2,443 | 92.67 | |
Source: IPU

=== By constituency ===
| Constituency | Candidate | Votes | Notes |
|---|---|---|---|
| Aiwo | René Harris | 141.278 | Elected |
| Aiwo | Kinza Clodumar | 126.529 | Elected |
| Aiwo | Patrick Deiri Cook | 113.363 | |
| Aiwo | Ephraim Rotemwemweo Gadabu | 74.111 | |
| Aiwo | David Libogmedo Agir | 71.435 | |
| Aiwo | Reginald Roderick Akiri | 67.970 | |
| Aiwo | Pamela Eibutsina Scriven | 66.45 | |
| Aiwo | Ririenang Allen Thoma | 64.528 | |
| Aiwo | Invalid/blank votes | 8 | |
| Aiwo | Total votes cast | 275 | |
| Anabar | Ludwig Scotty | 126 | Elected |
| Anabar | Maein Deireragea | 92.666 | Elected |
| Anabar | Godfrey Waidabu | 86.666 | |
| Anabar | David Peter Gadaraoa | 75.916 | |
| Anabar | Invalid/blank votes | 4 | |
| Anabar | Total votes cast | 187 | |
| Anetan | Roy Degoregore | 145.616 | Elected |
| Anetan | Ruby Dediya | 131.416 | Elected |
| Anetan | Lawrence Stephen | 117.45 | |
| Anetan | Aloysius Gonzaga Namoduk | 86.25 | |
| Anetan | Vassal Gadoengin | 83.15 | |
| Anetan | Julie Olsson | 75.566 | |
| Anetan | Invalid/blank votes | 5 | |
| Anetan | Total votes cast | 266 | |
| Boe | Kenas Aroi | 139.1 | Elected |
| Boe | Hammer DeRoburt | 132.283 | Elected |
| Boe | Vollmer Mercury Appi | 106.45 | |
| Boe | Augusta Detonga Deiye | 79.9 | |
| Boe | Joske Arthur Teabuge | 72 | |
| Boe | Invalid/blank votes | 3 | |
| Boe | Total votes cast | 235 | |
| Buada | Vinson Detenamo | 119.5 | Elected |
| Buada | Reuben Kun | 113.933 | Elected |
| Buada | Manfred Rabaima Depaune | 86.766 | |
| Buada | Alec Hindmarsh Stephen | 61.116 | |
| Buada | Iduick Rockson Randolph | 59.85 | |
| Buada | Robin Karl Wilson A. Tamakin | 51.283 | |
| Buada | Invalid/blank votes | 6 | |
| Buada | Total votes cast | 207 | |
| Meneng | Robert Eoe | 143.55 | Elected |
| Meneng | Vinci Niel Clodumar | 134.107 | Elected |
| Meneng | Paul Denebauwa Jeremiah | 130.974 | |
| Meneng | Parcelle Bop | 102.107 | |
| Meneng | Nimrod Botelanga | 99.211 | |
| Meneng | Akeidu Adenoango Kepae | 83.503 | |
| Meneng | Taumea Johnny Agadio | 74.4 | |
| Meneng | Ralph Steven | 73.826 | |
| Meneng | Alec Dogaben Harris | 66.096 | |
| Meneng | Invalid/blank votes | 14 | |
| Meneng | Total votes cast | 335 | |
| Ubenide | Bernard Dowiyogo | 234.861 | Elected |
| Ubenide | Kennan Adeang | 232.159 | Elected |
| Ubenide | Buraro Detudamo | 219.238 | Elected |
| Ubenide | Derog Gioura | 213.342 | Elected |
| Ubenide | Lagumot Harris | 151.126 | |
| Ubenide | Paul Lawrence Maginkieo Ribauw | 139.623 | |
| Ubenide | Joseph Hiram | 119.040 | |
| Ubenide | Invalid/blank votes | 13 | |
| Ubenide | Total votes cast | 518 | |
| Yaren | Pres-Nimes Ekwona | 169.5 | Elected |
| Yaren | Anthony Audoa | 143.5 | Elected |
| Yaren | Ludwig Keke | 127 | |
| Yaren | Invalid/blank votes | 1 | |
| Yaren | Total votes cast | 241 | |
Source: Government Gazette
