= Pres Nimes Ekwona =

Nauruan politician (born 1948)

The Honourable Pres Nimes Ekwona MP

Speaker of the Parliament of Nauru
- In office 1986–1987
- Preceded by: Kinza Clodumar
- Succeeded by: Derog Gioura

Member of the Nauruan Parliament for Yaren
- In office 2000–2004
- Preceded by: Ludwig Keke
- Succeeded by: Dominic Tabuna
- In office 1980–1997
- Preceded by: Leo Keke
- Succeeded by: Ludwig Keke

Personal details
- Born: 22 June 1948 (age 78)

Pres Nimes Ekwona (Note: He is also referred to as Pres-Nimes Ekwona, Pres Nimes Ekwona Dabwadauw, and Pres Nimes Dabwadauw.) (born 22 June 1948) is a Nauruan politician and lawyer.

== Biography ==
Ekwona was born on 22 June 1948. In 1986, he was admitted to the Nauru Bar.

In 1976 and 1977, Ekwona unsuccessfully ran for the parliament seat representing the Yaren Constituency. Ekwona was elected to parliament in 1980. He was re-elected in 1983 and 1986. On 18 September 1986, Ekwona was appointed minister of health and education by President Kennan Adeang. When President Hammer DeRoburt regained power in October 1986, he replaced Ekwona with Lawrence Stephen in his cabinet. After President Adeang was re-elected, he appointed Ekwona as minister of works and community services, as well as minister of external affairs on 15 December 1986.

Ekwona served as speaker of parliament between 1986 and 1987. He was re-elected to parliament in 1987, 1989, and 1992. On 28 May 1990, President Bernard Dowiyogo appointed Ekwona as justice minister. President Dowiyogo appointed Ekwona as minister of education on 16 September 1993. He was re-elected again in 1995. He was defeated in the 1997 election. He was unsuccessful in an attempt to regain his old parliament seat in a 1998 by-election. He regained his parliament seat in the 2000 election. He was re-elected in 2003, before being defeated in 2004. He was again defeated in 2007 and April 2010.

Ekwona served as team manager for the Nauruan team at the 2000 Olympic Games. He was elected as secretary general of the Nauru Olympic Committee on 23 January 2009.
