= Corruption in Nauru =

Corruption in Nauru remains a significant problem and is particularly evident in political corruption and financial mismanagement. According to Transparency International nepotism and political interference in Nauru's government operations are also present, undermining accountability and efficiency. In recent years, the economic reliance on phosphate mining has also made this sector vulnerable to corruption, with allegations of bribery and illicit dealings affecting resource management.

== Political corruption ==
Political corruption remains a pressing issue in Nauru, with persistent reports of electoral manipulation undermining democratic integrity. Freedom House has documented widespread bribery during elections, highlighting claims from a former representative who alleged that candidates routinely offer motorcycles and household goods to secure votes. In 2016, two former Nauru presidents, Marcus Stephen and Sprent Dabwindo, publicly raised concerns about electoral corruption, accusing officials of engaging in vote-buying schemes and tampering with electoral rolls to influence outcomes.

Political corruption in Nauru has also been linked to undisclosed financial transactions from Australia to local officials. In the move to address economic challenges, Nauru has hosted Australia's offshore asylum seeker processing centers since 2013, a policy that has drawn significant scrutiny. The Sydney-based Refugee Action Coalition has criticized the arrangement, describing it as a “corrupt deal” in which Australia is said to have effectively purchased Nauru's cooperation to prevent refugees from entering its borders.

It is alleged that Australia's Home Affairs Department paid millions to powerful politicians both in Nauru and Papua New Guinea through a chain of contracts involving the department's lead contractors – Broadspectrum, Canstruct, and Paladin - in order to secure the processing centers in both countries. Dabwindo, who signed the offshore detention deal with then prime minister Julia Gillard, stated later that he regretted signing the treaty. He claimed that it had led to corruption and greed instead of quickly establishing Nauru economic development.

== Phosphate industry ==
The phosphate industry used to be the backbone of Nauru's economy and the country was once considered one of the world's wealthiest per capita. When the phosphate deposits were exhausted around 1968, the country went bankrupt. Facing a severe financial crisis on account of financial mismanagement and corruption in the 1990s, Nauru sought alternative revenue streams by transforming itself into a money-laundering haven, selling banking licenses and passports that granted immunity to holders.

Although phosphate mining has declined, operations have persisted, and the industry has been marred by multiple corruption scandals in recent years. One significant corruption case involved Getax Australia, a Gold Coast-based phosphate company, which was charged with conspiracy to bribe Nauruan officials to secure favorable business deals. The Australian Federal Police (AFP) investigated allegations that Getax bribed politicians between 2007 and 2012 to influence phosphate exports. Despite the charges, enforcement has been slow, and legal proceedings have faced delays.

Another case involved Mozammil Bhojani, a Sydney businessman who was charged with paying over $120,000 in kickbacks to Nauruan officials, including an MP and a government minister, in exchange for favorable phosphate shipments for his Radiance International group of companies. Bhojani pleaded guilty and was sentenced to two and a half years in jail in 2018. This incident highlights the vulnerabilities in Nauru's resource management and the influence of external actors in corrupt dealings. The lack of stringent financial oversight has allowed such practices to persist, raising concerns about governance and transparency.

== Anti-corruption measures ==
Nauru has made efforts to improve governance through legislative reforms and international partnerships. The country has engaged with international organizations such as the United Nations Office on Drugs and Crime (UNODC) to improve governance and transparency. The government had also created agencies such as the Financial Intelligence Unit and the Public Audit Office, which contribute to the monitoring of financial activities.

Nauru notably lacks a dedicated anti-corruption body, such as an Ombudsman's office, and has yet to implement a comprehensive strategy to effectively combat corruption. For this reason, the legal framework and its authority to enhance transparency in public administration as well as the capability for law enforcement remains weak.
