= Freddie Pitcher =

President of Nauru in 2011

His Excellency Freddie Pitcher
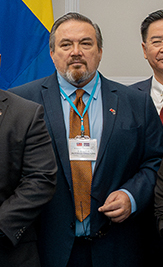
- Pitcher in 2023

President of Nauru
- In office 10 November 2011 – 15 November 2011
- Deputy: Mathew Batsiua
- Preceded by: Marcus Stephen
- Succeeded by: Sprent Dabwido

Member of the Nauruan Parliament for Ubenide
- In office 23 October 2004 – 8 June 2013
- Preceded by: Russell E. Kun
- Succeeded by: Ranin Akua

Personal details
- Born: 5 February 1967 (age 59)
- Party: Nauru First
- Education: Macquarie University

Frederick William Pitcher (born 5 February 1967) is a Nauruan politician and diplomat who served as the President of Nauru from 10 to 15 November 2011.

In December 2007, Pitcher was appointed Minister of Finance of Nauru, to serve in the Administration of President Marcus Stephen. Pitcher became the President of Nauru on 10 November 2011, following the resignation of his predecessor, former President Marcus Stephen. He lost a parliamentary vote of confidence and lost the presidency on 15 November 2011 after only 6 days in power.

Pitcher became the permanent representative of Nauru at the United Nations Office at Geneva in January 2025. He became ambassador from Nauru to Switzerland in May 2025.

== Background and earlier career ==
Pitcher attended Macquarie University in Sydney, Australia from 1988 to 1991. He obtained a bachelor of arts degree in Pacific studies.

Educated in Australia, where Pitcher also has many family connections, he was viewed as a young reformist during the preceding Administration of President Ludwig Scotty, and was perceived as close to Kieren Keke, who joined the Marcus Stephen Administration as Foreign Minister. Pitcher was the deputy permanent representative to the UN in New York from 2000 to 2004. He was elected to the Parliament of Nauru in 2004 from Ubenide constituency. He also served as minister for commerce, industry and environment from 2004 to 2010 in the administration of President Ludwig Scotty.

== Finance Minister, 2007 ==
On coming to office, as Minister of Finance, Pitcher inherited the burden of the austerity measures associated with the outgoing Scotty Administration.

In March 2008, the speaker of the Parliament of Nauru, David Adeang, attempted to have Pitcher expelled from Parliament, by summoning a Parliamentary session, allegedly without informing members of the government, which resulted in the passing of a law forbidding Members of Parliament to hold dual citizenship. President Stephen argued that the law was unconstitutional; Adeang said it was not. On 28 March, Adeang ordered Pitcher and another minister, Kieren Keke, to vacate their seats in Parliament, since they both hold dual Nauruan and Australian citizenship. The two ministers refused to do so, and Adeang suspended the sitting.

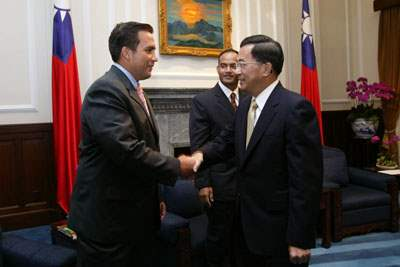
Pitcher and David Adeang meeting Chen Shui-bian

== President of Nauru ==
On 10 November 2011, incumbent Nauru President Marcus Stephen resigned from the presidency amid corruption allegations. Opposition MPs had accused Stephen of seeking to illegally profit from a phosphate deal. Specifically, opposition leader David Adeang accused Stephen of soliciting potential kickbacks from Thai businesspeople looking to buy phosphates in Nauru. Stephen called the charges "unwarranted and mischievous." He resigned the presidency, but remained in parliament.

Frederick Pitcher, who had previously served as Minister for Commerce, Industry and Environment, became the new President of Nauru on the same day as Stephen's resignation. Pitcher was elected president by the same nine members of parliament who had supported the outgoing Stephen government. Mathew Batsiua, the former health minister, was also named Nauru's new foreign minister, replacing Kieren Keke. Pitcher retained Stephen in his cabinet reshuffle.

Pitcher dismissed corruption allegations against Stephen as baseless upon taking office, telling reporters, "There was no evidence or proof. I think Marcus himself felt that this whole discussion had become a distraction to parliament and to government and he offered to resign. I think he did a noble thing and I applaud him for it. So far allegations [go] I think they were only allegations. I saw nothing to prove they were anything other than false allegations."

Pitcher's presidency was not expected to affect the Australian opposition's plan to open a new immigration centre in Nauru.

=== Loss of Parliamentary confidence vote ===
After the defection of one of his supporters Pitcher lost a parliamentary vote of confidence and the presidency on 15 November. Sprent Dabwido was elected as his successor.

== Out of Parliament ==
Former President Pitcher was defeated for re-election to Parliament in elections held in June 2013. He was again defeated in a parliamentary election in 2016.

Pitcher presented his credentials to the director-general of the United Nations Office at Geneva on 28 January 2025, becoming the permanent representative of Nauru at that office. Pitcher presented his credentials to Swiss President Karin Keller-Sutter as Nauruan ambassador to Switzerland on 3 May 2025.

== See also ==
- 2008 Nauruan parliamentary election
- Politics in Nauru

Political offices
Preceded by Marcus Stephen	President of Nauru; 2011	Succeeded by Sprent Dabwido
