= Centre Party (Nauru) =

- Leader: Kinza Clodumar
- Parliament of Nauru: 0 / 19

The Centre Party was an informal political party in the Pacific nation of Nauru. It was led by Kinza Clodumar.

== Foundation ==
The party was formed by the former President of Nauru, Kinza Clodumar, and supported René Harris, Clodumar's ally, in the Parliament, mainly in votes of no confidence for or against Harris.

== Political role ==
The CP has only played a minor role in the Nauruan Parliament and in the political life in Nauru. The party's elected representative was Kinza Clodumar as an MP from 1997 until 2003. Clodumar mounted a failed bid to return to parliament in the 23 October 2004 general election.

== See also ==
- Politics of Nauru
