= State House, Nauru =

Official residence of the President of Nauru

- Interactive map of the State House, Nauru area

General information
- Status: complete; partially under construction
- Location: Denigomodu, Nauru
- Current tenants: President of Nauru (David Adeang)
- Year built: 2017
- Owner: Government of Nauru

The State House in Nauru is the official residence of the president of the Republic of Nauru, located at Cliff Lodge, Denigomodu. It replaced the former state house, Camp State House in Meneng, which became an Australian detention camp site since 2001, when it became detention centre by the Howard government's Pacific Solution. After the camp had been inactive, it was rebuilt and is now used as Nauru Primary School, some government departments, and a government warehouse.

After the former State House was turned into a refugee camp, there was no official residence for the president for a long time. For replacement, the current State House was built in 2017 for President Baron Waqa. The site was initially the home of the manager of the British Phosphate Commission, and later the home of the manager of the Nauru Phosphate Corporation.

While the current site was landleased for 50 years for additional 20 years in the first place, in 2026, the Nauru government announced a new plan, following another landlease nearby for 77 years, to extend to a two story building, which contains a space for special government events.
