= Joseph Hiram =

Nauruan politician (born 1943)

The Honourable Joseph Hiram MP

Member of the Nauruan Parliament for Ubenide
- In office 2000–2001
- Succeeded by: David Adeang

Personal details
- Born: 10 March 1943 (age 83)
- Education: Gordon Institute, Geelong

Joseph Laben Hiram (born 10 March 1943) is a retired Nauruan public servant and politician.

== Biography ==
Hiram was born on 10 March 1943. He studied at Gordon Institute in Geelong, Victoria in Australia. When Nauru gained independence in 1968, Hiram lived in Melbourne and was working for the British Phosphate Commissioners as a junior mechanical engineer. After the country's founding, he helped to establish the Melbourne office of the Nauru Phosphate Corporation.

Hiram worked for the Nauruan government for 40 years. At some point, Hiram had served as a mechanical engineer for RONPhos and as Nauru's director of civil aviation. By 2002, Hiram was general manager of the Nauru Phosphate Corporation. By 2008, Hiram had retired from work.

Hiram has unsuccessfully ran to represent the Ubenide Constituency in the Parliament of Nauru several times. He ran in the following years: 1976, 1977, 1980, 1987, and 1994 (by-election). Hiram was successfully elected in the 2000 election. On 8 December 2001, another election was held in the Ubenide Constituency, in which Hiram was unseated by David Adeang. Hiram continued to run for the Ubenide seat in the elections in 2003 and 2004. He ran for the Meneng Constituency in 2007 and 2008. Hiram ran for the Ubenide seat again in April 2010.
