= Cyril Buraman =

Nauruan politician (born 1959)

The Honourable Cyril Buraman MP

Speaker of the Parliament of Nauru
- In office 13 July 2016 – August 2019
- Preceded by: Ludwig Scotty
- Succeeded by: Marcus Stephen

Personal details
- Born: 12 November 1959 (age 67) Nauru

Cyril Buraman (born 12 November 1959) is a Nauruan political figure and member of the Parliament of Nauru.

== Background ==
Buraman was born on 12 November 1959, registered to the Anetan District. He is a member of the Ranibok tribe.

Buraman stood for, and was duly elected to, the Parliament of Nauru, where the party system is not fully developed, and in 2007 was seen as an opponent of the incoming Administration of President Marcus Stephen.

== Events of 2008 ==
=== Alliance with Parliamentary Speaker ===
In March 2008 David Adeang was appointed Speaker of the Parliament of Nauru and Buraman was regarded as tactically close to Adeang and to former President of Nauru René Harris, who was at the time still retained his Parliamentary seat and exercised a role as a leading member of the Opposition.

=== April 2008 ===
In April 2008 Buraman stood again, but lost his seat in the Parliament of Nauru, as did former President René Harris.

== Return to Parliament ==
In June 2013 Buraman was re-elected to Parliament for Anetan. He was the Speaker of the Parliament of Nauru from 13 July 2016 to 27 July 2019.

Having been unseated in the 2019 Parliamentary election, Buraman stood unsuccessfully to regain his Anetan seat in 2022.

== Personal life ==
Buramen became engaged to Sharon Bam, of the Uaboe district, on 13 January 1981. The couple married on 23 January 1981.

== See also ==
- 2008 Nauruan parliamentary election
- Politics of Nauru
