= Terangi Adam =

Nauruan politician

The Honourable Terangi Adam MP

Member of the Nauruan Parliament for Buada
- In office April 8, 2000 – August 26, 2007
- Preceded by: Ruben Kun
- Succeeded by: Shadlog Bernicke

Speaker of the Parliament of Nauru
- In office 6 April 2004 – 2004
- Preceded by: Ludwig Scotty
- Succeeded by: David Adeang

Personal details
- Born: 8 August 1947 (age 78) Nauru

Lyn Terangi Adam (born August 8, 1947) is a Nauruan politician.

== Political role ==
Living at the Buada Lagoon, Adam was elected to the Parliament of Nauru for the Buada Constituency in the 2000 general elections. This was somewhat of a noted achievement, given that Adam thereby ousted former President of Nauru Ruben Kun from his Parliamentary seat. He was acting Speaker of the Parliament of Nauru in July 2004.

=== Loss of Parliamentary seat ===
In 2007 he lost his seat to Shadlog Bernicke. He again sought election in April 2010 but failed to get elected.

== See also ==
- Politics of Nauru
- Elections in Nauru
