= Nauru First =

Political party in Nauru

Nauru First Naoero Amo
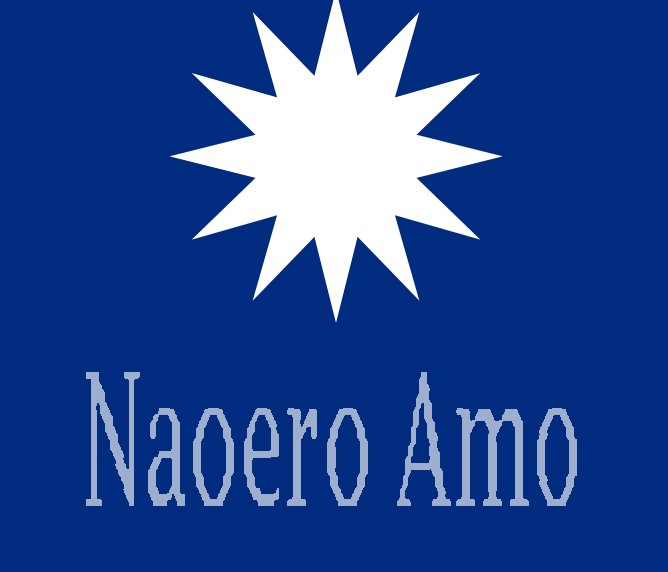
- Founded: 2003
- Ideology: Liberalism; Christian democracy
- Political position: Centre-right
- Parliament: 5 / 19

Nauru First (Nauruan: Naoero Amo) is the only formal political party in Nauru.

== Philosophy and leading members ==
Its positions tend to be liberal, pro-government transparency, and Christian democratic. Its founding members were Kieren Keke (a medical doctor), David Adeang (a legal counsel and former minister of finance), Marlene Moses (former health minister), Roland Kun (director of the island's fisheries), Sean Oppenheimer (manager of Capelle's, the country's largest private enterprise), who has since resigned from the party due to death threats, and Sprent Dabwido (an insurance worker). Its official publication is the irregularly-published The Visionary, which contains harsh criticism of government officials.

== Elections ==
In the May 2003 elections three members of Naoero Amo were elected: David Adeang, Kieren Keke, and Riddell Akua. Adeang became finance minister and Keke minister of health, sports, and transportation. Akua became the Chairman of Nauru Phosphate Corporation. The ministers lost their posts when President Ludwig Scotty's government was ousted in August 2003 but regained new posts when he returned to power on 22 June 2004.

Adeang was the Minister of Foreign Affairs and the Minister of Finance. The party continued to support President Scotty, and in the 2007 parliamentary elections, Scotty supporters won most of the seats in Parliament. The party system in Nauru remains somewhat fluid and it is not known how many of these supporters are members of the Nauru First Party, but it is known that most of the members currently supporting Scotty were reelected, including Adeang.

== Controversies ==
In December 2007, a dispute among Nauru First Party members David Adeang, Kieren Keke and others led to a vote of no-confidence in the Parliament of Nauru, unseating the Administration of the President of Nauru, Ludwig Scotty, and the appointment of a government led by newly appointed President Marcus Stephen. This new Administration excluded Adeang in the ministerial team; he was replaced as minister for Foreign Affairs by Keke.
