= President of Nauru =

Head of state and government

President of the Republic of Naoero
- Pretiden Naoero (Nauruan)
- Seal of Government of the Republic of Naoero

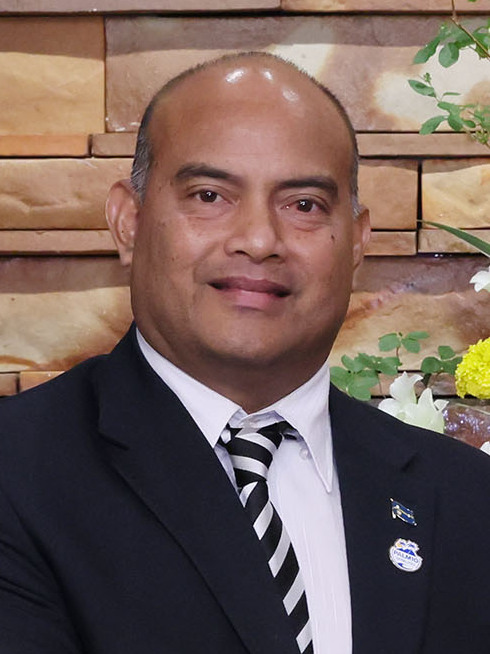
- Incumbent; David Adeang since 30 October 2023
- Executive branch of the Government of the Republic of Naoero; Cabinet of the Republic of Naoero; Office of the President of Naoero
- Style: His Excellency
- Residence: State House; Denigomodu District
- Nominator: Fellow member of Parliament or self nominated
- Appointer: Parliament
- Term length: Three years; renewable, can be removed by a majority of Parliament
- Constituting instrument: Constitution of Nauru (1968)
- Inaugural holder: Hammer DeRoburt
- Formation: 17 May 1968; 58 years ago
- Deputy: Minister Assisting the President
- Salary: AU$ 100,032/US$ 67,135 annually
- Website: www.nauru.gov.nr

The president of Nauru, officially the president of the Republic of Naoero, is elected by Parliament from among its members, and is both the head of state and the head of government of Nauru. Nauru's unicameral Parliament has 19 members, with an electoral term of three years. Political parties only play a minor role in Nauru politics, and there have often been periods of instability in the Presidential office. Shifting allegiances among a small number of individuals can lead to frequent changes in the makeup of the government, including who occupies the office of the president.

== Office of the President ==
The Office of the President of Nauru is the executive office that supports the President of Nauru in carrying out the duties of head of state and head of government. It coordinates government administration, cabinet affairs, national policy, official communications, and relations with foreign governments. The office also oversees ceremonial functions, executive decisions, and support staff working directly with the president. It is based at State House in the Denigomodu District. The current president is David Adeang.

=== Key Officials ===
The Office of the President of Nauru is headed by David Adeang, who serves as President, Chairman of the Cabinet, and head of government of Nauru. The office coordinates executive administration, cabinet operations, national policy, state protocol, and government communications.

Current senior officials and roles include:

Office	Incumbent
President of Nauru, Chairman of the Cabinet	David W. R. Adeang
Vice President, Minister Assisting the President	Lionel Aingimea
Director General	Christiana Detenamo
Principal Secretary to the President	Sasikumar Paranavoor
National Security Coordinator, National Security Advisor to the President	Shonadeen Adeang
Senior Personal Assistant to the President	Gronicia Harris
Senior Personal Assistant to the President	Carrina Hiram
Director of the Government Information Office	Joanna Olsson
Secretary to Cabinet	Ophelia Caleb
Human Rights Advisor to the President	Barina Waqa
Director of Finance and Administration	Kiara Ageidu
Auditor General	Manhoran Nair
Administrative Officer	Daisy-May Detsiogo

== List of officeholders ==
Political parties

Independent
Nauru Party (NP)
Democratic Party of Nauru (DPN)
Centre Party (CP)

No.	Portrait	Name (Birth–Death)	Term of office			Political party	Elected	Cabinet(s)	Ref.
No.	Portrait	Name (Birth–Death)	Took office	Left office	Time in office	Political party	Elected	Cabinet(s)	Ref.
1		Hammer DeRoburt (1922–1992)	17 May 1968	22 December 1976	8 years, 219 days	Independent	1968	DeRoburt I	
1		Hammer DeRoburt (1922–1992)	17 May 1968	22 December 1976	8 years, 219 days	Independent	1973	DeRoburt II	
2		Bernard Dowiyogo (1946–2003)	22 December 1976	19 April 1978	1 year, 118 days	NP	1976	Dowiyogo I	
2		Bernard Dowiyogo (1946–2003)	22 December 1976	19 April 1978	1 year, 118 days	NP	1977	Dowiyogo II	
3		Lagumot Harris (1938–1999)	19 April 1978	15 May 1978	26 days	Independent	—	Harris I	
(1)		Hammer DeRoburt (1922–1992)	15 May 1978	17 September 1986	8 years, 125 days	Independent	—	DeRoburt III	
(1)		Hammer DeRoburt (1922–1992)	15 May 1978	17 September 1986	8 years, 125 days	Independent	1980	DeRoburt IV	
(1)		Hammer DeRoburt (1922–1992)	15 May 1978	17 September 1986	8 years, 125 days	Independent	1983	DeRoburt V	
4		Kennan Adeang (1942–2011)	17 September 1986	1 October 1986	14 days	NP	—	Adeang I	
(1)		Hammer DeRoburt (1922–1992)	1 October 1986	12 December 1986	72 days	Independent	—	DeRoburt VI	
(4)		Kennan Adeang (1942–2011)	12 December 1986	22 December 1986	10 days	NP	—	Adeang II	
(1)		Hammer DeRoburt (1922–1992)	22 December 1986	17 August 1989	2 years, 238 days	Independent	1986	DeRoburt VII	
(1)		Hammer DeRoburt (1922–1992)	22 December 1986	17 August 1989	2 years, 238 days	Independent	1987	DeRoburt VII	
5		Kenas Aroi (1942–1991)	17 August 1989	12 December 1989	117 days	Independent	—	Aroi	
6		Bernard Dowiyogo (1946–2003)	12 December 1989	22 November 1995	5 years, 345 days	DPN	1989		
6		Bernard Dowiyogo (1946–2003)	12 December 1989	22 November 1995	5 years, 345 days	DPN	1992		
(3)		Lagumot Harris (1938–1999)	22 November 1995	11 November 1996	355 days	Independent	1995	Harris II	
(6)		Bernard Dowiyogo (1946–2003)	11 November 1996	26 November 1996	15 days	DPN	—		
(4)		Kennan Adeang (1942–2011)	26 November 1996	19 December 1996	23 days	DPN	—	Adeang III	
7		Ruben Kun (1942–2014)	19 December 1996	13 February 1997	56 days	Independent	—	Kun	
8		Kinza Clodumar (1945–2021)	13 February 1997	18 June 1998	1 year, 125 days	CP	1997	Clodumar	
(6)		Bernard Dowiyogo (1946–2003)	18 June 1998	27 April 1999	313 days	DPN	—		
9		René Harris (1947–2008)	27 April 1999	20 April 2000	359 days	Independent	—		
(6)		Bernard Dowiyogo (1946–2003)	20 April 2000	30 March 2001	344 days	DPN	2000		
(9)		René Harris (1947–2008)	30 March 2001	9 January 2003	1 year, 285 days	Independent	—		
(6)		Bernard Dowiyogo (1946–2003)	9 January 2003	17 January 2003	8 days	DPN	—		
(9)		René Harris (1947–2008)	17 January 2003	18 January 2003	1 day	Independent	—		
(6)		Bernard Dowiyogo (1946–2003)	18 January 2003	9 March 2003 #	50 days	DPN	—		
10		Derog Gioura (1932–2008)	10 March 2003	29 May 2003	80 days	Independent	—		
11		Ludwig Scotty (1948–2026)	29 May 2003	8 August 2003	71 days	Independent	2003		
(9)		René Harris (1947–2008)	8 August 2003	22 June 2004	319 days	Independent	—		
(11)		Ludwig Scotty (1948–2026)	22 June 2004	19 December 2007	3 years, 180 days	Independent	2004		
12		Marcus Stephen (born 1969)	19 December 2007	10 November 2011	3 years, 326 days	Independent	2007		
12		Marcus Stephen (born 1969)	19 December 2007	10 November 2011	3 years, 326 days	Independent	2008		
12		Marcus Stephen (born 1969)	19 December 2007	10 November 2011	3 years, 326 days	Independent	2010 (April)		
12		Marcus Stephen (born 1969)	19 December 2007	10 November 2011	3 years, 326 days	Independent	2010 (June)		
13		Freddie Pitcher (born 1967)	10 November 2011	15 November 2011	5 days	Independent	—	Kun	
14		Sprent Dabwido (1972–2019)	15 November 2011	11 June 2013	1 year, 208 days	Independent	—	Dabwido	
15		Baron Waqa (born 1959)	11 June 2013	27 August 2019	6 years, 77 days	Independent	2013	Waqa I	
15		Baron Waqa (born 1959)	11 June 2013	27 August 2019	6 years, 77 days	Independent	2016	Waqa I	
16		Lionel Aingimea (born 1965)	27 August 2019	29 September 2022	3 years, 33 days	Independent	2019	Aingimea	
17		Russ Kun (born 1975)	29 September 2022	30 October 2023	1 year, 31 days	Independent	2022	Kun	
18		David Adeang (born 1969)	30 October 2023	Incumbent	3 years, 18 days	Independent	2023	Adeang I	
18		David Adeang (born 1969)	30 October 2023	Incumbent	3 years, 18 days	Independent	2025	Adeang II	

== Vice President ==
The Vice President of Nauru is the second-highest government official and assists the president in running the country. The vice president may act on behalf of the president when necessary and helps oversee government administration. The position became more significant after recent constitutional reforms. The current vice president is Lionel Aingimea.

== See also ==
- List of colonial governors of Nauru
