= Aloysius Amwano =

Nauruan politician

The Honourable Aloysius Amwano MP

Member of the Nauruan Parliament for Ubenide
- In office 21 February 1998 – 6 November 2001
- Preceded by: Lagumot Harris
- Succeeded by: himself
- In office 18 December 2001 – 5 May 2003
- Preceded by: himself
- Succeeded by: Fabian Ribauw
- In office 26 April 2008 – 8 June 2013
- Preceded by: Fabian Ribauw
- Succeeded by: Ranin Akua

Speaker of the Parliament of Nauru
- In office 29 March 2001 – 30 March 2001
- Preceded by: Ludwig Scotty
- Succeeded by: Ludwig Scotty
- In office 2 July 2010 – July 2010
- Preceded by: Dominic Tabuna
- Succeeded by: Landon Deireragea

Personal details
- Born: 21 June 1955 (age 71) Nauru
- Spouse: Romina En-Kor Shine Amwano
- Children: Rebecca Amwano, Caruso Amwano, Oprey Amwano, Alina Amwano, Ursula Amwano, Alvin Amwano, Damien-Prem Amwano, Lawrence Amwano
- Occupation: Australian High Commission Project Manager

Aloysius Arabao Iyomogo Edrick Amwano (also called Ali Amwano; born 21 June 1955) is a Nauruan politician.

== Successive reversals of electoral fortune ==
Amwano started his parliamentary career in 1998, when he won a vacated seat in a by-election for the Ubenide Constituency following the resignation of former president Lagumot Harris.

=== 2000, 2001 & 2003 polls ===
In the 2000 general elections he was re-elected; during a political crisis in 2001 all four Ubenide members lost their seats in parliament, but along with two colleagues Amwano subsequently regained the seat in the following by-election. He was the Speaker of the Parliament of Nauru from 29 March 2001 to 30 March 2001. He served as Minister of Finance in the cabinets of René Harris between 2001 and 2003. After the 2003 general elections he lost his seat to Fabian Ribauw.

=== 2008 & 2010 elections ===
In 2008 he was re-elected to parliament, ousting Ribauw. He became part of President Marcus Stephen's parliamentary majority, before switching over to the opposition in 2010. He was one of three non-Cabinet government MPs to switch to the opposition after benefiting from a trip to Singapore organised and paid for by the Australian company Getax, which buys Nauruan phosphate. Getax had just sought, unsuccessfully, to propose a loan to the Stephen government, with contractual clauses enabling it (the company) to take over Nauru's phosphate industry in the event that the government defaulted in repaying. Following the Getax-funded trip, Amwano and two other MPs withdrew their support for the government, joining the opposition and causing Parliament to be evenly split between government and opposition MPs. This resulted in fresh parliamentary elections in April 2010, in which Amwano retained his seat. On 30 June 2010, he was elected Speaker, and demanded that Stephen stand down as president. On 6 July, opposition MP Rykers Solomon joined the government, potentially giving it the numbers to re-elect Stephen, or to elect a new president from within its ranks. As Speaker, however, Amwano refused to allow the election for president (by MPs) to be held. Amwano was dismissed by Stephen the following day, but refused to relinquish his post. In a short parliamentary session held on 9 July, Deputy Speaker Landon Deireragea announced that he had assumed the Speaker's position in Amwano's place.

In October, the Nauruan government accused Getax of having paid significant sums of money to opposition MPs, and of having funded the opposition's election campaign. The Australian Federal Police investigated the allegations that Getax had bribed Nauruan MPs "to influence the political regime in Nauru in order to increase their stake in the country's phosphate". Amwano spoke up to defend Getax, denying any wrongdoing and adding that he "would be happy for the Australian Federal Police to investigate".

== 2013 Election ==
Amwano was defeated in the 2013 elections, and was replaced by Ranin Akua.

== See also ==
- Politics of Nauru
- Elections in Nauru
- 2008 Nauruan parliamentary election
- April 2010 Nauruan parliamentary election
