= Itubwa Amram =

Nauruan politician

The Honourable Itubwa Amram MP

Speaker of the Parliament of Nauru
- In office 1968 – January 1971
- Preceded by: position established
- Succeeded by: Kenas Aroi

Member of the Nauruan Parliament for Aiwo
- In office 31 January 1968 – 25 January 1971
- Preceded by: position established
- Succeeded by: Kinza Clodumar

Personal details
- Born: 21 December 1922 Nauru
- Died: 17 July 1989 (aged 66) Nauru

The Reverend Alfred Itubwa Amram (21 December 1922 – 17 July 1989) was a Nauruan pastor and political figure.

== Professional roles ==
=== Political role ===
He was a member of the first parliament of the Republic of Nauru. He was the Speaker of the Parliament of Nauru from 1968 to January 1971.

Standing for Aiwo Constituency, Amram was elected to parliament in early 1968 just before the country's independence. Four years later he lost his seat to Kinza Clodumar.

=== Pastoral role ===
Amram was the first Nauruan-born ordained minister, with all preceding ministers coming from abroad. Amram was trained in Australia. He later served as head of the Nauruan Protestant Church.

== Personal life ==
Amram was a member of the Iruwa tribe.

== Death ==
Amram died on 17 July 1989, at age 66.

== See also ==
- Politics of Nauru
- Elections in Nauru
