= Sean Oppenheimer =

Nauruan politician (born 1967)

The Honourable Sean Oppenheimer MP
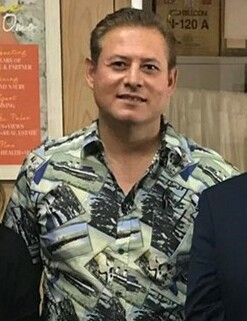
- Oppenheimer in 2019

Member of the Nauruan Parliament for Anetan
- In office 9 July 2016 – 27 August 2019

Personal details
- Born: 7 October 1967 (age 58) Melbourne, Australia
- Party: Independent

Sean Oppenheimer (born 7 October 1967) is a Nauruan politician and businessman who was a Member of Parliament for Anetan from 9 July 2016 to 27 August 2019. He was a member of the Opposition. Oppenheimer is the owner of the retail store Capelle & Partner.

== Career ==
Oppenheimer was elected in the July 2016 elections to the Parliament of Nauru, representing the constituency of Anetan. He was not invited to form part of the government and so joined Riddel Akua and Kieren Keke as a default member of the 3 member opposition. He served in a number of official capacities over the years:

- Vice Chairman Nauru Fisheries, 1997–1998
- President Nauru Boxing Federation, 2008–Present
- Nauru Olympic Committee Executive Member, 2009–2013
- Nauru Olympic Committee Vice President, 2013–Present
- Oceania Boxing Confederation Executive Board Member, 2013–Present
- Honorary Consul for Israel to Nauru, 2011–2016

He did not run for reelection in 2019.

Oppenheimer runs the largest private business in Nauru, Capelle & Partner, which has more than 150 employees. It was founded by Oppenheimer's parents in 1965. It has several different business lines including the largest retail store in the country with supermarket and hardware provisions as well as accommodation, car rental and boat chartering services.

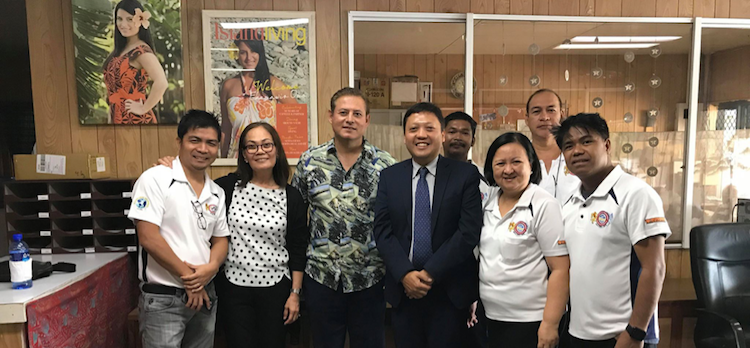
Oppenheimer (third from left) with the Philippine Consul General (in suit)

== Personal life ==
Sean Oppenheimer is married and has 5 children. As a child he attended Yaren Primary School, Aiwo Primary School, Nauru High School and Caulfield Grammar School in Melbourne.

His father, Desmond Oppenheimer, was born in Ireland and migrated to Australia as a child. His mother, Sophie Oppenheimer, is a native Nauruan. Oppenheimer's maternal granduncle, Hammer DeRoburt was the first president of Nauru when the country became independent in 1968. His paternal side is of Jewish descent.

== See also ==
- Politics of Nauru

Political offices	Incumbent
