= List of speakers of the Parliament of Nauru =

Speaker of the Parliament of Nauru

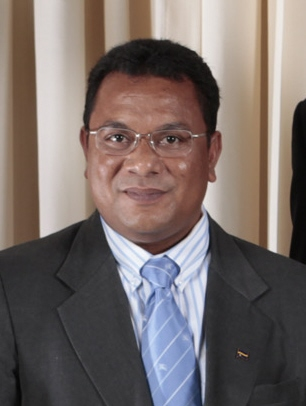
- Incumbent; Marcus Stephen since 27 August 2019
- Parliament of Nauru
- Appointer: Parliament of Nauru
- Inaugural holder: Itubwa Amram
- Formation: Constitution of Nauru
- Deputy: Deputy Speaker of Parliament
- Salary: $89,315 (AUD) annually
- Website: naurugov.nr

The Speaker of the Parliament of Nauru, officially the Speaker of the Parliament of Naoero, is the presiding officer of that legislature in the Republic of Nauru. The Speaker is elected by the members in the Parliament of Nauru.

A list of the office holders follows.

== List ==
Name	Took office	Left office	Notes
Itubwa Amram	1968	January 1971	
Kenas Aroi	January 1971	January 1977	
Samuel Tsitsi	January 1977	April 1977	
David Peter Gadaraoa	April 1977	August 1981	
Ruben Kun	August 1981	12 December 1986	
René Harris	December 1986	December 1986	
Kinza Clodumar	December 1986	December 1986	
Pres Nimes Ekwona	22 December 1986	18 September 1987	
Derog Gioura	18 September 1987	17 November 1992	
Paul Denebaua Jeremiah	18 November 1992	21 November 1995	
Maein Deireragea	21 November 1995	12 February 1997	
Kennan Adeang	12 February 1997	12 December 1998	
Ludwig Keke	12 December 1998	12 April 2000	
Ludwig Scotty	13 April 2000	29 March 2001	
Aloysius Amwano	29 March 2001	30 March 2001	
Ludwig Scotty	25 May 2001	19 December 2002	
Vassal Gadoengin	December 2002	20 January 2003	
Ross Cain	13 March 2003	6 May 2003	
Godfrey Thoma	6 May 2003	7 May 2003	
Fabian Ribauw	29 May 2003	8 August 2003	
Nimrod Botelanga	8 August 2003	24 February 2004	
Ludwig Scotty	24 February 2004	6 April 2004	
Terangi Adam	6 April 2004	29 April 2004 - ?	acting
David Adeang	May 2004	22 June 2004	
Riddell Akua	June 2004	15 July 2004	
Russell Kun	15 July 2004	26 October 2004	Unseated in 2004 election.
Vassal Gadoengin	26 October 2004	15 December 2004	Died in office.
Valdon Dowiyogo	27 December 2004	December 2007	
Riddell Akua	December 2007	18 March 2008	resigned
David Adeang	20 March 2008	18 April 2008	removed from office
Riddell Akua	29 April 2008	13 March 2010	resigned
Dominic Tabuna	13 March 2010	27 April 2010	acting
Shadlog Bernicke	27 April 2010	13 May 2010	
Godfrey Thoma	13 May 2010	18 May 2010	resigned
Dominic Tabuna	1 June 2010	4 June 2010	resigned
Aloysius Amwano	2 July 2010	July 2010	removed from office
Landon Deireragea	9 July 2010	1 November 2010	acting
Ludwig Scotty	1 November 2010	18 April 2013	resigned
Landon Deireragea	18 April 2013	25 April 2013	acting
Godfrey Thoma	25 April 2013	28 May 2013	lost seat after 2013 elections.
Ludwig Scotty	11 June 2013	July 2016	lost seat after 2016 elections.
Cyril Buraman	13 July 2016	August 2019	lost seat after 2019 elections
Marcus Stephen	27 August 2019	Incumbent	
