= Valdon Dowiyogo =

Nauruan politician

The Honourable Valdon Dowiyogo MP
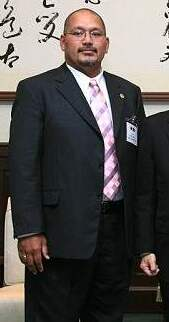
- Dowiyogo in 2007

Member of the Nauruan Parliament for Ubenide
- In office 2003 – 8 December 2016
- Preceded by: Derog Gioura
- Succeeded by: Gabrissa Hartman

Speaker of the Parliament of Nauru
- In office 27 December 2004 – December 2007
- Preceded by: Vassal Gadoengin
- Succeeded by: Riddell Akua

Personal details
- Born: Valdon Kape Dowiyogo; 31 August 1968 Nauru
- Died: 8 December 2016 (aged 48) Russia
- Parent: Bernard Dowiyogo (father)

Valdon Kape Dowiyogo (31 August 1968 – 8 December 2016) was a political figure and cabinet minister from the Pacific nation of the Republic of Nauru.

== Family and political background ==
His father, Bernard Dowiyogo, served as President of Nauru on seven occasions between 1976 and 2003. His brother, Jesaulenko Dowiyogo, is also pursuing a political career.

Valdon Dowiyogo was elected to the Parliament of Nauru for the constituency of Ubenide.

== Speaker of the Parliament of Nauru ==
On 27 December 2004 he was elected Speaker of the Parliament of Nauru after the death in office of his predecessor, Vassal Gadoengin. He served until December 2007.

== Member of the Cabinet ==
In 2013 Dowiyogo was appointed by President Baron Waqa to be a member of his Cabinet. Dowiyogo held the portfolios of Health, Transport, Sports, and Fisheries. Dowiyogo died on 8 December 2016 in Russia. He had been in declining health prior to his death.

== See also ==
- Politics of Nauru
- Political families of the world#Nauru
- Christine Dowiyogo
