= Riddell Akua =

Nauruan politician

The Honourable Riddell Akua MP

Member of the Nauruan Parliament for Anabar
- In office 2003–2019
- Preceded by: James Deireragea
- Succeeded by: Pyon Deiye

Speaker of the Parliament of Nauru
- In office June 2004 – 15 July 2004
- Preceded by: David Adeang
- Succeeded by: Russell Kun
- In office December 2007 – 18 March 2008
- Preceded by: Valdon Dowiyogo
- Succeeded by: David Adeang
- In office 29 April 2008 – 13 March 2010
- Preceded by: David Adeang
- Succeeded by: Dominic Tabuna

Personal details
- Born: 26 January 1963 (age 63) Nauru
- Party: Naoero Amo

Michael Riddell Akua (born 26 January 1963) is a Nauruan politician.

== Background ==
Akua has been a member of the Parliament of Nauru since 3 May 2003. From this date on he has also been an important part of the Nauru Phosphate Corporation.

He is a member of the Naoero Amo Party, and he was re-elected to parliament in 2004, 2007 and 2008.

Akua was defeated in his attempt at re-election in the 2019 election.

=== Speaker of the Parliament of Nauru ===
He was elected the Speaker of the Parliament of Nauru from June 2004 to July 2004. He was elected again Speaker in Parliament during the first three months of Marcus Stephen's presidency, from December 2007 to March 2008.

=== Resignation and coup d'état allegations ===
He resigned on March 18, to prevent the Opposition, led by David Adeang and former President Rene Harris (who died of ill health several weeks later), from submitting a motion of no confidence against Stephen.

He was replaced as Speaker by David Adeang.

Akua was seen as a close ally of President Marcus Stephen, whose government ceased to command the support of a majority in the Parliament of Nauru in March 2008. Akua's resignation was thus set in the context of strengthening the Executive by hindering the conduct of Parliamentary business, which, as widely acknowledged, would likely have led to the term of office of the Stephen Administration being ended by Parliament. In this sense, Akua's record as Parliamentary Speaker is seen as controversial and allegations of a coup d'état made by Akua's successor as Speaker, David Adeang, may be seen against this light.

=== Reappointment as Speaker ===
Following the elections of April 26, 2008, Akua was again elected to the Parliament of Nauru and appointed once more to the post of Speaker. He entered office on 29 April 2008. He resigned on 13 March 2010.

== See also ==
- Politics of Nauru
- 2008 Nauruan parliamentary election
- Parliament of Nauru#Current MPs
