= Dominic Tabuna =

Naruan politician

The Honourable Dominic Tabuna MP
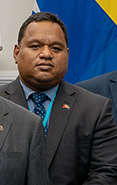
- Tabuna in 2023

Member of the Nauruan Parliament for Yaren
- In office 23 October 2004 – 8 June 2013
- Preceded by: Pres Ekwona
- Succeeded by: Charmaine Scotty

Speaker of the Parliament of Nauru
- In office 13 March 2010 – 27 April 2010
- Preceded by: Riddell Akua
- Succeeded by: Shadlog Bernicke
- In office 1 June 2010 – 4 June 2010
- Preceded by: Godfrey Thoma
- Succeeded by: Aloysius Amwano

Personal details
- Born: 9 August 1980 (age 45) Nauru

Dominic Joselito Tabuna (born 9 August 1980) is a Nauruan politician.

== Earlier political career ==
Tabuna was elected to parliament in the 2004 general elections, gaining the seat of Pres Ekwona.

He has been subsequently re-elected in 2007 and 2008. Tabuna was defeated for re-election in 2013.

== Speaker of Parliament ==
He served as the Deputy Speaker of the Parliament of Nauru and represented the Yaren Constituency in the Parliament of Nauru, and was Speaker of the Parliament of Nauru from 1 to 4 June 2010.

== See also ==
- Politics of Nauru
- Elections in Nauru
- 2008 Nauruan parliamentary election
