= Shadlog Bernicke =

Nauruan politician (born 1966)

The Honourable Shadlog Bernicke MP
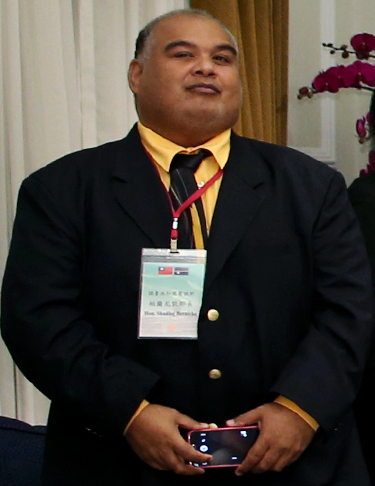
- Bernicke in 2016

Member of the Nauruan Parliament for Buada
- Incumbent
- Assumed office 26 August 2007
- Preceded by: Terangi Adam

Speaker of the Parliament of Nauru
- In office 27 April 2010 – 13 May 2010
- Preceded by: Dominic Tabuna
- Succeeded by: Godfrey Thoma

Personal details
- Born: 8 July 1966 (age 59) Nauru

Shadlog Armait Bernicke (born on 8 July 1966) is a Nauruan politician representing the Buada constituency in the Parliament of Nauru.

== Political career ==
Bernicke was first elected to the Parliament in the 2007 general elections, where he succeeded Terangi Adam in representing the Buada constituency. He was re-elected in subsequent elections.

=== Parliamentary Roles ===
Bernicke briefly served as the Speaker of the Parliament of Nauru from 27 April 2010 until 13 May 2010, just before the general elections.

=== Ministerial Roles ===
- Waqa Cabinet: Under President Baron Waqa, he served as Minister for the Nauru Phosphate Royalties Trust, Minister for the Nauru Utilities Corporation, and Minister of Telecommunications. In August 2018, Bernicke was removed from his ministerial position by President Baron Waqa, although the reasons for this decision were not publicly disclosed.
- Adeang Cabinet: Following President David Adeang’s swearing-in on 31 October 2023, Bernicke was appointed Minister for Media, Information and Communication Technology, RONPhos, Cenpac, and the Nauru Phosphate Royalties Trust.

=== Family background ===
Bernicke is the grandson of Austin Bernicke, who was a member of Nauru's first Parliament in 1968.

== See also ==
- Politics of Nauru
- Elections in Nauru
- 2008 Nauruan parliamentary election
