= Godfrey Thoma =

Nauruan politician

The Honourable Godfrey Thoma MP

Speaker of the Parliament of Nauru
- In office 25 April 2013 – 11 June 2013
- Preceded by: Landon Deireragea
- Succeeded by: Ludwig Scotty
- In office 13 May 2010 – 18 May 2010
- Preceded by: Shadlog Bernicke
- Succeeded by: Dominic Tabuna
- In office 6 May 2003 – 7 May 2003
- Preceded by: Ross Cain
- Succeeded by: Fabian Ribauw

Personal details
- Born: 22 January 1957 (age 69) Nauru
- Profession: police officer

Godfrey Awaire Thoma (born 22 January 1957) is a Nauruan politician and police officer.

== Member of Parliament ==
Thoma started his first term in the parliament after being elected in 1995, ousting Theodore Moses after only three years. He had been subsequently re-elected to parliament until 2007, when he lost his seat to Dantes Tsitsi.

=== Second term ===
Following the parliament's dissolution in 2008 after President Marcus Stephen had declared a state of emergency, Thoma was re-elected to parliament to serve a second term for the Aiwo Constituency, ending the 31-year parliamentary term of former president René Harris who died just two months later.

He retained his seat in the 2010 parliamentary election.

Thoma was defeated in the 2013 election.

== Minister of Justice and Speaker of the Parliament of Nauru ==
Thoma served as Minister of Justice in the administrations of René Harris and Ludwig Scotty.

In May 2003 he was elected Speaker of Parliament, but resigned just one day later. Following the 2010 parliamentary election, he was again elected Speaker. Elected on 13 May, he resigned on 18 May, to prevent President Marcus Stephen from forming a government. Thoma was elected as speaker for a third time on 25 April 2013 after the previous speaker, Ludwig Scotty resigned after a period of parliamentary deadlock and tension between the government and the opposition.

== See also ==
- Politics of Nauru
- Elections in Nauru
- 2008 Nauruan parliamentary election
- Parliament of Nauru#Current MPs
- List of speakers of the Parliament of Nauru

== Sources ==
- https://web.archive.org/web/20130926022811/http://islandsbusiness.com/2013/5/pacific-update/nauru-elections-in-possible-delay/
