= Vassal Gadoengin =

Nauruan politician

The Honourable Vassal Gadoengin MP

Member of the Nauruan Parliament for Anetan
- In office 10 February 1997 – 5 May 2003
- Preceded by: Ruby Dediya
- Succeeded by: Marcus Stephen
- In office 23 February 2004 – 15 December 2004
- Preceded by: Remy Namaduk
- Succeeded by: Cyril Buramen

Speaker of the Parliament of Nauru
- In office December 2002 – January 2003
- Preceded by: Ludwig Scotty
- Succeeded by: Ross Cain
- In office 26 October 2004 – 15 December 2004
- Preceded by: Russell Kun
- Succeeded by: Valdon Dowiyogo

Personal details
- Born: 1 May 1943 Nauru
- Died: 15 December 2004 (aged 61) Nauru

Vassal Abago Bagobagan Gadoengin (1 May 1943 – 15 December 2004) was a political figure from the Pacific nation of Nauru.

== Background ==
Vassal attended school in the United States. He attended Skagit Valley College, Mt. Vernon, Wa., in the late 1960s. He continued his education in Portland, Oregon in the early 1970s.

Before entering a political career, which he did not do until he was into his mid-50s, Gadoengin had been working as a teacher.

== Political roles ==
Gadoengin was elected to parliament in 1997, winning the seat of Ruby Dediya and was re-elected in 2000. He served as Minister of Finance in the cabinet of Bernard Dowiyogo in March 2001. In 2003 he lost his seat to newcomer Marcus Stephen, but regained it after the 2004 snap elections.

=== Speaker of the Parliament of Nauru ===
He was elected Speaker of the Parliament of Nauru twice: from December 2002 to January 2003, and again on 26 October 2004. He was serving in this office when he died on 15 December 2004. Gadoengin was succeeded as Speaker by Valdon Dowiyogo.

== See also ==
- Politics of Nauru
