= Fabian Ribauw =

Nauruan politician

The Honourable Fabian Ribauw MP

Member of the Nauruan Parliament for Ubenide
- In office May 5, 2003 – April 26, 2008
- Preceded by: Aloysius Amwano
- Succeeded by: Aloysius Amwano

Speaker of the Parliament of Nauru
- In office 29 May 2003 – 8 August 2003
- Preceded by: Godfrey Thoma
- Succeeded by: Nimrod Botelanga

Personal details
- Born: 18 January 1971 (age 55) Baitsi, Nauru
- Education: La Trobe University, Melbourne

Fabian Dominic Ribauw (born January 18, 1971) is a politician from the Pacific island nation of Nauru.

== Background and political role ==
Ribauw was born in Baitsi. He studied in Australia and earned a BA in Economics from La Trobe University, Melbourne.

Ribauw served a period as a Member of the Parliament of Nauru. He was the Speaker of the Parliament of Nauru from 29 May 2003 to 8 August 2003.

== Loss of Parliamentary seat ==
In the elections held in April 2008, Ribauw lost his seat in the Parliament of Nauru.

== See also ==
- Politics of Nauru
- 2008 Nauruan parliamentary election
