= Marcus Stephen =

President of Nauru from 2007 to 2011

His Excellency Marcus Stephen MP
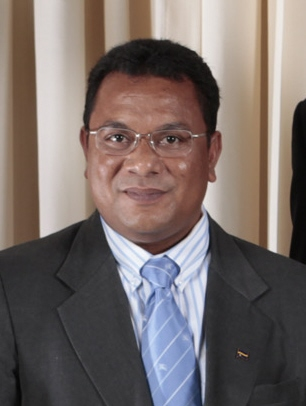
- Stephen in 2009

President of Nauru
- In office 19 December 2007 – 10 November 2011
- Deputy: Kieren Keke
- Preceded by: Ludwig Scotty
- Succeeded by: Freddie Pitcher

Speaker of Parliament
- Incumbent
- Assumed office 27 August 2019
- Preceded by: Cyril Buraman

Member of the Nauruan Parliament for Anetan
- Incumbent
- Assumed office 27 August 2019
- Preceded by: Cyril Buraman
- In office 3 May 2003 – 13 July 2016
- Preceded by: Vassal Gadoengin
- Succeeded by: Sean Oppenheimer

Personal details
- Born: 1 October 1969 (age 57) Nauru
- Party: Independent

Marcus Ajemada Stephen (born 1 October 1969) is a Nauruan politician and former sportsperson who previously was a member of the Cabinet of Nauru, and who served as President of Nauru from December 2007 to November 2011. The son of Nauruan parliamentarian Lawrence Stephen, Stephen was educated at St Bedes College and RMIT University in Victoria, Australia. Initially playing Australian rules football, he opted to pursue the sport of weightlifting, in which he represented Nauru at the Summer Olympics and Commonwealth Games between 1990 and 2002, winning seven Commonwealth gold medals.

After his retirement from weightlifting, Stephen worked at the Bank of Nauru before being elected to parliament at the 2003 elections. Having occupied various portfolios in the Nauruan government under President René Harris, Stephen was sworn in as president after moving a no confidence motion against his predecessor, Ludwig Scotty. His term as president was marked by allegations of corruption and accusations of a coup d'état, as well as the declaration of a state of emergency and a suspension from parliament by the Nauruan Supreme Court in 2008. Two separate elections were called in April and June 2010 after accusations of bribery of government members of parliament, with another state of emergency declared in the period between elections. Stephen resigned from the presidency in November 2011 after further allegations of corruption were raised by opposition factions, and was succeeded by Freddie Pitcher, but was re-appointed to the Cabinet in June 2012 by Pitcher's successor as president, Sprent Dabwido. On 27 August 2019, Stephen was elected as the new Speaker of Parliament during its inaugural session.

== Family background ==
Marcus Stephen's father, Lawrence Stephen, served as a Member of the Parliament of Nauru from 1971 to 1977 and again from 1980 to 1986. He is related to the prominent Keke family of Nauru.

== Education and background ==
Stephen received his high School education in Australia, attending St Bede's College, Melbourne. He has a Diploma in Business Accounting from the Royal Melbourne Institute of Technology. From 2001 to 2003 he was employed in management at The Bank of Nauru.

== Sporting career ==
Marcus Stephen
Medal record

Weightlifting

Representing Nauru

Commonwealth Games
Gold medal – first place	1990 Auckland	60 kg snatch
Gold medal – first place	1994 Victoria	59 kg snatch
Gold medal – first place	1994 Victoria	59 kg clean & jerk
Gold medal – first place	1994 Victoria	59 kg combined
Gold medal – first place	1998 Kuala Lumpur	62 kg snatch
Gold medal – first place	1998 Kuala Lumpur	62 kg clean & jerk
Gold medal – first place	1998 Kuala Lumpur	62 kg combined
Silver medal – second place	1990 Auckland	60 kg clean & jerk
Silver medal – second place	1990 Auckland	60 kg combined
Silver medal – second place	2002 Manchester	62 kg snatch
Silver medal – second place	2002 Manchester	62 kg clean & jerk
Silver medal – second place	2002 Manchester	62 kg combined

World Championship
Silver medal – second place	1999 Athens	62 kg clean & jerk

He initially played Australian rules football for the local team the Aces, but opted to pursue the sport of weightlifting. In 1989 the Nauru Weightlifting Federation (NWF) was founded, primarily to give Stephen, the sole top-class weightlifter in Nauru at the time, the opportunity to compete internationally.

In 1992 he took part in his first Olympic Games in Barcelona. Since Nauru had no Olympic Committee at the time, he successfully applied for Samoan citizenship and was allowed to compete for Samoa. In 1993 the committee was founded and Stephen was able to represent Nauru in the 1996 Summer Olympics in Atlanta and the 2000 Summer Olympics in Sydney.

When the Olympic torch was carried to Sydney in 2000, Stephen had the honour of being a torch bearer during its stopover in Nauru.

It was at the Commonwealth Games where most of his successes came: In the 1990 Commonwealth Games he surprisingly won a gold medal in the Snatch in the 60 kg class. In the 1994 Commonwealth Games he won three gold medals in the 59 kg class and in the 1998 Commonwealth Games in the 62 kg class he collected three more golds. In his last Games, the 2002 Commonwealth Games in Manchester he won three silvers in the 62 kg class.

At the 1999 World Championship in Athens, he was runner up in the clean and jerk in the 62 kg class.

In 2005 he was elected member of the International Weightlifting Federation Hall of Fame.

In March 2008, it was reported that Stephen had been appointed to the presidency of the Oceania Weightlifting Federation, the Pacific region's official continental weightlifting body.

In January 2009, he was elected president of the Nauru National Olympic Committee, defeating Vinson Detenamo, who had been president of the committee since its recognition by the International Olympic Committee in 1994.

== Political career ==
Since 1997 he has been the Treasurer of the Nauruan Olympic Committee. On 3 May 2003 Stephen was elected to the Nauru parliament with a score of just over 215 points, achieving first place in the Ewa and Anetan Constituency.

During the presidency of René Harris, Stephen was and Minister of Finance and of Education from August 2003 until July 2004, a post he had to relinquish when Ludwig Scotty became the new president. In October 2004 he was re-elected to parliament. Following his re election in October 2004 into the Parliament of Nauru, Stephen was appointed as Minister for Nauru Phosphate Royalties Trust; During his first term, due to the nature of a Small Island Developing State (SIDS) such as Nauru, with a political system relying on independent politicians, Stephen synergised several ministry posts including Minister for Economic Development & Industry; Minister responsible for Good Governance; Minister for Justice; Police & Prisons and Internal Affairs. Between November 2004 and May 2006 Stephen held Chairmanship of the Nauru Fisheries & Marine Resources Authority later becoming Minister for Nauru Fisheries & Marine Resources on 13 November 2007.

After Nauru joined the International Whaling Commission (IWC) on 15 June 2005, Stephen was nominated as a delegate for Nauru. He represented Nauru at the IWC-Congress in June 2005 in the South Korean city of Ulsan.

Stephen was re-elected to parliament in the August 2007 parliamentary election. He unsuccessfully stood as a presidential candidate in the vote held in parliament on 28 August, in which Scotty was re-elected.

However, following a successful vote of no confidence in Parliament against President Scotty on 19 December 2007, Marcus Stephen was sworn in as President of Nauru.

=== President of Nauru ===
==== 2007 ====
In the initial period of his Administration, Stephen moved to continue the practice, commenced by former President Ludwig Scotty, of appointing a separate Foreign Affairs Minister, when Dr. Kieren Keke (a cousin of Stephen) was installed in that post in December 2007. Previously, each President of Nauru had concurrently acted as his own Foreign Affairs Minister, although this was customary rather than a constitutional requirement. Stephen also appointed Frederick Pitcher as Finance Minister, and his Administration inherited the austerity measures associated with the outgoing Scotty Administration.

Regarding constitutional affairs, however, one of the major issues facing the new Stephen Administration was the process of constitutional revision consultations, started by former President Ludwig Scotty. These centred mainly on proposals to elect the President of Nauru by direct, popular election, rather than indirectly by the Parliament of Nauru, and which would thus restrict somewhat the frequent recourse to the vote of no confidence, which has been a feature of Nauru's political life for many years. Since Marcus Stephen came to office in circumstances involving the overturning of the previous government's Parliamentary majority in just such a manner, it remained to be seen what the Stephen Administration's formal position and practice on this issue would be.

At a personal level, the appointment of Marcus Stephen as President of Nauru at the age of 38, together with a youthful ministerial team, marked somewhat of a generational shift from some of the political figures who have dominated Nauruan politics in recent years; e.g., he was nearly 40 years younger than Derog Gioura, who served as President of Nauru in 2003, having entered the Parliament of Nauru in 1968, before the birth of Stephen. However, the appointment of youthful heads of state in the Republic of Nauru is by no means unknown; Bernard Dowiyogo assumed the office of President of Nauru at the even younger age of 30 in 1976. It may be added that since Stephen's presidency was to last a few years, his actual experience of office was to grow to be much longer than that of several previous holders of the same office.

==== Political turmoil ====
In March 2008 moves in the Parliament of Nauru to unseat the Administration of Marcus Stephen by means of a vote of no confidence were thwarted by the resignation of the Speaker, Riddell Akua. Unrest on the island which involved threats to export trade and the torching of a police station were events which occurred shortly prior to Parliamentary moves to remove President Stephen and his Administration from office.

At the end of the first three months of Stephen's presidency there was thus widespread unrest in the country.

===== Stephen and Speaker of Parliament accusations =====
On 22 March, the Speaker of the Parliament of Nauru, David Adeang, called a Parliamentary session, allegedly without informing government ministers, who therefore did not attend. Opposition MPs, Adeang included, constituted a majority of legislators present, and passed a ruling outlawing dual citizenship for Members of Parliament. The ruling, if applied, would have affected senior Cabinet ministers Dr. Kieren Keke and Frederick Pitcher. Had they been compelled to resign from Parliament, the Opposition would have controlled a majority of seats in Parliament. The government rejected the legitimacy of the ruling, stating that it was unconstitutional because of the lack of parliamentary quorum. President Marcus Stephen accused Adeang and the Opposition of passing the ruling "after dark on Easter Saturday", "under candelight". On 31 March, Adeang claimed that the Stephen Administration had mounted a coup d'état because the loyalty of the police to the rule of Parliamentary law was no longer present, after the police refused to eject Keke and Pitcher from the chamber of the Parliament.

===== Coup allegations =====
The Stephen Administration, in response, denied the claim of a coup d'état, stating that they were awaiting a ruling from the Supreme Court on the issue.

The crisis continued into early April 2008, with Adeang stating that he would consider the Supreme Court's ruling as "just an opinion", and Keke responding that the Supreme Court, not the Speaker, had the jurisdiction to determine a member of Parliament's eligibility.

===== Supreme Court ruling =====
A ruling by the Supreme Court in April 2008 that the Speaker of the Parliament of Nauru had erred in seeking to exclude from Parliament two key ministers, who also made up the Government's majority, was seen to have enhanced the constitutionality of the Stephen Administration's make up.

Relations between the Stephen Administration and Adeang remained under severe strain, however, and the Administration's ministers continued to exercise executive powers without the support of an absolute parliamentary majority.

===== Stephen suspended from Parliament =====
By 10 April, the tenuous connection between the rule of the Stephen Administration and the Parliament of Nauru was further diminished. President Stephen and the eight other members of the 18-member Parliament who supported his Administration were suspended from the Parliamentary sitting, amidst rowdy scenes, by the Speaker, David Adeang, who had difficulty in making himself heard when commenting on the recent Supreme Court decision regarding dual nationality for MPs.

===== State of emergency and 2nd Administration =====
On 18 April 2008, Stephen declared a state of emergency and called a snap election to end months of political deadlock. At the election held on 26 April 2008, Marcus Stephen's supporters gave his administration a majority in the Parliament of Nauru. Prior to 24 April 2008 general election the 18 members of the Parliament of Nauru became a Hung Parliament split 9:9, between the supporters of President Stephen and the Splinter group led by foreign minister David Adeang. In the snap parliamentary election which consisted of 5'017 voters across eight Constituencies and the 18 seats, the 9 pro government members held their seats while the anti Stephen members were reduced to 6, replaced by three newly elected MP's who sided with President Stephen. As a consequence Stephen was re-elected as President of Nauru after holding his Anetan Constituency seat.

===== Moves to expand private banking facilities =====
The Stephen Administration announced in November 2008 moves to expand private banking facilities in Nauru. These were mooted as being designed to confront commercial stagnation.

==== 2009 ====
The year 2009 opened with the Stephen Administration enjoying a more consolidated position than it had experienced in its first few months of existence. (See, above: Marcus Stephen#Political turmoil.)

==== 2010: Political turmoil and State of Emergency ====
In late 2009 or early 2010, the Stephen Cabinet rejected a proposed loan from Australian company Getax, which buys Nauruan phosphate. Getax offered Nauru a loan of A$25 million, with a 15% interest rate, which, according to a later investigation by newspaper The Australian, "would be likely to have resulted in the country defaulting on its repayments, triggering contract provisions that would have let Getax take over the Nauru-owned phosphate industry". The government refused the offer, Stephen later explaining: "It would have been disastrous for Nauru. It we had defaulted on one payment, we would have lost the phosphate industry. Cabinet unanimously rejected it."

Shortly thereafter, Getax organised and funded a trip to Singapore for all six opposition MPs, as well as three non-Cabinet government MPs. Following the trip, the latter three defected to the opposition, and the Stephen government's parliamentary majority shrank from twelve-six to nine-all, leaving Parliament deadlocked. Following "repeated unsuccessful bids by the opposition to lodge motions of no confidence in the government of Marcus Stephen", early elections were held in April 2010. They resulted in all sitting MPs being re-elected, prompting fresh, equally inconclusive elections in June.

Following opposition attempts to prevent a presidential election by MPs, Stephen declared a state of emergency. The government officially reported that it was continuing its functions in a transitory capacity, in accordance with articles 16 and 20 of the Constitution, until a President could be elected by a majority in Parliament. Article 16.4 states that the President will remain at his post until a new president is elected, while article 20 states that Cabinet members' mandates end when a new president is elected. The opposition challenged the state of emergency, a challenge which was thrown out by the Supreme Court in October, on the grounds that it is the President's constitutional prerogative to determine whether a state of emergency exists.

A few days later, after "Australian officials ha[d] confidentially expressed concern to the government of Nauru over Getax's alleged role in the destabilisation" of the country, Stephen's government asked Australia to investigate "the activities of Getax and any financial ties it may have with politicians in Nauru", namely members of the opposition. Stephen, and Justice Minister Mathew Batsiua, asked for an Australian investigation into money allegedly paid by Gatex to members of the opposition, which they suggested might constitute bribes. Nauru's Director of Public Prosecutions stated there had been "attempts to bring about a change of government by bribery of members of parliament", and Stephen released documents "showing opposition members on salaries of less than $150 a week spending significant sums of cash on boats, cars, voters and trips". The allegations were that Gatex had bribed opposition members, both through personal donations and by financing their election campaigns, in the hopes that the opposition would win power and sign the deal enabling the loan which the Stephen administration had rejected. The allegation was also that Getax had bribed non-Cabinet government MPs in an attempt to undermine Stephen's parliamentary majority and bring down his government, and that these actions had resulted in the early 2010 parliamentary deadlock, the 2010 elections and the accompanying political crisis. Nauru's Commissioner of Police "lacked the resources to mount an investigation that would span Singapore, Australia and Nauru"; hence Nauru's request to Australia. In response to the request, the Australian Federal Police began an investigation into the allegation that Getax had bribed Nauruan opposition MPs.

A few days after that, Ludwig Scotty accepted the position of Speaker in Parliament, enabling a presidential election to take place. Marcus Stephen was duly re-elected President, with a workable parliamentary majority, defeating Milton Dube by eleven votes to six. The state of emergency was consequently lifted. Scotty explained that he remained a member of the Opposition, but that he had accepted the position of Speaker so that Parliament could function (giving the Opposition a say in government), and so that a budget could be adopted. He explained that his decision was also due to the allegations over Opposition members receiving financial support from Getax.

== Post-presidency ==
On 10 November 2011, President Marcus Stephen resigned from the presidency amid corruption allegations levelled by the Nauruan opposition. Opposition MPs accused Stephen of seeking to illegally profit from a phosphate deal. Stephen called the charges "unwarranted and mischievous." He resigned the presidency, but remained in parliament. He was succeeded by one of his allies, Freddie Pitcher, who was removed five days later, and replaced by Sprent Dabwido. Stephen remained in opposition until June 2012, when he was given the portfolios of Commerce, Industry & Environment, Nauru Phosphate Royalties Trust, and Fisheries in Dabwido's new Cabinet.

Stephen contested his Anetan Constituency during the 2016 Nauruan parliamentary election but lost his seat in Parliament.

He ran successfully in the 2019 Nauruan parliamentary election and re-entered Parliament as one of two Members representing the Anetan Constituency. On 27 August 2019, Stephen was elected as the new Parliament Speaker defeating rival Shadlog Bernicke by 12 votes to 7.

Stephen was returned as Speaker unopposed after the 2022 Nauruan parliamentary election.

== See also ==
- Politics of Nauru
- Political families of the world#Nauru
- 2008 Nauruan parliamentary election

Political offices
Preceded by Ludwig Scotty	President of Nauru; 2007–2011	Succeeded by Freddie Pitcher
