= David Adeang =

President of Nauru since 2023

The Honourable David Adeang MP
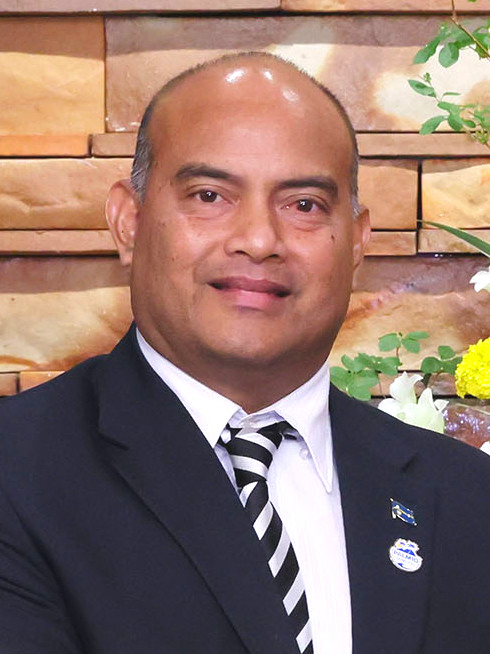
- Adeang in 2024

President of Naoero
- Incumbent
- Assumed office 30 October 2023
- Vice President: Lionel Aingimea
- Preceded by: Russ Kun

Member of Parliament for Ubenide
- Incumbent
- Assumed office 18 December 2001
- Preceded by: Joseph Hiram

Speaker of the Parliament of Nauru
- In office May 2004 – June 2004
- Preceded by: Terangi Adam
- Succeeded by: Riddell Akua
- In office 20 March 2008 – 18 April 2008
- Preceded by: Riddell Akua
- Succeeded by: Riddell Akua

Personal details
- Born: David Ranibok Waiau Adeang; 24 November 1969 (age 56) Yaren District, Nauru
- Party: Independent
- Other political affiliations: Nauru First (2000s)
- Relations: Kennan Adeang (father)
- Occupation: Public servant

David Ranibok Waiau Adeang (born 24 November 1969) is a Nauruan politician, currently serving as President of Nauru. Adeang is the former Speaker of the Parliament of Nauru, and Nauru's Minister of Finance and Justice, as well as the Minister Assisting the President of Nauru.

== Background and early career ==
David's father Kennan Adeang, thrice served as President of Nauru. David Adeang began his political career as a lawyer. After all Ubenide seats had been vacated on 6 November 2001, Adeang won a seat in the following by-election, ousting Joseph Hiram while the other three previous MPs regained their seats. In the parliamentary elections of May 2003, amidst political and economic turmoil, the Naoero Amo won 3 of the 18 seats, and Adeang was one of the elected members. The Naoero Amo entered a coalition with Ludwig Scotty and his supporters. Scotty became president and Adeang minister of finance in May 2003. He was the finance minister and Minister Assisting the President of Nauru only for three months, however, as Scotty's government fell in August 2003, and Kinza Clodumar became finance minister.

In April 2004, Adeang was charged with sedition along with Kieren Keke and Fabian Ribauw after a protest at Nauru's airport. He was the Speaker of the Parliament of Nauru from May 2004 to June 2004. In June 2004 Clodumar and the Naoero Amo united to re-elect Scotty as president. Clodumar remained finance minister, while Adeang became Minister of Foreign Affairs and Justice. Also, the charges against Adeang and the others were dropped. His appointment as foreign minister is interesting because he was the first foreign minister not to be the President of Nauru. That post had been given to the President since Nauru gained independence in 1968. Adeang was easily re-elected to Parliament from the Ubenide constituency in the October 2004 elections. Later that month, he left the position of justice minister, became finance minister, and retained the position of foreign minister.

He was a founding member of the Nauru First party, at one time the only political party on the island.

== Developments in 2007 ==
Adeang was easily reelected in the August 2007 parliamentary election. He received the most votes in the Ubenide constituency, which elects 4 seats.

=== Praise of Cuba ===
In September 2007, Adeang, as Foreign Minister, made a number of public statements deemed in the United States to be controversial. He extolled Cuba and criticized US foreign policy, during a visit to the Caribbean island.

=== Report of criticism of Adeang by US State Department ===
The US Department of State, referring to events investigated in 2007, reported criticism of Adeang in its Human Rights Report, issued for 2008. This criticism was included in the State Department's report, despite the fact that police, having undertaken an investigation of allegations of wrongdoing, made no attempt to prosecute Adeang.

=== Involvement with the demise of the Scotty government ===
Allegations of misconduct on the part of Adeang and Scotty's unwillingness to act against Adeang led to the resignation of several members of the government—Kieren Keke, Frederick Pitcher, and Roland Kun—and an unsuccessful motion of no-confidence against Scotty's government on 13 November 2007. Although a majority of those voting supported the motion (eight in favor, seven opposed), it fell short of the necessary nine votes. However, another vote on 19 December was successful in ousting Scotty, and Marcus Stephen was elected president; Stephen named Kieren Keke to replace Adeang as Foreign Minister.

== Developments in 2008 ==
=== Alliance with former President Rene Harris ===
In an unusual alliance, in March 2008 Adeang and former President Rene Harris moved to attempt a motion of no confidence in President Marcus Stephen, which was, however, thwarted by the resignation of the Speaker of the Parliament of Nauru. It was noted that Adeang had been a strong critic of Harris's record in government.

=== Appointment as Parliamentary Speaker ===
Subsequently, in March 2008, Adeang was appointed Speaker of the Parliament of Nauru, succeeding Riddell Akua. He entered office on 20 March 2008.

On 22 March, Adeang called a Parliamentary session, allegedly without informing government ministers, who therefore did not attend. Opposition MPs, Adeang included, constituted a majority of legislators present, and passed a ruling outlawing dual citizenship for Members of Parliament. The ruling, if applied, would affect senior Cabinet ministers Kieren Keke and Frederick Pitcher. Were they compelled to resign from Parliament, the Opposition would control a majority of seats in Parliament. The government rejected the legitimacy of the ruling, stating that it was unconstitutional because of the lack of parliamentary quorum. President Marcus Stephen accused Adeang and the Opposition of passing the ruling "after dark on Easter Saturday", "under candlelight". For his part, Adeang asserted that 22 March session of Parliament was valid.

=== Claims of a coup d'état ===
On 28 March, Adeang, as Speaker, ordered Keke and Pitcher to vacate their seats in Parliament. They refused to do so, and Adeang suspended the sitting.

On 31 March Adeang claimed that the government had mounted a coup: since the police refused to eject two government ministers from the chamber of Parliament, in accordance with his ruling of 28 March, the rule of Parliament no longer governed the police. The Government, in response, denied the claim, stating that they were awaiting a ruling from the Supreme Court on the issue.

The crisis continued into early April 2008, with Adeang stating that he would consider the Supreme Court's ruling as "just an opinion", and Keke responding that the Supreme Court, not the Speaker, had the jurisdiction to determine a member of Parliament's eligibility.

=== Adeang questions Supreme Court ruling; suspends President Stephen and his ministers ===
On 7 April, it was reported by the government that the Supreme Court had ruled in the government's favour, apparently confirming that the law forbidding members of Parliament from holding dual nationality was anticonstitutional and invalid, due to lack of quorum. The Court also reportedly rejected Adeang's claim that the courts have no jurisdiction over Parliament. Adeang said that he would seek legal advice before responding to the court's ruling.

Relations between Adeang, as Speaker of the Parliament of Nauru, and the Stephen Administration, remained under severe strain following the ruling, and the Administration's ministers continued to exercise executive powers without the support of Parliament.

Following 7 April release of the Supreme Court decision which ruled against the dual nationality law, with the passing of which Adeang was particularly identified, Adeang indicated that forty years of post-independence Parliamentary precedent had been set aside. For its part, the government of Marcus Stephen strongly welcomed the Supreme Court's ruling: whether or not for ideological and principled reasons also, it was seen as ensuring the immediate survival of the Administration.

On 10 April, following allegations of unruly behaviour in the chamber of the Parliament of Nauru, Adeang, as Speaker, suspended President Marcus Stephen from Parliament, along with all members who supported Stephen's Administration. On 18 April, Stephen declared a state of emergency, dissolved Parliament, and announced fresh elections. In so doing, President Stephen claimed to be seeking a way out of the impasse which has characterized the relationship between the Government and the Parliament of Nauru, since the Stephen Administration lost a working majority there. For Adeang, the step was one which he had been advocating for several weeks.

=== Replacement as Speaker ===
Adeang was replaced as Speaker of the Parliament of Nauru by Riddell Akua (who also preceded him as Speaker), following the elections of 26 April 2008, when President Marcus Stephen increased his support.

=== Loss of ally ===
With the death in July 2008 of former President Rene Harris, David Adeang lost an important ally with whom he had closely worked in the earlier part of 2008.

== Developments in 2013 ==
=== Waqa Cabinet ===
Following the 2013 parliamentary elections, in which he was re-elected, Adeang supported the election of Baron Waqa to the presidency. Adeang was appointed to the cabinet by Waqa, and was given the portfolios of Finance and Sustainable Development, Justice, and ministerial responsibility for the Eigigu Holdings Corporation and the Nauru Air Corporation. He was also appointed Minister Assisting the President of Nauru.

In July, as Waqa was out of the country, Adeang, as acting president, took the controversial decision of banning Nauruan media from broadcasting an interview in which Opposition MP Mathew Batsiua criticised the government's sacking of the chief of police. This act of censorship drew international media attention, and was condemned by the Opposition.

A few days later, Adeang once more banned an interview from being aired - this time, an interview of Opposition MP Kieren Keke criticising an agreement between the Nauruan and Australian governments over the resettlement in Nauru of foreign refugees arriving by boat in Australia. Adeang saw to the broadcasting of an interview in which he himself gave the government's position on the agreement, but did not allow the Opposition's view to be aired. He explained: "Kieren's interpretation about the MOU [memorandum of understanding with Australia] does not necessarily match our interpretation of the MOU, and I think ours is the right one".

== Presidency ==
On 25 October 2023, a vote of no-confidence passed through parliament against President Russ Kun. Following the vote, the parliament was unable to break a tie in their vote for president. On the next day of voting, 30 October, there was another vote for president, with a tie between MP Delvin Thoma and Adeang. In the next vote, Adeang won with ten votes to Thoma's eight.

Adeang was sworn into office on 31 October 2023. He announced his cabinet the same day.

== See also ==
- Politics of Nauru
- 2008 Nauruan parliamentary election
