= René Harris =

President of Nauru (1947–2008)

His Excellency The Honourable René Harris

President of Nauru
- In office 27 April 1999 – 20 April 2000
- Deputy: Remy Namaduk
- Preceded by: Bernard Dowiyogo
- Succeeded by: Bernard Dowiyogo
- In office 30 March 2001 – 9 January 2003
- Deputy: Remy Namaduk
- Preceded by: Bernard Dowiyogo
- Succeeded by: Bernard Dowiyogo
- In office 17 January 2003 – 18 January 2003
- Deputy: Remy Namaduk
- Preceded by: Bernard Dowiyogo
- Succeeded by: Bernard Dowiyogo
- In office 8 August 2003 – 22 June 2004
- Deputy: Derog Gioura
- Preceded by: Ludwig Scotty
- Succeeded by: Ludwig Scotty

Speaker of the Parliament of Nauru
- In office December 1986 – December 1986
- Preceded by: Ruben Kun
- Succeeded by: Kinza Clodumar

Member of Parliament for Aiwo
- In office 15 February 1977 – 22 February 1977
- Preceded by: Edwin Tsitsi
- Succeeded by: Himself
- In office 12 June 1977 – 26 April 2008
- Preceded by: Himself
- Succeeded by: Godfrey Thoma

Personal details
- Born: René Reynaldo Harris; 11 November 1947 Aiwo, Nauru
- Died: 5 July 2008 (aged 60) Denigomodu, Nauru

René Reynaldo Harris (11 November 1947 – 5 July 2008) was a Nauruan politician who served as President of Nauru for four terms between 1999 and 2004. He was a Member of Parliament from 1977 to 2008.

== Background and early career ==
Harris was born on 11 November 1947 in Aiwo, Nauru. He was a member of the Emea tribe.

He obtained his secondary education from Geelong College in Victoria, Australia. Prior to his election to parliament, Harris worked for the Nauru Phosphate Corporation (NPC) and was the Manager of the Nauru Pacific Line.

He was first elected as an MP for Aiwo in 1977 as a replacement for Samuel Tsitsi. His first term lasted seven days as he had to resign following a court conviction for assault. However, he won the resultant by-election with a convincing majority. Harris was elected Deputy Speaker of the Parliament in 1978. He resigned his seat in 1981, but was re-elected in the subsequent by-election five days later. and Speaker of the Parliament in December 1986. In 1992 he was appointed Chairman of the Board of Directors of the NPC.

In 1998, Harris was convicted of assault and jail-breaking by forcibly freeing three of his relatives from the Nauru Police lock-up with the help of two accomplices. The Australian Broadcasting Corporation television program "Foreign Correspondent" also claimed that as Chairman of the NPC, Harris spent more than A$231,000 on luxury items, holidays and a property in Melbourne. Harris maintained a luxury penthouse suite on the 51st floor of Nauru House in Melbourne.

== Presidential terms of office ==
Harris first became president on 27 April 1999 and remained in that post until 20 April 2000 when he was replaced by Bernard Dowiyogo, who retained that office until Harris resumed the presidency on 29 March 2001 following a vote of no-confidence by Dowiyogo. Dowiyogo eventually retained the presidency.

Harris was reelected President on 15 August 2003.

His government was responsible for the housing of Australian asylum seekers on the island and also Nauru's admission to the United Nations and full membership in the Commonwealth of Nations. Harris was criticized by the Nauruan opposition party (Naoero Amo) and the international community for corruption and violations of human rights. It was also under the Harris administration when Nauru controversially switched from recognising Taiwan to China, with the Chinese government providing Nauru's flagging economy some much needed aid.

His health was a major concern for at least the last 5 years of his life. In December 2003, Harris collapsed in Nauru's parliament building and was revived by Dr. Kieren Keke, a member of parliament and medical doctor.

On 22 June 2004, due to a political defection, he was ousted as president, and Ludwig Scotty succeeded him.

== Post-Presidency and controversies ==
In parliamentary elections later in 2004, Scotty's supporters won a majority of the seats and Harris made no further attempts to be reelected president. In the parliamentary election held on 25 August 2007, Harris was the only opposition member of parliament to be re-elected; Scotty's supporters won an even larger victory and it was believed that Harris might have no political supporters in Parliament.

After Nauru's main police station was burned on 7 March 2008 by protesters in Harris' Aiwo constituency who were upset by phosphate dust, the government accused Harris of instigating the protesters.

Harris's periods as President of Nauru were sometimes owing to his alliance with the influential Kinza Clodumar, himself a former president, but also exercising considerable negotiating weight in the Parliament of Nauru.

During Harris' tenure as President, Nauru took, and defaulted on a 234 million loan taken from General Electric. As a result, Nauru's overseas properties in Australia were repossesed. Concurrently, Nauru under Harris was accused of involvement in a passport-selling scheme and allowing the Russian Mafia to launder 70 Billion through Nauru's shell banks, facing severe sanctions as a result. He was also accused of siphoning funds from the Nauru Phosphate Royalties Trust and living extravangantly while the Nauruans lived through an economic crisis.

== April 2008 election and loss of parliamentary seat ==
In the parliamentary election held on 26 April 2008, Harris stood again but lost his seat; supporters of President Marcus Stephen won a majority. After 31 years in Parliament, this was the first time he lost his seat.

== Death ==
Harris suffered a heart attack on 4 July 2008 and died in Denigomodu as a result on the morning of 5 July. A state funeral was held for him later on the same day. He was aged 60 at the time of his death, and although relatively young, his political generation had been to some extent superseded by a government ministerial team about 20 years younger than him.
