= Ludwig Scotty =

President of Nauru (2003; 2004–2007)

His Excellency Ludwig Scotty
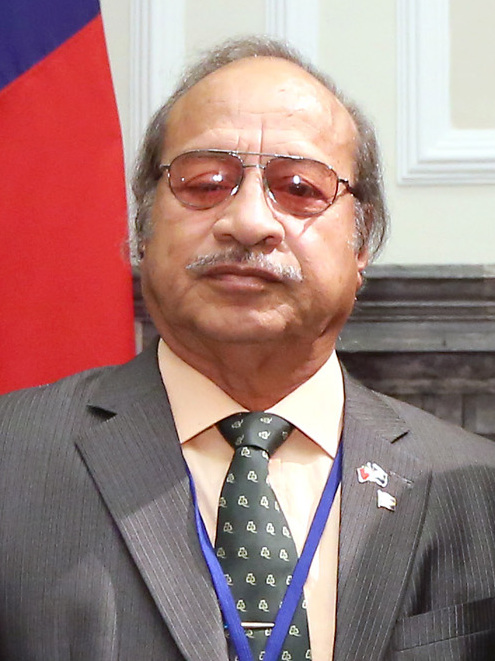

President of Nauru
- In office 22 June 2004 – 19 December 2007
- Deputy: David Adeang
- Preceded by: René Harris
- Succeeded by: Marcus Stephen
- In office 29 May 2003 – 8 August 2003
- Deputy: David Adeang
- Preceded by: Derog Gioura
- Succeeded by: René Harris

Speaker of the Parliament of Nauru
- In office 11 June 2013 – 13 July 2016
- Preceded by: Godfrey Thoma
- Succeeded by: Cyril Buraman
- In office 1 November 2010 – 18 April 2013
- Preceded by: Landon Deireragea (acting)
- Succeeded by: Landon Deireragea (acting)
- In office 24 February 2004 – 14 July 2004
- Preceded by: Nimrod Botelanga
- Succeeded by: Terangi Adam (acting)
- In office 25 May 2001 – 19 December 2002
- Preceded by: Aloysius Amwano
- Succeeded by: Vassal Gadoengin
- In office 13 April 2000 – 29 March 2001
- Preceded by: Ludwig Keke
- Succeeded by: Aloysius Amwano

Personal details
- Born: 20 June 1948 Anabar, Mandate of Nauru
- Died: 25 February 2026 (aged 77)
- Education: University of the South Pacific

Ludwig Derangadage Scotty (20 June 1948 – 25 February 2026) was a Nauruan politician who twice served as President of Nauru and was Speaker of Parliament five times between 2000 and 2016. He served as president from 29 May 2003 to 8 August 2003 and again from 22 June 2004 until his ousting in a vote of no confidence on 19 December 2007.

== Background and earlier career ==
Scotty grew up in Anabar in the north of Nauru; he attended secondary school from 1960 until 1964 and studied law at the University of the South Pacific in the Fijian capital city Suva. On 15 March 1983, he was first elected to the Parliament for his district Anabar; in his longtime tenure as parliament member Scotty was the chairman of the Bank of Nauru, the Nauru Rehabilitation Corporation and in the board of directors of Air Nauru.

He served as Speaker of Parliament from April 2000 to March 2001, May 2001 to December 2002, February 2004 to April 2004, November 2010 to April 2013, and June 2013 to July 2016, while representing the Anabar district. He was appointed Minister Assisting the President of Nauru in the cabinet of Derog Gioura from March 2003 to May 2003.

Scotty died from a short illness on 25 February 2026, at the age of 77.

== President of Nauru (2003) ==
At the end of the short administration of Derog Gioura, Ludwig Scotty was elected President of Nauru by a parliamentary vote of 10–7, defeating Centre Party leader and former President Kinza Clodumar.

Scotty was ousted in a vote of no confidence in August 2003 and was replaced as president by René Harris.

== Period in Opposition (2003–2004) ==
Scotty spent a short period in Opposition from August 2003 until June 2004, remaining a member of the Parliament of Nauru.

== President of Nauru (2004–2007) ==
Scotty returned as president on 22 June 2004 after a member of Harris's faction of the Parliament of Nauru defected. Scotty was re-elected to Parliament in elections in October 2004, and most of his allies also did well. In this term, Scotty became the first president of Nauru to give up the foreign affairs ministry, as David Adeang was appointed to that position.

Scotty's government implemented major reforms to restore the country's economy.

Scotty and his supporters won in the parliamentary election held on 25 August 2007. On 28 August, Scotty was re-elected as president with the support of 14 of the 18 members of parliament, defeating Marcus Stephen.

The liberal use of Parliamentary no confidence motions, the occasion of many crises of government over several years, seemed initially to have subsided under Scotty's widely respected tenure of office. A constitutional review was being proceeded with, with a view to improving the functioning of Parliament and the offices of state.

On 13 November 2007, a motion of no-confidence against Scotty's government was unsuccessful; although a majority of those voting supported the motion (eight in favor, seven opposed), it fell short of the necessary nine votes. The motion was led by Kieren Keke, and it was based on allegations of misconduct on the part of Adeang and Scotty's unwillingness to act against Adeang.

On 19 December 2007, however, a newly comprised majority in Parliament did succeed in ousting President Scotty through a new vote of no confidence (ten votes in favour, seven opposed). The motion was based on the same causes as the November vote. Marcus Stephen was sworn in as President of Nauru.

== Post-presidency and legacy ==
Ludwig Scotty remained a member of the Parliament of Nauru, following the no-confidence defeat in Parliament of his administration in 2007. Coming as it did only a few months after the landslide victory of his supporters at the polls in August 2007, his relinquishing of office so soon afterwards can be seen in terms of an element of promise and expectations unfilled.

Scotty’s second administration (2004–2007) was noted by some commentators as a period of relative political stability compared to the upheavals that preceded and followed it. During this time, policies associated with economic austerity were implemented. In early 2008, both government and opposition figures referred to the constitutional review process initiated under Scotty as part of their political legacy.

In April 2008, Scotty stood again for the Parliament of Nauru and was reelected to serve as a member.

In March 2010, former President Scotty intervened in the constitutional reform debate. Scotty doubted whether changes proposed by the current Government of Nauru commanded popular support.

=== Speaker of Parliament ===
Scotty served his first two terms as speaker from April 2000 to March 2001, and May 2001 to December 2002, after which he was elected as president.

In November 2010, Scotty was elected Speaker of the House again, breaking a 6-month deadlock which had paralysed the government. His election as Speaker enabled MPs to elect a President, and Marcus Stephen was duly re-elected President of Nauru. Scotty explained that he remained a member of the Opposition to Stephen's government (though he would of course carry out his duties in an impartial manner), but that he had accepted the position of Speaker so that Parliament could function (giving the Opposition a say in government), and so that a budget could be adopted. He explained that his decision was also due to the allegations over Opposition members receiving financial support from Australian company Getax. Speaker Scotty resigned on 18 April 2013 amid increasing parliamentary deadlock and infighting, started over his own attempt to dissolve Parliament, he was temporarily succeeded by Deputy Speaker Landon Deireragea who served as acting speaker until 25 April when Godfrey Thoma was elected as Speaker after being nominated by former President Marcus Stephen.

Scotty was returned to the chair after the 2013 parliamentary election as the nominee of the government of Baron Waqa. Scotty was elected with 14 votes to 5 five for opposition nominee Kieren Keke. His deputy was newly elected MP Ranin Akua who was elected unopposed.
