= Parliament of Nauru =

National legislature of Nauru

Coordinates: 0°32′50″S 166°55′00″E

Parliament of Naoero
- 25th Parliament of Nauru

Type
- Type: Unicameral

Leadership
- Speaker: Marcus Stephen, Non-partisan since 27 August 2019
- Deputy Speaker: Isabella Dageago, Non-partisan since 14 October 2025

Structure
- Seats: 19
- Political groups: Parliament Non-partisan (19)
- Length of term: 4 years

Elections
- Voting system: Dowdall system
- Last election: 11 October 2025
- Next election: 2029

Meeting place
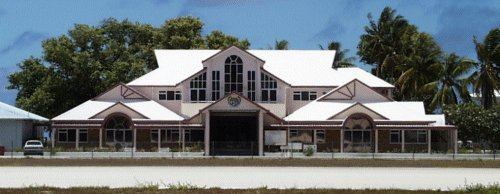
- Parliament Building, Yaren
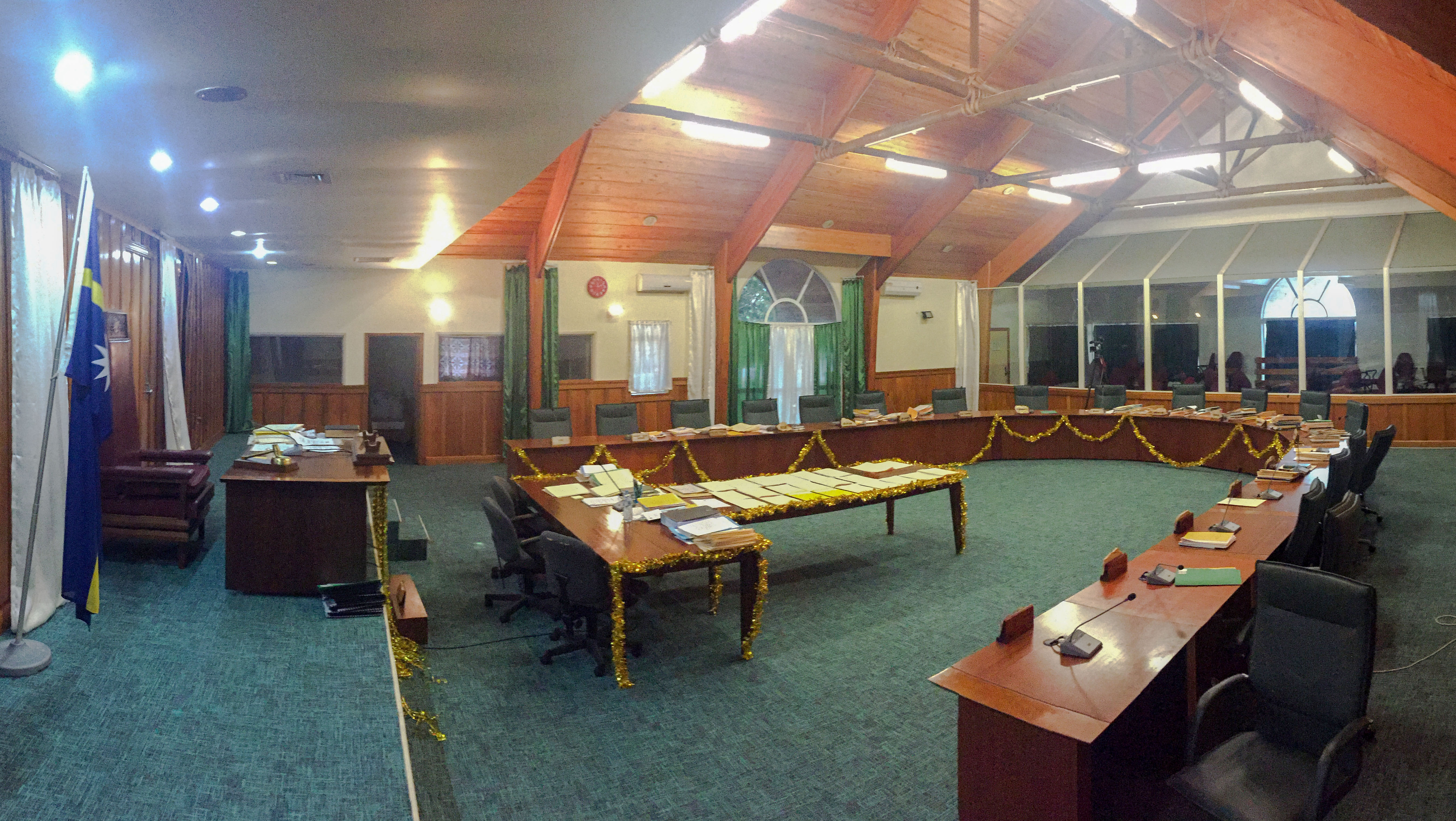

Website
- Official website

Footnotes
- * all candidates for Parliament officially stand as independents.

The Parliament of Nauru, officially the Parliament of Naoero, is the legislative body for the Republic of Naoero. It has 19 members, elected for a four-year term in multi-seat constituencies. The president of Nauru is elected by the members of the Parliament. The number of seats was increased to 19 following elections in 2013.

The members of the Parliament of Nauru are elected by a positional voting system.

== History ==
The Parliament of Nauru came into existence with the country's independence on 31 January 1968. The island was previously a United Nations Trust Territory administered by Australia. The Australian government's Nauru Act 1965 created the Legislative Council for the Territory of Nauru, consisting of 15 members – nine elected members, one ex officio member (the administrator of Nauru), and five "official members" nominated by the administrator.

On 22 March 2010, Radio New Zealand International reported that President Marcus Stephen had dissolved Parliament in readiness for elections on 24 April 2010. The election saw all 18 MPs returned, but by this stage, nine of them had formed the Opposition, resulting in a deadlocked Parliament. Another election was held in June 2010, as a result of the continuing deadlock. After weeks of uncertainty, the deadlock was resolved when the Opposition agreed to have one of its own MPs, Ludwig Scotty, elected as speaker. President Stephen then suggested that the number of MPs should be expanded to 19, to prevent future deadlocks. In late 2012, Parliament, under the leadership of President Dabwido, acted on this suggestion and passed a law increasing the number of seats to 19 after election in 2013, it is expected to prevent future deadlocks like the one in 2010.

== Current MPs ==
Constituency	Member	Position	Points	#1 Votes
Aiwo	Rennier Gadabu	Deputy Minister	458.775	243 / 874
Aiwo	Delvin Thoma	Minister	468.759	326 / 874
Anabar	Maverick Eoe	Minister	499.393	402 / 723
Anabar	Pyon Deiye		340.486	209 / 723
Anetan	Timothy Ika	Deputy Minister	568.517	394 / 821
Anetan	Marcus Stephen	Speaker	473.433	262 / 821
Boe	Asterio Appi	Minister	589.000	419 / 910
Boe	Wanganeen Emiu	Deputy Minister	412.450	176 / 910
Buada	Shadlog Bernicke	Minister	318.950	219 / 488
Buada	Bingham Agir		215.767	112 / 488
Meneng	Lionel Aingimea	Vice President	839.528	506 / 1,638
Meneng	Jesse Jeremiah	Minister	731.896	358 / 1,638
Meneng	Lyn-Wannan Kam	Deputy Minister	567.187	236 / 1,638
Ubenide	David Adeang	President	837.298	450 / 1,707
Ubenide	Russ Kun	Deputy Minister	620.795	295 / 1,707
Ubenide	Reagan Aliklik	Minister	668.881	330 / 1,707
Ubenide	Ranin Akua	Deputy Minister	454.962	130 / 1,707
Yaren	Charmaine Scotty	Minister	627.412	401 / 1,071
Yaren	Isabella Dageago	Deputy Minister	498.905	320 / 1,071
Source: Nauru Electoral Commission

== Speaker ==
The Speaker is the presiding officer of Parliament. The Speaker is an MP elected by the MPs. The Speaker has no vote in no-confidence votes and presidential elections.

Following the April 2008 election, Riddell Akua was appointed Speaker of the Parliament of Nauru. He replaced David Adeang.

Two weeks after the April 2010 election, Godfrey Thoma was elected Speaker. Due to the political deadlock, fresh elections were held in June, after which Parliament continued to be deadlocked until the election of Ludwig Scotty to the chair in November 2010. Scotty resigned at the end of the 20th Parliament in March 2013. Godfrey Thoma was elected to replace him. Following the 2013 election, Scotty was re-elected to the speaker's post.

== Sources ==
http://www.radioaustralia.net.au/international/2013-06-11/baron-waqa-named-as-new-nauru-president/1144022
http://www.nauru.gov.nr/government-information-office/media-release/honbaron-waqa-elected-president.aspx
