= 25th Parliament of Nauru =

Parliament on Nauru from 2025

The 25th Parliament of Nauru was elected in the 2025 parliamentary election. During the inaugural sitting of the new parliament, on 14 October, David Adeang was re-elected president.

== List of members ==
Constituency	Member	Position	Points	#1 Votes
Aiwo	Rennier Gadabu	Deputy Minister	458.775	243 / 874
Aiwo	Delvin Thoma	Minister	468.759	326 / 874
Anabar	Maverick Eoe		499.393	402 / 723
Anabar	Pyon Deiye		340.486	209 / 723
Anetan	Timothy Ika		568.517	394 / 821
Anetan	Marcus Stephen	Speaker	473.433	262 / 821
Boe	Asterio Appi	Minister	589.000	419 / 910
Boe	Wanganeen Emiu		412.450	176 / 910
Buada	Shadlog Bernicke	Minister	318.950	219 / 488
Buada	Bingham Agir		215.767	112 / 488
Meneng	Lionel Aingimea	Vice President	839.528	506 / 1,638
Meneng	Jesse Jeremiah	Minister	731.896	358 / 1,638
Meneng	Lyn-Wannan Kam	Deputy Minister	567.187	236 / 1,638
Ubenide	David Adeang	President	837.298	450 / 1,707
Ubenide	Russ Kun	Deputy Minister	620.795	295 / 1,707
Ubenide	Reagan Aliklik	Minister	668.881	330 / 1,707
Ubenide	Ranin Akua	Deputy Minister	454.962	130 / 1,707
Yaren	Charmaine Scotty	Minister	627.412	401 / 1,071
Yaren	Isabella Dageago	Deputy Minister	498.905	320 / 1,071
Source: Nauru Electoral Commission

== See also ==
- 2025 Nauruan parliamentary election
- Parliament of Nauru
- Elections in Nauru
