= Naoero Sports Centre =

Sports venue in Nauru

- Interactive map of Naoero Sports Centre
- Location: Topside, Meneng District, Nauru
- Coordinates: 0.5400°S 166.9360°E
- Owner: Government of Nauru
- Capacity: 1,000
- Surface: Artificial turf

Construction
- Groundbreaking: April 2023
- Opened: December 2027 (anticipated)
- Cost: ~ AU$104m
- Main contractor: China Harbour Engineering Company

Tenants
- Nauru Olympic Committee; AFL Nauru; Nauru national Australian rules football team Nauru Soccer Federation

The Naoero Sports Centre is a multi-use stadium currently under construction on the Pacific island nation of Nauru. The 1,000-seat stadium will have an artificial turf playing surface and is part of the larger Nauru Sports Centre which contains two floors of indoor facilities. The entire project is expected to cost at least AU$104m.

== Location ==
The stadium is located on Portion 230 in the Meneng District’s interior plateau, also known as Topside. The government of Nauru has identified the area around the stadium as a key location for land reclamation and future development, including a sustainably-designed neighborhood, as part of the Higher Ground Initiative.

== History ==
Since at least 2011, the government of Nauru had planned to construct a new 10,000-seat national stadium on reclaimed phosphate mining land in the interior of the island as part of the nation's unsuccessful bid to host the 2017 Pacific Mini Games. The venue, with a projected construction cost of AUD $4.2 million, would then have served as the home of Australian rules football in Nauru.

In July 2022, it was announced that Nauru had been selected to host the 2026 Micronesian Games, the first time the nation had been selected as host. As part of the announcement, minister of sports Maverick Eoe announced the upcoming construction of relevant and much-needed sports infrastructure projects, including an athletics stadium. The stadium would be modeled after the Majuro Track and Field Stadium, built to host the 2024 edition of the same tournament. The Marshall Islands stadium also includes an association football pitch.

Financial assistance for preparation for the tournament was offered from donor partners. These funds would be used, in part, for infrastructure projects. Several days after the original announcement, Minister for Sports Eoe stated that Nauru was hoping for additional donors to build the stadium and a proper weightlifting gym facility. During a November 2022 state visit, the government of Taiwan agreed to fund and assist with planning of the 2026 Micronesian Games, including covering the costs of the track and field stadium and other necessary facilities. The next step was for Nauru to present detailed plans and costing for the project.

In October 2022, deputy minister Jesse Jeremiah and secretary for sports Dagan Kaierua visited Majuro to inspect the stadium. In April 2023, blasting operations began in the Meneng District to construct an access road for the new stadium. In August, Taiwan’s deputy minister of foreign affairs Chung Kwang Tien visited the site to assess the progress of clearing and leveling the land which was formerly used for phosphate mining. The earthworks were being performed by the Nauru Rehabilitation Corporation and the Republic of Nauru Phosphate Corporation (RONPhos).

Nauru switched diplomatic allegiance to the People's Republic of China in January 2024. China reportedly offered Nauru unlimited infrastructure development aid, including the construction of the sports stadium, as part of the policy change. In May 2024, a team from the China International Development Cooperation Agency visited Nauru to inspect the stadium. By March 2025, approximately 75% of the earthworks and ground preparation were completed. By the end of the following month, it was announced that the earthworks at the site were completed.

A groundbreaking ceremony was held on 20 June 2025, officially beginning physical construction of the stadium. At this time it was stated that the stadium would include facilities that met all international standards, including a 10-lane track and indoor sports hall. A construction permit was issued to the China Harbour Engineering Company on 18 July, allowing construction to begin. The CHEC crew was expected to arrive and begin work in September 2025. After the construction company arrived, it was announced that 2026 Micronesian Games had been moved to January 2028 to accommodate the earlier delays in the stadium's construction. The contractors guaranteed that the stadium would be complete by December 2027, allowing the Micronesian Games to be part of Nauru's celebration of its 60th anniversary of independence.

A dynamic compaction ceremony was held on 1 October 2025, officially marking the beginning of stadium construction. Chinese representatives traveled to Nauru to evaluate construction progress in December 2025 and March 2026. On 15 May 2026, a ceremony was held to celebrate the installation of foundation piles after the completion of ground works, marking the beginning of structural construction of the stadium. In an August 2026 interview with the Australian Broadcasting Corporation, head coach of the Nauru national soccer team Charlie Pomroy stated that in his understanding construction on the stadium was on hold and construction had been paused for an unknown reason.

== See also ==
- Denig Stadium
- Linkbelt Oval
- Meneñ Stadium
