= Soccer in Nauru =

- Country: Nauru
- National team: Men's national team

Soccer is a minor sport in the island country of Nauru. The country is not a member of FIFA.

== History ==
The most popular code of football in Nauru has long been Australian rules football, which was introduced during the early 20th century by Australians working in the phosphate industry. Soccer had been introduced as early as the 1890s, but was overwhelmed by the organisation of Australian rules. In 1954, local rugby and soccer leagues were all wound up as the popularity of Australian rules football on the island skyrocketed. Soccer was re-introduced in the 1960s, by migrant workers from Kiribati, Solomon Islands, and Tuvalu. It enjoyed a period of relative popularity, and at one point the island had a six-team league. Tuvalu national football team players Alopua Petoa, Mati Fusi and Kivola Manoa are from Nauru.

A 2009 World Soccer article noted that organised soccer had "fallen apart" on Nauru, and that the island was unlikely ever to field a team at the Pacific Games (the main regional tournament for non-FIFA teams).

In 2018, Capelle and Partner, a large retail store in Nauru represented the nation in a 7-a-side tournament, where they faced Kilipati, a representative team of Kiribati, who they beat 5-2. The tournament also included Kilipati B, Solomon Islands and Tuvalu, with Tuvalu recording a 3-1 win over the Solomon Islands and an 8-1 win over Kilipati B. A match between Iran and Tuvalu was also held at the Nauru Regional Processing Centre. All teams were selected from diaspora communities in Nauru.

In the 2019-2020 budget report by the Government of Nauru it was noted that all available open spaces on the island are used for Australian rules football, making it difficult to promote other sports such as soccer and softball.

On 14 March 2024, former Premier League striker Dave Kitson was announced as Nauru's first ever national team manager, in addition to a role as international ambassador, with Charlie Pomroy appointed as the team's head coach. The Nauru Soccer Federation unveiled plans to organise a new regional sub-confederation, the Micronesia Football Federation, with other associations in Micronesia. Kiribati, the Federated States of Micronesia, Palau, Tuvalu and the Marshall Islands planned to participate, in addition to Nauru.

The main venue for recreational soccer in Nauru is the Meneng basketball court, where children usually play small sided matches using the fences or items such as bags or bottles as goal posts. As of June 2026, there is no known league, but these matches seem to occur regularly along with training sessions.

== Representative teams ==
The Nauru Soccer Federation has unsuccessfully applied for membership in the Oceania Football Confederation and FIFA in the past. The Rec.Sport.Soccer Statistics Foundation (RSSSF) suggests that it is "quite likely that there has been no official Nauru national soccer team." However, unofficial representative teams have been organised on at least two occasions.

On 2 October 1994, a combined Nauru team played a team of expatriate workers from Solomon Islands in Denigomodu, winning 2–1. Another Nauruan select team was raised in 2014, playing a team from the Nauru Regional Processing Centre to celebrate World Refugee Day. In 2020, Nauru Soccer Federation vice-president Kaz Cain announced that Nauru was considering creating its first-ever official national side for a 2021 tournament in Hawaii.

== Nauru Soccer League hoax ==
In 2020, a website for the new Nauru Soccer League appeared online. However, no such league existed and individuals involved with the sport on the island clarified that it was a hoax.

== Nauru soccer venues ==
Stadium	Capacity	District
New Nauru Stadium	1,000	Meneng
Denig Stadium	1,000	Nibok

== See also ==
- Nauru Soccer Federation
- Australian rules football in Nauru
