= Ijuw =

- District
- Ijuw district within Nauru
- Coordinates: 0°31′9″S 166°57′24″E
- Country: Nauru
- Constituency: Anabar

Area
  - Total: 1.1 km^{2} (0.42 sq mi)
- Elevation: 20 m (66 ft)

Population (2021)
  - Total: 276
- Time zone: (UTC+12)
- Area code: +674

Ijuw is a district in the country of Nauru, located in the northeast of the island. The area covers 1.1 km^{2} and has a population of 276 in 2021, making Ijuw the least populated district in the country. Ijuw is a part of Anabar constituency.

== Geography ==
Ijuw borders Anabar district to the north and Anibare district to the south. Ijuw is the northernmost point of Anibare Bay, and the easternmost point of Nauru. Two former villages, Ijuw and Ganokoro, are located within the district.

== Politics ==
Ijuw is part of the Anabar constituency in Nauru, which elects two members to the Parliament of Nauru. The current MPs representing the Anabar constituency are Maverick Eoe and Pyon Deiye for the 2025–2029 parliamentary term. The district does not have its own local council.

== See also ==
- Ijuh
- Anibare Bay
- List of settlements in Nauru
