= Australian rules football in Nauru =

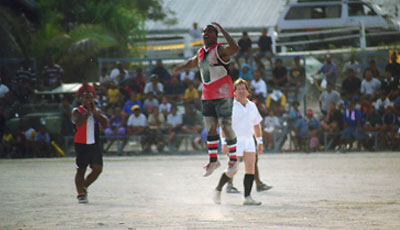
- Football being played at the Linkbelt Oval in 1999
- Country: Nauru
- Governing body: Nauru Australian Football Association
- National team: Nauru
- First played: 1910s
- Registered players: 680
- Clubs: 18 (men's); 5 (women's)

Audience records
- Single match: 3,000 (1999): Menaida vs Panzer, NAFA Grand Final, Linkbelt Oval, Aiwo

Australian rules football in Nauru (typically referred to as "football", "Australian Football" or less commonly as "AFL") dates back to the 1910s. Australian rules football became the national sport of Nauru after its independence in 1968. Today, its national participation rate is over 30%, the highest in the world.

The governing body is Nauru Australian Football Association, while the development body is AFL Nauru which is a member of the AFL South Pacific.

At international level, Nauru's national team has performed strongly in the International Cup and is particularly dominant at junior level where it has won numerous titles in tournaments such as the Oceania Cup.

== Structure ==
The football league system consists of one national league, run by the Nauru Australian Football Association (NAFA), based in the Linkbelt Oval, the country's only active stadium. The surface of the oval is crushed phosphate dust.

An interim Nauru Australian Football League (NAFL) has established after two workshops has been held under the Ministry of Sports led by Honorable Minister for Sports, Justice, & Health Mr Matthew Batsiua MP.

The Interim new Board Executives for NAFL elects Mr Roy Harris, Former Lions full back Player as the new president, football administration elects youth advocator a female to be part of the NAFL, Ann Hubert as Secretary others former interim president of NAFA Mr. David Dowiyogo, Fidelis Amwano, Samuel Grundler and Andy Cain are all elected by community groups.

== History ==
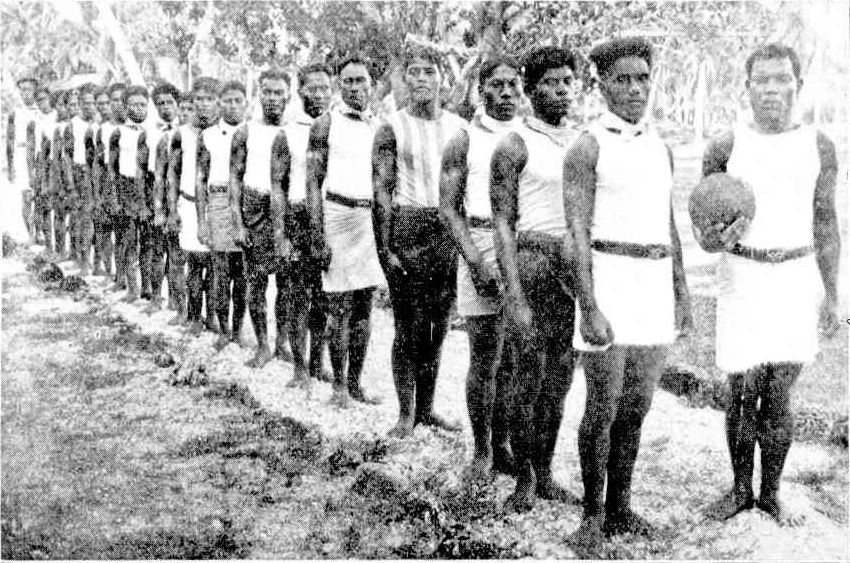
Police team lining up for a football match in 1916

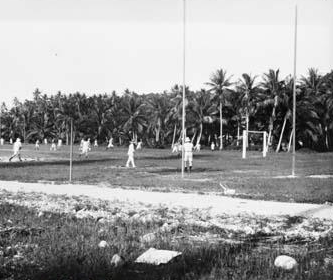
Football match at Nauru in 1923

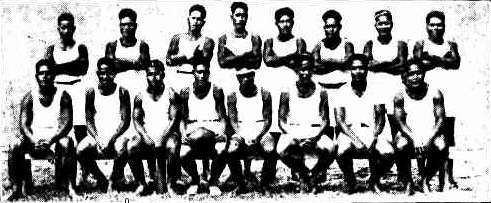
Denigomodu NAFA premiers 1932

One of the earliest mentions of football on Pleasant Island (Nauru) was a 20-man Nauruan police team in 1919 wearing sleeveless Australian rules guernseys; the photograph was extracted from the National Archives from 1916. Mr W. Easton, of Melbourne, and W. H. St Claire are reportedly credited with introducing the game to locals around this time, establishing regular competition and umpiring matches. Although rugby and soccer had been introduced first, the locals were more passionate about playing under Australian rules. Regular competition between local teams commenced in 1921.

By 1923, the League of Nations had made Australia one of the trustees of the island along with New Zealand and the United Kingdom. The Nauru Football League commenced on February 4, 1924. Reports in 1924 were that Australian rules had become the most popular code of football on Pleasant Island, with 250 of the country's 1,700 people eagerly participating, and that was without access to Australian footballs they had been enthusiastically using for years. The rough-and-tumble variation used a round ball made from Pandanus fibre and was played in bare feet, and it had become the "primary pastime" of the islanders. Early matches were played on ground shared with other sports until the Nauruan government established a dedicated ground at Boe District in 1924. The Victorian Football League responded to a request from the game's administrator, Mr T. Griffiths, to league administrator Mr E. L. Wilson and Mr Syd Sherrin of Collingwood for Sherrin-brand footballs, with the first shipment arriving, along with guernseys, shortly thereafter. Early observers noted the enthusiastic involvement of Nauruan women in the competition, with as many women as men attending games.

Early matches were between Boe and Denigomodu, who modelled themselves on the leading VFL teams of Carlton and Collingwood, respectively. The Victorian cirriculum was being adopted by 1927, and every district across the island had junior and senior Australian rules teams. By 1929, a governing body was established and, as an Australian trustee, was admitted to the Australian National Football Council—but only as an affiliate, not a full voting member. A new league was established, and the Nauruan league administrator W. A. Newman reported that regular matches were being played by numerous teams, that it was succeeding in keeping players healthy, and that neighbouring islands in the Pacific had expressed interest in participating. Seven district teams were part of the competition. Matches were watched by the entire population of the island. In 1931, the NAFA introduced the VFL system of finals.

A program began in 1935 to given young Nauruans the opportunity to study at Geelong Junior Technical School, as part of this program, the young students were taken to VFL matches. The result of this program was that in 1954, the Geelong Football Club had Nauru under its wings and football became so popular that it became the only code that children played on the island - without any players the local rugby and soccer leagues were all wound up.

In the 1960s, the Australian Capital Territory registered Nauru as a recruitment zone and in 1963, the Canberra Australian Football League's Turner Football Club recruited Labby (Labi) Harris (who went on to represent ACT in the National Amateur carnival), Jacob Grundler, and Willy Bernicke.

Following independence in 1968, the first national team had formed and was eager to compete. In 1976 Nauru sent its national team to tour Papua New Guinea, playing in front of a crowd of over 10,000 at Sir Hubert Murray Stadium in Port Moresby, though losing by 129 points. No overseas team has toured Nauru to play tests. Papua New Guinea had promised the NAFA a return tour for 1977, but could not agree on how to assemble a national team and raise the funds and as such never sent a team.

With many Nauruans attending schools in Geelong, a tradition was begun with the Geelong Football Club sending a player to umpire the NAFA Grand Final each year. In 1993, the guest was Geelong great Gary Ablett Sr. and he was greeted with much fanfare and a record crowd was in attendance for the match.

In October 1994, Bernie Quinlan visited as the financially struggling Fitzroy Football Club to help secure a AUD$1.25-million-dollar loan from Nauru Insurance to secure its future. With the collapse of Fitzroy in 1996, the club defaulted on its loan, however after the merger with the Brisbane Lions, Fitzroy's debt to Nauru was paid in full and it was able to come out of voluntary administration.

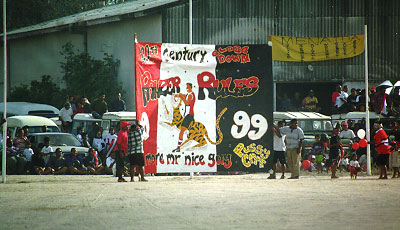
Panzer Saints banner for the 1999 Championship Finale

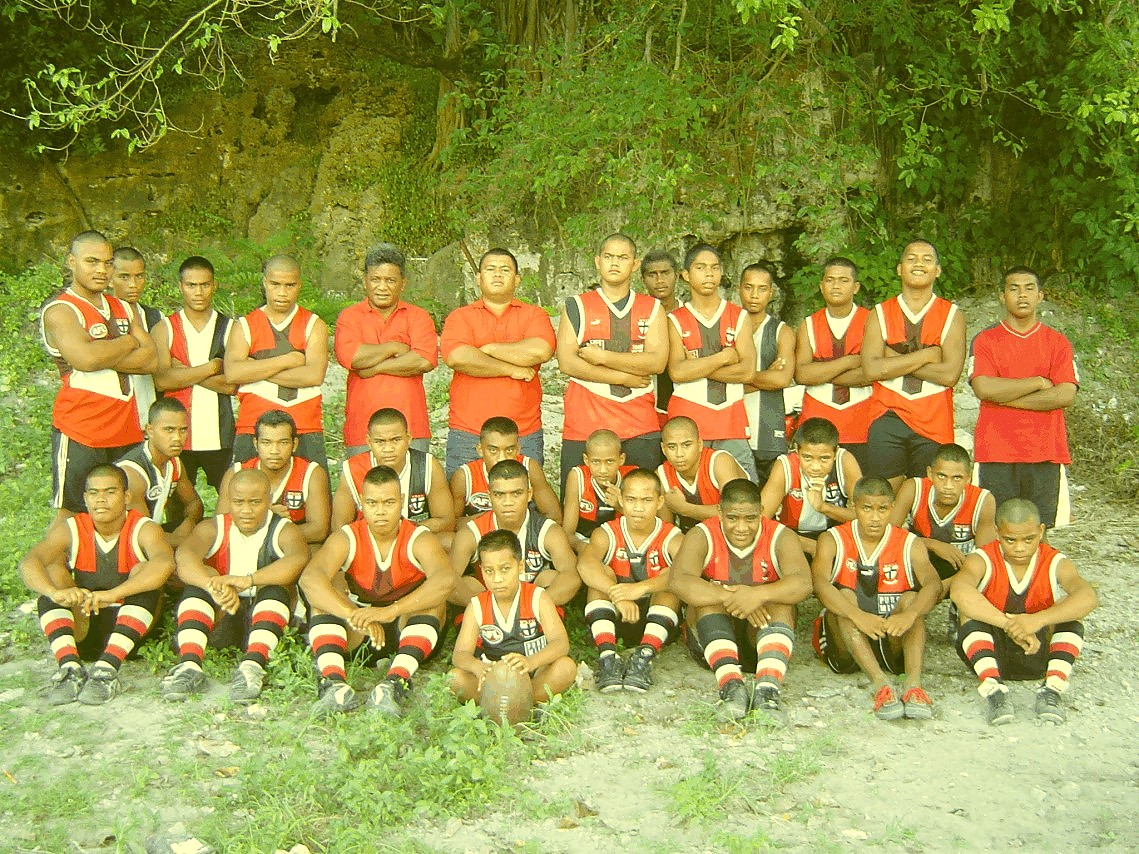
The Panzer Saints U17s squad in 2003

Early in the 2000s, the Economy of Nauru (once one of the richest in the world) collapsed, it slipped from developed to developing nation status and Australia began providing aid. The Australian Aid Program has been funding football in Nauru while the AFL Commission assumed the role of world governing body in 2005 and funds other nations, it has provided no funding for the game in Nauru.

In 2006 games in the NAFA final Series was stopped by the Minister for Sports after thugs, hooligans and bullies violated rules of NAFA.

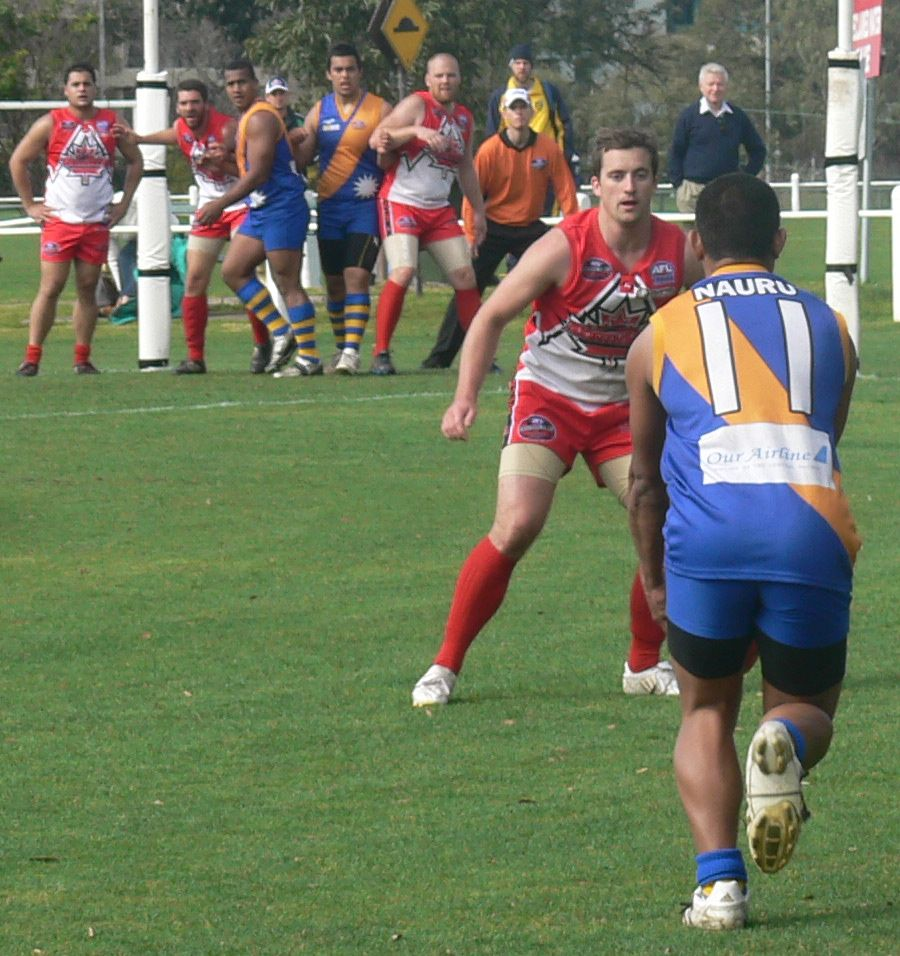
Nauru's George Quadina kicks for goal against Canada at the 2008 Australian Football International Cup.

In 2009, after a 3 year hiatus, a restructured league with a national draft was implemented to break down the fierce traditional rivalries that had resulted in increasing violence. New clubs participating in the competition are BOE Lions, Ace Magpies and Anibare Dockers.

The Australian Sports Foundation through AusAID began funding the reintroduction of rugby in Nauru in 2011, however grants from Australia to AFL Nauru would not arrive until 2017 with funding aimed at helping a Nauruan break into the AFL.

In 2011, Nauru Chief representative Yoshi Harris became the first Nauruan to be listed with an AFL club when he joined the GWS Giants, while he played matches in the club's reserves squad and the AFL Sydney competition he did not debut at senior level.

The first women's match was held in 2015.

Members of the Adelaide Crows AFLW team visited in March 2019. In 2019 the league was once again restructured to its original state to include original popular clubs.

Due to a massive outbreak during the COVID-19 pandemic between April and June 2022, with over 40% of the island contracting COVID, new restrictions were put in place, and the Digicel Cup was halted indefinitely.

In October 2022, the Australian government announced its commitment to a support package for the sport in Nauru.

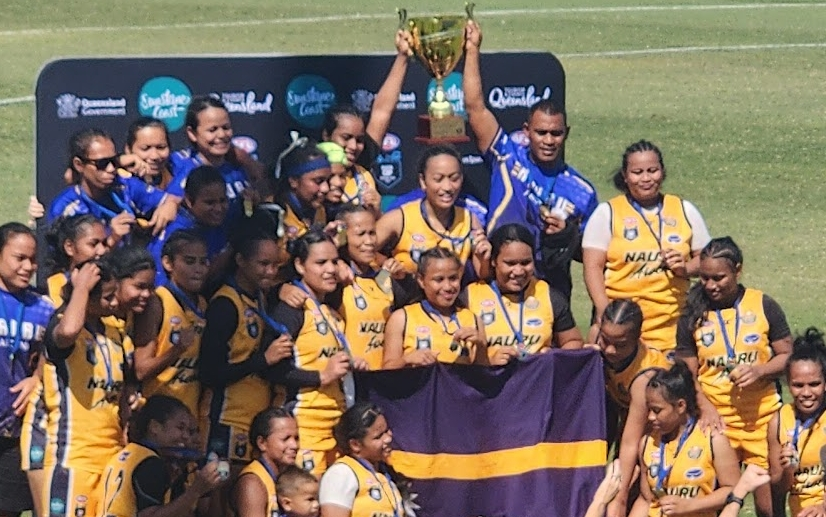
Nauru Aoreni winners of the 2024 Pacific Cup at Maroochydore, Queensland

In 2023 Nauru sent its male and female national talent academies to Queensland for a series of test matches in Brisbane and the Gold Coast against Papua New Guinea national teams and local sides. Nauru won both international matches, with the men's winning in the final minute of the game 5.8 (38) to 5.7 (27) and the women's being decided by a kick after the siren with Nauru holding on 3.9 (27) to PNG's 3.4 (22).

== Notable players ==
Although no players have yet to play senior matches in the AFL, several notable people, particularly Presidents of Nauru, have played in the NAFA.

- Marcus Stephen (President of Nauru) played for the local Aces team before going on to win multiple medals in Olympic weightlifting which also became a popular sport in Nauru.
- Hammer DeRoburt (President of Nauru)
- Bernard Dowiyogo (President of Nauru)
- Derog Gioura (President of Nauru)
- Mathew Batsiua (Nauru Health and Foreign Minister)
- Yoshi Harris (GWS Giants rookie and Nauru Chiefs representative)

== Participation ==
According to 2007 AFL International Census figures, there are around 180 players in the Nauru senior competition and 500 players in the junior competition, representing an overall participation rate of over 30% for the country.

== League system ==
Level	League
1	Elite League; 6 teams
2	Reserves League; 5 teams

=== Elite League ===
The Elite (Senior) League is made up of 6 teams, with a reserve league of 5 teams. Only two games per week can take place at the Linkbelt Oval, since as of 2005 the Menen Stadium had yet to be built and the Denig Stadium is not suitable for Australian rules games.

Teams

Team	Colours	From
Menaida Tigers	yellow and black	Aiwo, Buada
Panzer Saints	red-white-black	Meneng
Blues	blue-white	Anabar, Anetan, Anebare, Ewa
Ubenited Power	teal-white-black	Ubenide
Boe Lions	maroon-gold-blue	Boe
Aces	black-white	Yaren

Teams (Reserves)

Team	Colours	From
Eagles		Meneng
Ubenited Power	white-black	Ubenide
Esso	yellow-black	Aiwo, Buada
Yaren Magpies	black-white	Yaren
Frigates		Anabar

=== Junior league ===
There are also several levels of junior competition in Nauru, including under-15s, under-17s and under-18s.

== Audience ==
The NAFA championship final is an annual event which has in the past attracted up to 3,000 spectators (or 30% of the nation's population).

== National team ==
Nauru's national team is known as "The Chiefs"; their jersey is a variation of the colours and emblems of the Flag of Nauru, including the 12-pointed star but with a diagonal sash on the lower or upper of the diagonal. The Chiefs have competed against many nations in various competitions.

Nauru's first international match occurred when it toured Papua New Guinea in 1976. Among the better players were Royong Itsimaera (best on ground), Ali Iwagia, Johaness Itsimaera, Richardo Solomon, Vinson Detenamo, Manfred Depaune and Pres Nimes.

Nauru first participated in the 1995 Arafura Games in Darwin, Australia. The team—known as the "Frigatebirds" and coached by former VFL/AFL player Mark Yeates—finished third, winning the bronze medal.

In 2000, the team was rebranded to the "Chiefs" and travelled to Queensland to compete in the inaugural Web Sports Cup to compete against teams from Samoa and the Robina Roos from Australia. The Chiefs won both matches.

In 2001, the Chiefs again travelled to Queensland, winning another two matches, including one against the Gold Coast Old Boys. In the same year, the Chiefs won the gold medal at the 2001 Arafura Games, defeating the Japanese national side.

At the Australian Football International Cup in 2002, the Chiefs finished in 8th place, ranking Nauru the 9th-strongest Aussie Rules nation in the world.

Nauru withdrew from the 2005 International Cup.

They successfully raised the money required to attend the 2008 event, partly through sponsorships. However, due to intense rivalry and violence in the National League, the NAFA placed strict conditions on player eligibility to encourage a sense of unity, meaning that only players under 23 years old with a clean record were able to represent Nauru in the cup. A number of members of the national team were placed with clubs in country Victoria to spend a few months developing their skills before the tournament. The team performed exceptionally, being beaten once in the opening pool round by the eventual winners Papua New Guinea to place 5th overall.

== Sponsorship ==
The main sponsors of the NAFA are Capelle & Partner, M & M, OD N Aiwo Hotel, Menen Hotel, Digicel Nuru.

The winning team of the top league is granted a free flight to Australia, courtesy of Nauru Airlines, the second biggest financial supporter of the NAFA.

== See also ==
- Sport in Nauru
- Menen Stadium
- New Nauru Stadium
