= Anibare =

Anibare may refer to:

- Anibare district
- Anibare Bay
