= Ijuh =

Village in Ijuw, Nauru

- Village
- Location within Nauru
- Coordinates: 0°31′9.77″S 166°56′46.64″E
- Country: Nauru
- Constituency: Anabar
- district: Ijuw
- Elevation: 50 m (160 ft)
- Time zone: (UTC+12)
- Area code: +674

Ijuh is a small hill village of Nauru located in the Ijuw district, at the borders with the district of Anabar.

== See also ==
- Districts of Nauru
- List of settlements in Nauru
