= Nauruan parliamentary election, 2010 =

Nauruan parliamentary election, 2010 can refer to:

- April 2010 Nauruan parliamentary election
- June 2010 Nauruan parliamentary election
