= Timothy Ika =

Nauruan politician

The Honourable Timothy Ika MP

Member of the Nauruan Parliament for Anetan
- Incumbent
- Assumed office 2019

Timothy John Ika is a Nauruan politician.

== Career ==
Before entering politics, Ika worked as a boxing coach. He was the coach of Colan Caleb, who represented Nauru at the 2018 Commonwealth Games.

In the 2019 parliamentary election, Ika was elected to represent the Anetan Constituency. He was elected alongside Marcus Stephen. On 27 August, during the first session of the new parliament, Ika was nominated as deputy speaker, uncontested. Ika was re-elected in the 2022 election. On 29 September, Ika was appointed by President Russ Kun as Minister for Health and the Nauru Phosphate Royalties Trust. Ika served as Nauru’s Minister for Health for about 13 months, from the formation of the Russ Kun cabinet in September 2022 until the cabinet change in October 2023. He held the health portfolio alongside his role as Minister for the Nauru Phosphate Royalties Trust during the same period. He was succeeded as health minister by Charmaine Scotty, who had previously served as Minister of Health in 2013 to 2019, and he was succeeded as Minister for the Nauru Phosphate Royalties Trust by Shadlog Bernic

Ika ran in the 2025 election in Anetan and was re-elected as Member of Parliament, continuing his political career into the 25th Parliament. in May 2026, Ika became Deputy Minister for Land Management, assisting the Cabinet with land administration and related government duties. He supports the Minister for Land Management by helping manage land ownership systems, legal decisions about land, and administrative duties. The current Minister for Land Management is Charmaine Scotty, who assumed office in October 2023.

== Personal life ==
Ika is from the Ewa District. On 30 December 2011, he married Juliana Spanner of Buada District at the Christ the King Church.
