= Nauru Soccer Federation =

Governing body of soccer in Nauru

OFC
- Founded: 2018; 8 years ago
- FIFA affiliation: N/A
- OFC affiliation: N/A
- President: Kaz Cain
- Website: https://naoerosoccer.com/

The Nauru Soccer Federation (formerly known as the Nauru Amateur Soccer Association) is the governing body of soccer in Nauru and is under the auspices of the Nauru Olympic Committee. Nauru is not a member of the Oceania Football Confederation (OFC) and is one of the few sovereign states that is not a member of FIFA.

== History ==
The Nauru Soccer Federation had reportedly applied for membership in both the OFC and FIFA but was denied, presumably because of a lack of infrastructure and league system. In 2009 the Nauruan Minister of Sport Rayong Itsimaera indicated that the island nation desired to become a member of FIFA and the OFC wanted to accept them as a member but there were challenges preventing them from joining both bodies. Around this time, the Nauru Amateur Soccer Association had reportedly applied for membership in both the OFC and FIFA but was denied, presumably because of a lack of infrastructure and league system.

When the OFC met in 2011 to discuss and plan the 2013 Pacific Youth and Sports Conference, the Nauru delegation attended along with representatives from thirteen other Pacific football associations. In a December 2014 issue of The Blizzard-The Football Quarterly it was reported that the association existed and the then-president indicated that a Nauruan team practiced on the island's golf course.

After Lambert Maltock of the Vanuatu Football Federation was elected president of the OFC in 2019, the confederation indicated that funds were available to Nauru once the association has firm plans for developing the sport on the island. The Nauru Soccer Association was formally created in 2018. In 2020, the association’s vice-president, Kaz Cain, announced that Nauru was considering creating its first-ever official national side for a tournament in Hawaii in 2021. By 2020, the association was beginning to organize soccer tournaments and other development activities on the island once again but progressed was slowed by the COVID-19 pandemic later that year. In March 2021 it was announced that the Government of Australia was financing a number of sports programs in Nauru, including the OFC's Just Play Programme.

The federation was relaunched as the Nauru Soccer Federation in 2023 under the auspices of the Nauru Olympic Committee with the goal of creating a grassroots soccer culture, fielding its first-ever national team, and eventually joining the Oceania Football Confederation and FIFA. In December 2023, Charlie Pomroy was announced as the national team manager while Gareth Johnson, Director of Football for Cambodian League 2 club Angkor City FC, joined as Head of Federation. Also joining the project was Paul Watson. Nauru native Kaz Cain served as President. Nauru's goal was to join the likes of the Federated States of Micronesia and the Marshall Islands in increasing participation in the sport in their countries. Johnson stated: "If we do not play at least one match in a Nauru kit I will see 2024 as a failure."

On 14 March 2024, former Premier League striker Dave Kitson was announced as Nauru's national team manager and international ambassador.

The Nauru Soccer Federation unveiled plans to organise a new regional sub-confederation, the Micronesia Football Federation, with other associations in Micronesia. Kiribati, the Federated States of Micronesia, Palau, Tuvalu and the Marshall Islands planned to participate, in addition to Nauru.

In August 2025, the Nauru Soccer Federation announced their intention to provide every child under 14 with a football, creating a fundraiser campaign named 'One Child One Ball'.

As of June 2026, the Nauru Soccer Federation had decided to delay attempts to organize a national football team and rather focus on creating a 'grassroots culture' in Nauru alongside identifying diaspora players in Fiji and Australia. They aim to use this as a pipeline to their future national team.

As of June 2026 the Nauru Soccer Federation are working together with the Marshall Islands Soccer Federation, Niue Football Association, Kiribati Islands Football Association and other Micronesian nations to help develop football.

== See also ==
- Nauru national soccer team
- Soccer in Nauru
