= Nauru national football team =

Nauru national football team may refer to two national sports teams of the Republic of Nauru:

- Nauru national Australian rules football team, nicknamed the Chiefs
- Nauru national soccer team
