= April 2010 Nauruan parliamentary election =

- 24 April 2010
- All 18 seats in the Parliament of Nauru
Party	Seats	+/–
Supporters of Marcus Stephen	9	−3
Other independents	9	+3
This lists parties that won seats. See the complete results below.
President before	President-designate
Marcus Stephen; Independent	Marcus Stephen; Independent

Parliamentary elections were held in Nauru on 24 April 2010, following the dissolution of parliament by President Marcus Stephen on 16 March 2010. The election was called due to repeated attempts to oust the government of Marcus Stephen in votes of no-confidence. There were 86 candidates, eight of them women.

== Background: the 'Getax affair' ==
Australian officials have accused the Australian company Getax, which is an important buyer of Nauruan phosphate, of having precipitated the election by destabilising the Stephen government. Specifically, Getax had offered the Nauruan government a loan of A$25 million with a 15% interest rate, which, according to an investigative article in The Australian, "would be likely to have resulted in the country defaulting on its repayments, triggering contract provisions that would have let Getax take over the Nauru-owned phosphate industry". The Stephen government rejected the proffered loan. At the time, following the results of the 2008 election, the government had a parliamentary majority consisting in 12 MPs. Shortly thereafter, Getax organised and financed a trip to Singapore for the six opposition MPs and three of the government MPs. The latter three (including Aloysius Amwano) then joined the ranks of the opposition, causing a parliamentary stalemate, and thus the April election.

In October 2010, The Australian published an article, based on revelations by Australian officials and on documents published by the Nauruan authorities, revealing Getax's activities, as well as seemingly inexplicable spending levels by opposition MPs, well beyond the means afforded by their salaries. It also included a testimony alleging that members of the opposition had paid sums of money to potential voters. Questioned by The Australian, Baron Waqa, leader of the opposition, would neither confirm nor deny the claim that Getax had financed the opposition's campaign, but stated: "Getax has always helped Nauru. [...] Getax is disappointed with the way the country is running".

The Australian Federal Police launched an investigation into the accusations that Getax had bribed Nauruan officials (specifically, opposition and government non-Cabinet MPs) in the hopes that a new government would sign a deal with it on the selling of phosphate.

== Electoral system ==
Nauru uses a modified Borda count electoral system in eight multi-member districts.

== Results ==
On 26 April it was announced that provisional results indicated that every single one of the 18 members of parliament had been re-elected. This was confirmed on Monday 26 April.

Party	Votes	%	Seats
Supporters of Marcus Stephen			9
Other candidates			9
Total			18
Valid votes	5,017	96.44	
Invalid/blank votes	185	3.56	
Total votes	5,202	100.00	
Source: Australia Network News, IPU

=== By constituency ===
Constituency	Candidate	Votes	Notes
Aiwo	Godfrey Thoma	284.433	Re-elected
Aiwo	Dantes Tsitsi	282.983	Re-elected
Aiwo	Milton Dube	256.583	
Aiwo	Aaron Cook	255.783	
Aiwo	Preston Jovani Thoma	226.283	
Aiwo	Invalid/blank votes	8	
Aiwo	Total votes cast	580	
Anabar	Ludwig Scotty	268.525	Re-elected
Anabar	Riddell Akua	216.436	Re-elected
Anabar	Tyrone Deiye	191.210	
Anabar	Jeb Nobob Bop	119.785	
Anabar	Johnny Panser Olsson	119.561	
Anabar	Melissa Ika	119.275	
Anabar	Nicholas Yanaw Duburiya	114.627	
Anabar	David Peter Gadaraoa	111.126	
Anabar	David Aingimea	102.582	
Anabar	Vincent Scotty	92.352	
Anabar	Espen Jubal Fritz	87.003	
Anabar	Invalid/blank votes	16	
Anabar	Total votes cast	541	
Anetan	Marcus Stephen	355.436	Re-elected
Anetan	Landon Deireragea	277.474	Re-elected
Anetan	Cyril Buraman	253.640	
Anetan	Remy Namaduk	199.674	
Anetan	Cheyenne Timothy Ika	193.581	
Anetan	Begg Adire	179.881	
Anetan	Creiden Fritz	176.407	
Anetan	Invalid/blank votes	12	
Anetan	Total votes cast	643	
Boe	Baron Waqa	245.466	Re-elected
Boe	Mathew Batsiua	244.570	Re-elected
Boe	Vollmer Mercury Appi	183.651	
Boe	Abraham Aremwa	173.416	
Boe	Joy Edith Heine	149.674	
Boe	Kinza Clodumar	146.555	
Boe	Bryan Tetanko Star	146.083	
Boe	Dale Richard Cecil	110.142	
Boe	Morgan El-Grico Solomon	108.311	
Boe	Invalid/blank votes	8	
Boe	Total votes cast	541	
Buada	Roland Kun	255.531	Re-elected
Buada	Shadlog Bernicke	238.610	Re-elected
Buada	Vinson Detenamo	174.637	
Buada	Alexander Stephen	154.076	
Buada	Arrow Juliante Depaune	144.806	
Buada	Terangi Adam	142.565	
Buada	Sean Halstead	129.568	
Buada	Elchen Anabella Solomon	119.136	
Buada	Invalid/blank votes	6	
Buada	Total votes cast	506	
Meneng	Rykers Solomon	312.714	Re-elected
Meneng	Sprent Dabwido	283.346	Re-elected
Meneng	Lyn-Wannan Kam	221.761	
Meneng	Doneke Jim Benedict Kepae	211.810	
Meneng	Elvin Squire Brechtefeld	207.078	
Meneng	David Russell Daoe	168.234	
Meneng	Alvin Harris	166.914	
Meneng	James Degangan Bop	155.870	
Meneng	Rick Daoe	147.344	
Meneng	Davey Roxen Debagabene Agadio	144.354	
Meneng	Darlyne Faith Harris	143.638	
Meneng	Simpson Simon	134.687	
Meneng	Linko Jereco Jeremiah	131.396	
Meneng	Dogabe Abner Jeremiah	130.296	
Meneng	Jesiel De Gauli Jeremiah	121.688	
Meneng	Invalid/blank votes	48	
Meneng	Total votes cast	856	
Ubenide	David Adeang	355.162	Re-elected
Ubenide	Freddie Pitcher	313.199	Re-elected
Ubenide	Valdon Dowiyogo	304.881	Re-elected
Ubenide	Aloysius Amwano	257.967	Re-elected
Ubenide	Julian Itsimaera	212.316	
Ubenide	Ranin Akua	196.876	
Ubenide	Maria Gaiyabu	189.385	
Ubenide	Greta Diva Harris	189.069	
Ubenide	George Giovanni Gioura	177.318	
Ubenide	Vyko Pentax Adeang	171.666	
Ubenide	Fabian Ribauw	165.503	
Ubenide	Chet Hardy Tatum	157.865	
Ubenide	Bernadette Eimiriken Aliklik	143.988	
Ubenide	Renos Renige Agege	132.126	
Ubenide	Anthony Roteb Garabwan	129.091	
Ubenide	Joseph Hiram	118.893	
Ubenide	Ransom Fidelis Olsson	117.408	
Ubenide	Skipper Diovanni Hiram	113.075	
Ubenide	Knox Tulensru Tulenoa	111.805	
Ubenide	Cameron Valentino Tatum	103.441	
Ubenide	Walton Deigirimout Doguape	102.311	
Ubenide	Darnard Dongobir	100.935	
Ubenide	Invalid/blank votes	79	
Ubenide	Total votes cast	1,126	
Yaren	Dominic Tabuna	208.267	Re-elected
Yaren	Kieren Keke	203.009	Re-elected
Yaren	Charmaine Scotty	185.754	
Yaren	Pres Nimes Ekwona	110.948	
Yaren	Andrew James Kaierua	96.352	
Yaren	Brian Amwano	85.693	
Yaren	John Daigon Julius	84.542	
Yaren	Moses Alexius Neneiya	82.236	
Yaren	Johnny Taumea Agadio	77.618	
Yaren	Invalid/blank votes	8	
Yaren	Total votes cast	409	
Source: Republic of Nauru Government Gazette, 24 April 2010

== Aftermath ==
Parliament met for a first session on Tuesday 27 April, to elect a speaker. However, all four nominated candidates were rejected. Parliament is now to resume on Thursday, with the Marcus Stephen administration continuing in a caretaker capacity.

In its third sitting on 4 May 2010, the speaker election failed yet again. After a fourth failed attempt, the opposition floated the possibility of holding another election. Following the fifth failed attempt, Stephen proposed reforms before early elections, such as electing the speaker from outside parliament to break the deadlock.

In a sixth attempt on 13 May 2010, Godfrey Thoma was finally elected speaker. He immediately proposed to dissolve parliament again. As the government refused to do this, he resigned on 18 May 2010; it seemed possible that the two camps might form a coalition government to break the deadlock.

Progress was finally made when the government's nominee for speaker, Dominic Tabuna, was finally elected on 1 June 2010 in two rounds of balloting. Indirect presidential elections were then set for 3 June 2010. They were then postponed to 4 June 2010, and when they failed again on that date, Tabuna resigned.

Following seven weeks of deadlock, parliament was dissolved on 11 June 2010 and an early election called for 19 June 2010.
