= 2004 Nauruan parliamentary election =

Parliamentary elections were held in Nauru on 23 October 2004. Non-partisan followers of Ludwig Scotty won a majority, and he was elected president by the parliament (the Nauruan president is effectively a prime minister as he is also an MP, as is the case in South Africa and Botswana).

== Background ==
In September 2004, health minister and MP Kieren Keke was suspended by Speaker Russell Kun, an opposition MP, due to having dual Nauruan and Australian citizenship. The Chief Justice of Nauru ruled that Keke could remain an MP, but Speaker Kun did not allow Keke to return to his parliamentary seat until the undoing of his suspension was voted on by parliament. Gridlock then resulted in parliament failing to pass a new budget by the September deadline. On 30 September, President Ludwig Scotty declared a state of emergency and dissolved parliament. On 1 October, the government announced the resultant snap election would be held on 23 October. Opposition MPs accused the use of emergency powers and dissolution of parliament by the president of being unconstitutional. By 12 October, President Scotty's actions were upheld by the chief justice.

There were 76 candidates in the snap election. All sitting MPs sought re-election.

== Results ==
Party	Seats
Supporters of Ludwig Scotty	11
Other candidates	7
Total	18
Source: Psephos

=== By constituency ===
Constituency	Candidate	Votes	Notes
Aiwo	Godfrey Thoma	233.246	Elected
Aiwo	René Harris	174.951	Elected
Aiwo	Amos Randall Cook	158.099	
Aiwo	Dantes Tsitsi	150.044	
Aiwo	Elkoga Gadabu	136.150	
Aiwo	Allan Ririanang Thoma	133.796	
Aiwo	Reagan Conrad Moses	126.055	
Aiwo	Preston Thoma	124.283	
Aiwo	Invalid/blank votes	12	
Aiwo	Total votes cast	467	
Anabar	Ludwig Scotty	304.617	Elected
Anabar	Riddel Akua	282.217	Elected
Anabar	James Deireragea	169.517	
Anabar	Godfrey Itine Waidabu	165.333	
Anabar	Tyrone Vilmos Deiye	144.633	
Anabar	Invalid/blank votes	4	
Anabar	Total votes cast	471	
Anetan	Marcus Stephen	226.239	Elected
Anetan	Vassal Gadoengin	200.700	Elected
Anetan	Remy Namaduk	181.568	
Anetan	Landon Deireragea	170.257	
Anetan	Cyril Buraman	153.923	
Anetan	Paul Bucky Ika	135.814	
Anetan	Rimone Tom	134.314	
Anetan	Aloysius Gonzaga Namaduk	101.756	
Anetan	Invalid/blank votes	9	
Anetan	Total votes cast	489	
Boe	Mathew Batsiua	223.206	Elected
Boe	Baron Waqa	211.822	Elected
Boe	Kinza Clodumar	173.887	
Boe	Bernard Teia Grundler	131.259	
Boe	Tazio Gideon	119.120	
Boe	Detonga August Deiye	118.571	
Boe	Chanda Pasulia Deiranauw	107.792	
Boe	Clinton Benjamin	102.216	
Boe	Isaac Eobwaoin Aremwa	99.308	
Boe	Invalid/blank votes	11	
Boe	Total votes cast	466	
Buada	Roland Kun	145.324	Elected
Buada	Terangi Adam	131.967	Elected
Buada	Thomas Star	123.243	
Buada	Vinson Detenamo	122.610	
Buada	John Palik Agir	109.110	
Buada	Nelson De Burma Tamakin	104.793	
Buada	Manfred Rabaima Depaune	84.890	
Buada	Invalid/blank votes	2	
Buada	Total votes cast	319	
Meneng	Dogabe Jeremiah	279.499	Elected
Meneng	Sprent Dabwido	239.733	Elected
Meneng	Lionel Aingimea	205.362	
Meneng	Doneke Kepae	198.473	
Meneng	Nimrod Botelanga	190.719	
Meneng	Rykers Solomon	181.956	
Meneng	Simpson Arthur Simon	151.399	
Meneng	Porthos Bwaidongo Bop	147.613	
Meneng	Roxen Davey Agadio	137.590	
Meneng	Lockley Denuga	133.408	
Meneng	Invalid/blank votes	19	
Meneng	Total votes cast	656	
Ubenide	David Adeang	343.183	Elected
Ubenide	Fabian Ribauw	308.237	Elected
Ubenide	Freddie Pitcher	254.332	Elected
Ubenide	Valdon Dowiyogo	231.298	Elected
Ubenide	Aloysius Amwano	213.955	
Ubenide	Alf Diranga Itsimaera	212.395	
Ubenide	Ellington Dowabobo	174.727	
Ubenide	Russell Kun	166.072	
Ubenide	Francis Detsibanga Amram	159.408	
Ubenide	Celestine Eoaeo	156.336	
Ubenide	Derog Gioura	154.428	
Ubenide	Anthony Roteb Garabwan	149.513	
Ubenide	Joseph Hiram	147.317	
Ubenide	Francis Maaki Deireragea	144.278	
Ubenide	Dempsey Keppa	141.770	
Ubenide	Renos Renige Agege	137.293	
Ubenide	Arde Ricky Bam	135.200	
Ubenide	Invalid/blank votes	41	
Ubenide	Total votes cast	980	
Yaren	Kieren Keke	167.444	Elected
Yaren	Dominic Tabuna	126.904	Elected
Yaren	Douglas Dogura Audoa	111.515	
Yaren	Pres Nimes Ekwona	102.409	
Yaren	Leo Keke	93.985	
Yaren	Nodel Marcus Neneiya	91.999	
Yaren	John Daigan Akubor	78.211	
Yaren	Roger Raigide Iwugia	68.071	
Yaren	Johnny Taumea Agadio	61.903	
Yaren	Invalid/blank votes	10	
Yaren	Total votes cast	329	
Source: Republic of Nauru Government Gazette, 23 October 2004

== Aftermath ==
The election was a victory for the government. All nine government MPs were re-elected. Seven of nine opposition MPs were voted out. Speaker Kun was among those voted out.

Government MP Vassal Gadoengin was elected by parliament as speaker. Dogabe Jeremiah was elected deputy speaker. Scotty was re-elected president on 26 October. Scotty was elected unopposed after David Adeang and Valdon Dowiyogo declined nomination.
