= Meneng =

Meneng may refer to:

- Meneng District, Nauru
  - Meneng Constituency
  - Meneng Hotel
  - Meneng Stadium
