= 2003 Nauruan parliamentary election =

Parliamentary elections were held in Nauru on 3 May 2003 to elect members of the Parliament of Nauru. The election took place with Nauru having economic difficulties and a large budget deficit. This was the main issue in the election, which followed a period where a number of presidents had been elected for short periods of time. However the election resulted in deadlock for several weeks afterwards, with parliament divided between three candidates for president. It was only at the end of May that Ludwig Scotty was elected as the new president of Nauru and was able to form a new government.

== Background ==
Under the constitution of Nauru the 18 members of parliament are elected at least every 3 years from 8 constituencies. Voters rank the candidates with the top 2 candidates being elected from 7 constituencies and 4 being elected from the 8th constituency. The President of Nauru is elected by the members of parliament from among themselves and can be removed by a majority vote in parliament.

Following the last election in 2000 Bernard Dowiyogo was elected president after the then president René Harris resigned. However Dowiyogo was defeated in a motion of non-confidence in April 2001 and Harris became president again. Harris served until 2003, but with the budget deficit increasing to almost half of Nauru's gross domestic product by 2002 and many government workers having not been paid in months, he was ousted after an extended deadlock in parliament in January 2003. Dowiyogo became president once more and served until his death in the United States in March 2003. Derog Gioura then became acting president until elections could be held in May.

== Campaign ==
Major issues in the election included corruption and the mismanagement of the finances of Nauru, combined with declining incomes from the mining of phosphate. This had led the Asian Development Bank to state that Nauru's economy was in big trouble, with many public sector workers receiving their first pay in months on the day before the election. Another issue in the election was the detention centres set up in Nauru for people seeking asylum in Australia.

During the campaign for the election in which just under 4,500 people were eligible voters, the education minister Anthony Audoa called on Australia and New Zealand to run the election, as he claimed that his country would be unable to conduct a free and fair election. However President Gioura said Audoa had no authority to make that call and said that Nauru did not need any help in running the election. Audoa had had responsibility for the Nauru Phosphate Royalties Trust removed by President Gioura and the two men had fallen out as a result.

== Results ==
The results saw 6 new members of parliament elected, with the remaining 12 retaining their seats. 15 of those elected were not members of any party, while the Nauru First party had the other 3 members. Among the new members were 2 of the Nauru First party and the Commonwealth Games gold medallist Marcus Stephen. While 5 sitting members lost seats including the education minister Anthony Audoa; the president Derog Gioura and the former presidents Kinza Clodumar and Rene Harris were re-elected.

Party	Seats
Nauru First	3
Independents	15
Total	18
Source: IPU

=== By constituency ===
Constituency	Candidate	Votes	Notes
Aiwo	Godfrey Thoma	200.160	Elected
Aiwo	René Harris	161.819	Elected
Aiwo	Amos Randall Cook	146.710	
Aiwo	Marlene Moses	114.755	
Aiwo	David Libokimedo Agir	112.767	
Aiwo	Preston Thoma	112.460	
Aiwo	Alfie Aongo Moses	105.502	
Aiwo	Invalid/blank votes	10	
Aiwo	Total votes cast	368	
Anabar	Ludwig Scotty	198.900	Elected
Anabar	Riddel Akua	194.517	Elected
Anabar	James Deireragea	190.650	
Anabar	Godfrey Atsine Waidabu	133.933	
Anabar	David Peter Gadaraoa	122.267	
Anabar	Invalid/blank votes	7	
Anabar	Total votes cast	375	
Anetan	Marcus Stephen	215.278	Elected
Anetan	Remy Namaduk	189.377	Elected
Anetan	Vassal Gadoengin	145.460	
Anetan	Cyril Buraman	132.851	
Anetan	Paul Bronwick Ika	112.847	
Anetan	Landon Deireragea	112.574	
Anetan	Kelvin Hubert	105.990	
Anetan	Julie Olsson	96.560	
Anetan	Rimone Tom	93.792	
Anetan	Timothy Aingimea	81.858	
Anetan	Jacobus Tevaki Fritz	81.417	
Anetan	Invalid/blank votes	14	
Anetan	Total votes cast	467	
Boe	Baron Waqa	179.606	Elected
Boe	Kinza Clodumar	168.926	
Boe	Mathew Batsiua	166.739	
Boe	Tazio Gideon	153.448	
Boe	Clinton Benjamin	124.843	
Boe	Chanda Pasulia Deiranauw	120.185	
Boe	Ross Melvin Cain	115.493	
Boe	August Detonga Deiye	107.761	
Boe	Sam Billiam	103.423	
Boe	Isaaz Eobwaoin Aremwa	86.765	
Boe	Ikelani Ruthven Capelle	85.658	
Boe	Leslie Dogida Adam	79.799	
Boe	Invalid/blank votes	11	
Boe	Total votes cast	492	
Buada	Vinson Detenamo	144.040	Elected
Buada	Terangi Adam	128.461	Elected
Buada	Thomas Deideren Star	119.215	
Buada	Roland Kun	109.601	
Buada	Nelson De-Burma Tamakin	103.261	
Buada	Bomere Nicholas Depaune	88.463	
Buada	Trevor Bernicke	78.870	
Buada	Manfred Rabaima Depaune	73.342	
Buada	Invalid/blank votes	4	
Buada	Total votes cast	311	
Meneng	Dogabe Abner Jeremiah	298.602	Elected
Meneng	Nimrod Botelanga	294.555	Elected
Meneng	Sprent Dabwido	262.346	
Meneng	Rykers Solomon	187.351	
Meneng	Simpson Arthur Simon	159.706	
Meneng	Paul Aingimea	159.625	
Meneng	John Pandit Nehru Bop	155.999	
Meneng	Sire-Dee Demaure	147.897	
Meneng	Ralph Steven	133.143	
Meneng	Invalid/blank votes	19	
Meneng	Total votes cast	655	
Ubenide	David Adeang	255.723	Elected
Ubenide	Russell Kun	207.386	Elected
Ubenide	Fabian Ribauw	197.229	Elected
Ubenide	Derog Gioura	191.600	Elected
Ubenide	Valdon Dowiyogo	185.769	
Ubenide	Jesaulenko Keto Dowiyogo	173.413	
Ubenide	Robbie Robidok Detudamo	169.810	
Ubenide	Ellington Dowabobo	162.222	
Ubenide	Alf Diranga Itsimaera	157.914	
Ubenide	Aloysius Amwano	149.588	
Ubenide	Ekedu Rarube Angelica Itsimaera	141.184	
Ubenide	Joseph Hiram	138.367	
Ubenide	Renos Renige Ageage	133.271	
Ubenide	Dempsey Keppa	119.146	
Ubenide	Lui Eoaeo	115.419	
Ubenide	Francis Amram	114.263	
Ubenide	Cecilia Giouba	112.694	
Ubenide	Gwaine Gavin Dekarube	110.057	
Ubenide	Vincent Melvin Scotty	106.020	
Ubenide	Invalid/blank votes	43	
Ubenide	Total votes cast	829	
Yaren	Pres Nimes Ekwona	114.451	Elected
Yaren	Kieren Keke	113.300	Elected
Yaren	Leo Keke	97.900	
Yaren	Robert Ingitebo Eoe	95.153	
Yaren	Anthony Audoa	83.492	
Yaren	Terence Debao	75.393	
Yaren	Douglas Dogura Audoa	73.061	
Yaren	John Daegan Akubor	69.624	
Yaren	Antonius Jimwereiy	54.152	
Yaren	Johnny Tamuea Agadio	53.343	
Yaren	Brian Amwano	48.960	
Yaren	Morde Moses Neneiya	48.887	
Yaren	Allan Debao	48.584	
Yaren	Invalid/blank votes	20	
Yaren	Total votes cast	327	
Source: Republic of Nauru Government Gazette, 5 May 2003

== Presidential election ==
Following the election Parliament met to elect a new president but was unable to reach agreement. Godfrey Thoma was initially elected speaker but resigned the following day as the speaker initially did not get a vote in the presidential election. With parliament evenly split between supporters of former president Kinza Clodumar, Nauru First member David Adeang and Ludwig Scotty, nobody was then willing to be elected speaker. The deadlock continued for several weeks with calls for new elections to break the stalemate.

However towards the end of May the impasse was broken when 2 of the 3 factions reached agreement. As a result, Nauru First member Fabian Ribauw was elected speaker and in return Ludwig Scotty was able to get enough support to become president. On 29 May, Scotty was elected president on the second ballot by 10 votes to 7 for Kinza Clodumar.
