= Nauru national soccer team =

Team representing Nauru in men's international soccer competitions

Nauru
- Association: Nauru Soccer Federation (NSF)
- Confederation: N/A
- Head coach: Charlie Pomroy
- Home stadium: Naoero Sports Centre
- FIFA code: NRO

FIFA ranking
- Current: N/R

The Nauru national soccer team is a proposed national team to represent the Pacific island nation of Nauru in soccer. It is under the auspices of the Nauru Soccer Federation which is not a member of the OFC nor FIFA.

== History ==
Previously, Nauru had never played any official international matches. However, a Nauruan representative team had played twice, including a 2–1 victory over phosphate miners representing the Solomon Islands in 1994. The second match featured a Nauru selection playing refugees from the Nauru Regional Processing Centre at the Denig Stadium in 2014 in recognition of World Refugee Day.

In 2018, Capelle and Partner, a large retail store in Nauru represented the nation in a 7-a-side tournament, where they faced Kilipati, a representative team of Kiribati, who they beat 5-2. The tournament also included Kilipati B, Solomon Islands and Tuvalu, with Tuvalu recording a 3-1 win over the Solomon Islands and an 8-1 win over Kilipati B. A match between Iran and Tuvalu was also held at the Nauru Regional Processing Centre. All teams were selected from diaspora communities in Nauru.

After a long hiatus, the Nauru Soccer Association was relaunched in 2018. In 2020, the association’s vice-president, Kaz Cain, announced that Nauru was considering creating its first-ever official national side for a tournament in Hawaii in 2021. After issues caused by the COVID-19 pandemic, the association was relaunched in 2023 as the Nauru Soccer Federation under the Nauru Olympic Committee umbrella. The federation intended to build a grassroots soccer culture on the island and field its first-ever official national team.

In December 2023, Englishman Charlie Pomroy was appointed by Head of Nauru Soccer Federation Gareth Johnson as Nauru first-ever national team head coach.

In March 2024, the Nauru Soccer Federation announced that they had signed a deal with Stingz Sportswear, who had just designed and manufactured kits for Micronesia, to produce the Nauru jersey. Hong Kong-based Giordano International had also joined the project as the team's main sponsor, providing funding for the team's kits and matchday apparel. The kit design was expected to be announced in the weeks following the announcement, as Stingz and the NSF were finalizing a new logo for the federation.

Later that month, the association announced that it was in discussions with the Football Federation American Samoa to travel to the territory to face the American Samoa national team as part of a small friendly tournament. In addition to shirt sales, the federation planned to document the team's journey with a film similar to American Samoa's own Next Goal Wins. With enough funding, the team could afford to bring in players of Nauruan heritage from Australia to supplement the squad. On 14 March 2024, former Premier League striker Dave Kitson was announced as Nauru's first ever national team manager, in addition to a role as international ambassador.

After plans to play American Samoa were scrapped, discussions began with Reading XL FC about the team traveling to Nauru to be the nation's first opponent. The United Kingdom-based club was founded to improve the players' physical fitness. Reading XL FC then began fundraising for the trip with a goal of £50,000. In addition to setting up a GoFundMe, the club pursued other options, including a corporate sponsor and a documentary deal with a large television network. The planned match against Reading XL was cancelled as well due to financial reasons.

In an August 2026 interview with the Australian Broadcasting Corporation, Pomroy stated the Nauru Soccer Federation had stepped aside from public activity so that the Marshall Islands could enjoy the spotlight of its first match. The federation would now focus on building a grassroot culture on the island in hopes of playing the nation's first match by 2030. The goal is to field a team of homegrown players, rather than scouring the diaspora abroad. Pomroy also stated that they have been in contact with the Nauru Olympic Committee about adding football to the events at the 2028 Micronesian Games to be hosted in the country.

== Stadium ==
Currently under construction for the 2028 Micronesian Games, Nauru's national stadium will be the Naoero Sports Centre in the Meneng District’s interior plateau, also known as Topside. Previously, the home of soccer in Nauru was the Denig Stadium.

== Coaching staff ==
=== Current staff ===
Position	Name
Team manager	(England) Dave Kitson
Head coach	(England) Charlie Pomroy

=== Coaching history ===
- (England) Charlie Pomroy (2023–present)

== See also ==
- Nauru Soccer Federation
- Soccer in Nauru
