= Pyon Deiye =

Nauruan politician

The Honourable Pyon Deiye MP
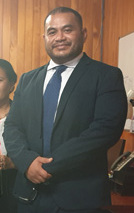

Member of the Nauruan Parliament for Anabar
- Incumbent
- Assumed office 2019
- Preceded by: Riddell Akua

Pyon Rohan Emage Rayham Deiye is a Nauruan politician.

== Career ==
Deiye was appointed as a trainee assistant flight service officer on 13 May 1996. He later became Director of Foreign Affairs Aid Coordinator. On 8 July 2006, Deiye was appointed as Acting Secretary for Foreign Affairs in the place of Jesaulenko Dowiyogo. Deiye later became Deputy Secretary for Foreign Affairs & Trade. He served as acting Secretary for Foreign Affairs & Trade in April 2008.

Dieye unsuccessfully ran for a seat in the Nauruan parliament in the 2016 election. Deiye was successfully elected to parliament in the Anabar constituency, alongside Maverick Eoe, in the 2019 election. On 28 August 2019, President Lionel Aingimea appointed Deieye as Deputy Minister for Health and Medical Services, Telecommunication and Media, as well as the Cenpac Corporation. Deiye was re-elected in the 2022 election. On 29 September 2022, President Russ Kun appointed Deiye as Minister for Media, Information and Communications Technology, the Nauru Rehabilitation Corporation, and the Nauru Fiber Cable Corporation.

== Personal life ==
Deiye is from the Ijuw District.
