= Gadabu =

Gadabu is a Nauruan surname. Notable individuals with the surname include:

- Raymond Gadabu (1921–1964), Nauruan politician
- Rennier Gadabu, Nauruan politician
