= Maverick Eoe =

Nauruan politician

The Honourable Maverick Eoe MP
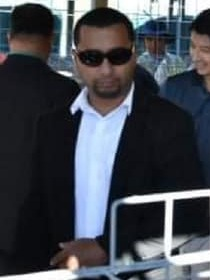

Member of the Nauruan Parliament for Anabar
- Incumbent
- Assumed office 2019
- Preceded by: Ludwig Scotty

Personal details
- Born: 26 March 1987 (age 39) Nauru

Maverick Eoe (born 26 March 1987) is a Nauruan politician.

== Career ==
Before entering politics, Eoe competed in powerlifting. In 2007, Eoe represented Nauru at the South Pacific Games. As of 2019, he was the Nauru Powerlifting Federation Secretary-General.

By 2017, Eoe worked as a pleader in the Office of the Solicitor General. In May 2019, he resigned his position to pursue politics. In the 2019 parliamentary election, Eoe was elected to represent the Anabar Constituency. He was elected alongside Pyon Deiye. They defeated long-serving members of parliament Ludwig Scotty and Riddell Akua. On 28 August, Eoe was appointed by President Lionel Aingimea as Minister for Justice and Border Control and as Minister for Sports. As sports minister, Eoe pushed Nauru's bid to host the Micronesian Games in 2026. In July 2022, it was announced by the Micronesian Games Council that Nauru would host the event in 2026. The same month, Eoe announced the construction of a new stadium in Nauru for the Micronesian Games.

Eoe was re-elected to parliament in the 2022 election. On 29 September, President Russ Kun appointed as Deputy Minister for Justice and the Cenpac Corporation. On 21 March 2023, President Kun revoked his previous appoints and appointed him as Deputy for Commerce and Business Development.

After President David Adeang was sworn in on 31 October 2023, Eoe took an oath of office for a deputy minister position.

=== Portfolios ===
==== Current ====
- Minister for Commerce & Foreign Investment — oversees commerce, business development, foreign investment, industry development, and related economic initiatives.
- Minister for Consumer Protection Authority — responsible for consumer protection and regulatory oversight in that area.
- Minister responsible for State Enterprises — responsible for government-owned enterprises and state commercial interests.

==== Former ====
- Minister for Justice & Border Control — Administration of laws, courts, and legal affairs and border security.
- Minister for Sports — Development of sports programs, athletes, and sporting organizations.

== Personal life ==
On 19 May 2006, Eoe and Gemmyma Notte, of the Uaboe District, became engaged. The couple married on 3 June 2006.
