= Clinton Benjamin =

Nauruan politician

The Honourable Clinton Benjamin MP

Member of the Nauruan Parliament for Boe
- In office 1992–1998
- Preceded by: Michael Aroi
- Succeeded by: Ross Cain

Personal details
- Born: 1951 or 1952
- Died: 13 March 2005 (aged 53)

Clinton Denton Benjamin (1951 or 1952 – 13 March 2005) was a Nauruan politician.

== Biography ==
Clinton Benjamin was born in either 1951 or 1952. He was of the Eamwitmwit tribe.

Benjamin became engaged to Maree Elizabeth Mwaredaga of the Meneng District on 21 January 1991. The couple married on 26 April 1991.

Benjamin unsuccessfully ran for the Parliament of Nauru, in the Boe Constituency in a by-election in March 1991. He ran unsuccessfully again in a by-election in August 1992. Benjamin was elected to parliament in the 1992 general election. He was re-elected in 1995. On 22 November 1995, Benjamin was appointed as minister for health by President Lagumot Harris. He served in President Harris's government, which lasted a year. He was appointed as minister for health again on 27 November 1996 by President Kennan Adeang. Benjmain was re-elected to parliament in 1997. In early 1998, Benjamin was dismissed parliamentary seat, along with four other MPs, by Speaker Adeang following criticism against the speaker. Benjamin was defeated for re-election in the resultant February 1998 by-election. He unsuccessfully ran for parliament in 2000, 2003, and 2004.

Benjamin died on 13 March 2005.
