= Jaden Dogireiy =

Nauruan politician

The Honourable Jaden Dogireiy MP

Member of the Nauruan Parliament for Anabar
- In office 2016–2019
- Preceded by: Ludwig Scotty
- Succeeded by: Ludwig Scotty

Personal details
- Born: 3 July 1977 (age 49) Nauru

Jaden Clint Bruno Dogireiy (born 3 July 1977) is a former opposition member of the Parliament of Nauru.

== Career ==
In the 2016 parliamentary election, Dogireiy was elected to represent the Anabar Constituency. Dogireiy served on the following committees: Constitutional Review, Privileges, Public Accounts, and Standing Orders. On 20 July 2016, Dogireiy was sworn in as assistant minister for Home Affairs, National Emergency Services, and the Nauru Utilities Corporation under President Baron Waqa. Dogireiy was a member of the opposition. On 3 February 2017, President Waqa stripped Dogireiy of the assistant home affairs ministership. On 30 March 2017, President Waqa revoked as well his positions as assistant minister for National Emergency Services and the Nauru Utilities Corporation.

Dogireiy was charged with assault. He was acquitted in the Magistrate's Court, but on appeal to the Supreme Court of Nauru, he was convicted by Judge Mohammed Khan, on 27 April 2019. He was sentenced to 13 months in prison, a sentence length which automatically disqualified him from holding a seat in parliament. On 30 May 2019, there was a by-election to fill the vacancy left by Dogireiy's disqualification, which was won by Ludwig Scotty.

He ran unsuccessfully in the 2025 parliamentary election.
