= Linkbelt Oval =

Stadium in Nauru

Coordinates: 0°32′4″S 166°54′43″E

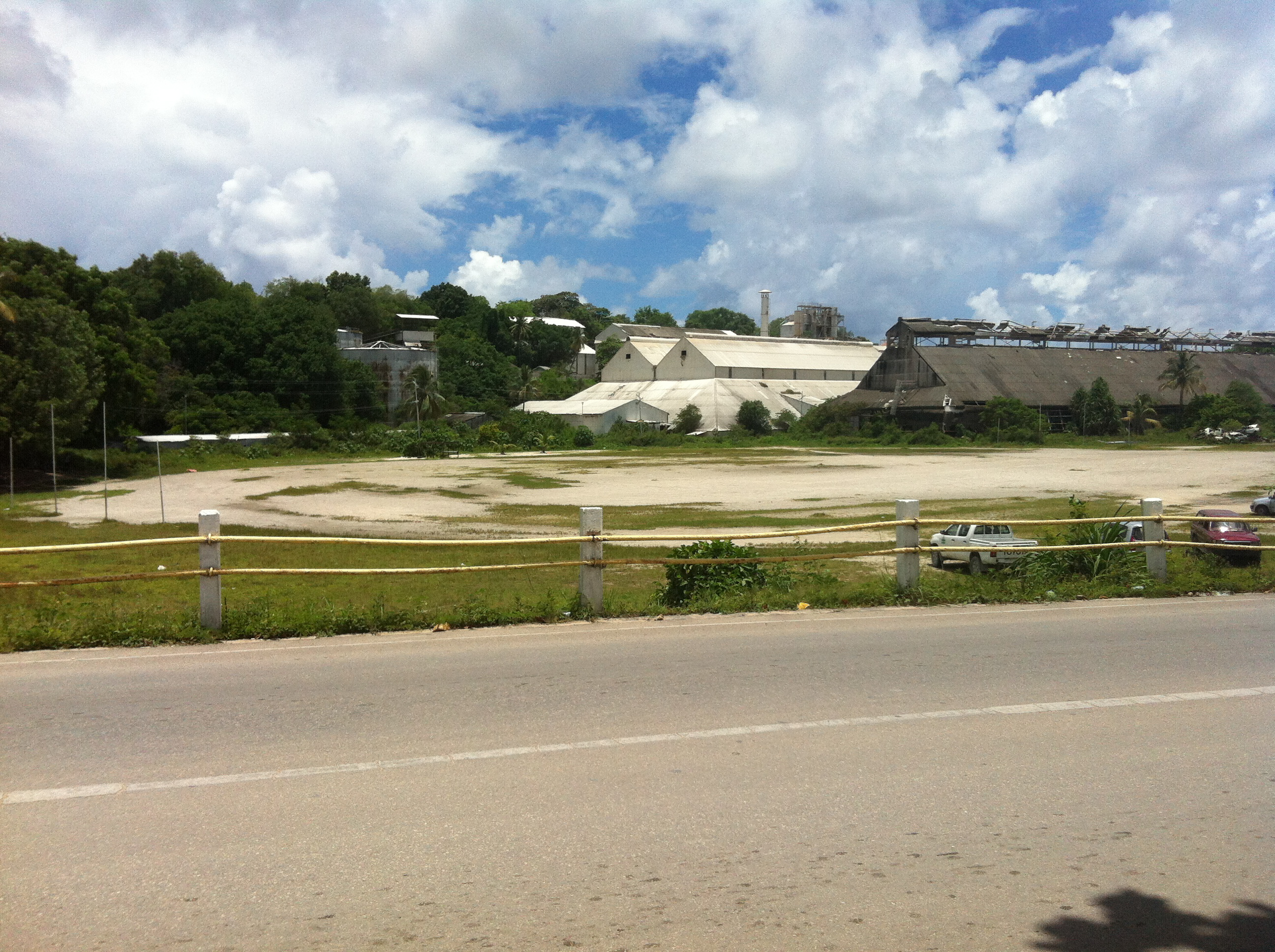
- Interactive map of Linkbelt Oval
- Location: Aiwo, Nauru
- Owner: Government of Nauru
- Operator: Nauru Australian Football Association
- Surface: Gravel

Construction
- Groundbreaking: 1924
- Built: 1924
- Opened: 1924

Tenant
- Nauru Australian Football Association

Linkbelt Oval is a stadium on the island nation of Nauru. It is located in Aiwo and was constructed by the Nauru Phosphate Corporation. It is also called the Aida Oval, because Aida, one of the athletic organizations in Nauru, holds its competitions and trainings here. 1,000-capacity Denig Stadium, which hosted games of soccer, used to be another main sports venue in Nauru.

== Overview ==
A map of Nauru showing the location of Linkbelt Oval

Because of its age and rough playing surface, it is generally not suitable for international requirements. The Linkbelt Oval hosts Australian rules football matches. The stadium holds the offices of the Nauru Australian Football Association (NAFA), which organized the games of the national championships and the national team. The visitor attendance record lies at 3,000 spectators, which was achieved during the championship finals in 1999.

It consists of a playing field and small grandstands. The structure is named after a company, which was earlier involved in the excavation of phosphates. Additionally, the team named after the power station, the Menaida Tigers, was known by the name "Linkbelt."

There is no grass growing in the stadium; the playing surface is comprised completely of phosphate dust. The motto of the NAFA is "The hard men of football".

== Gallery ==
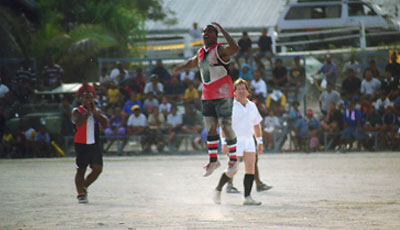

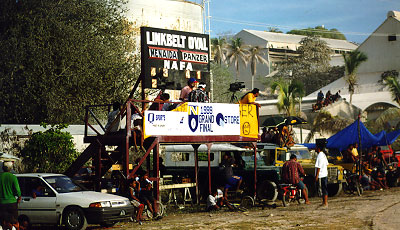

== See also ==
- Australian rules football in Nauru
- New Nauru Stadium
- Meneñ Stadium
