= Denig Stadium =

Stadium in Nauru

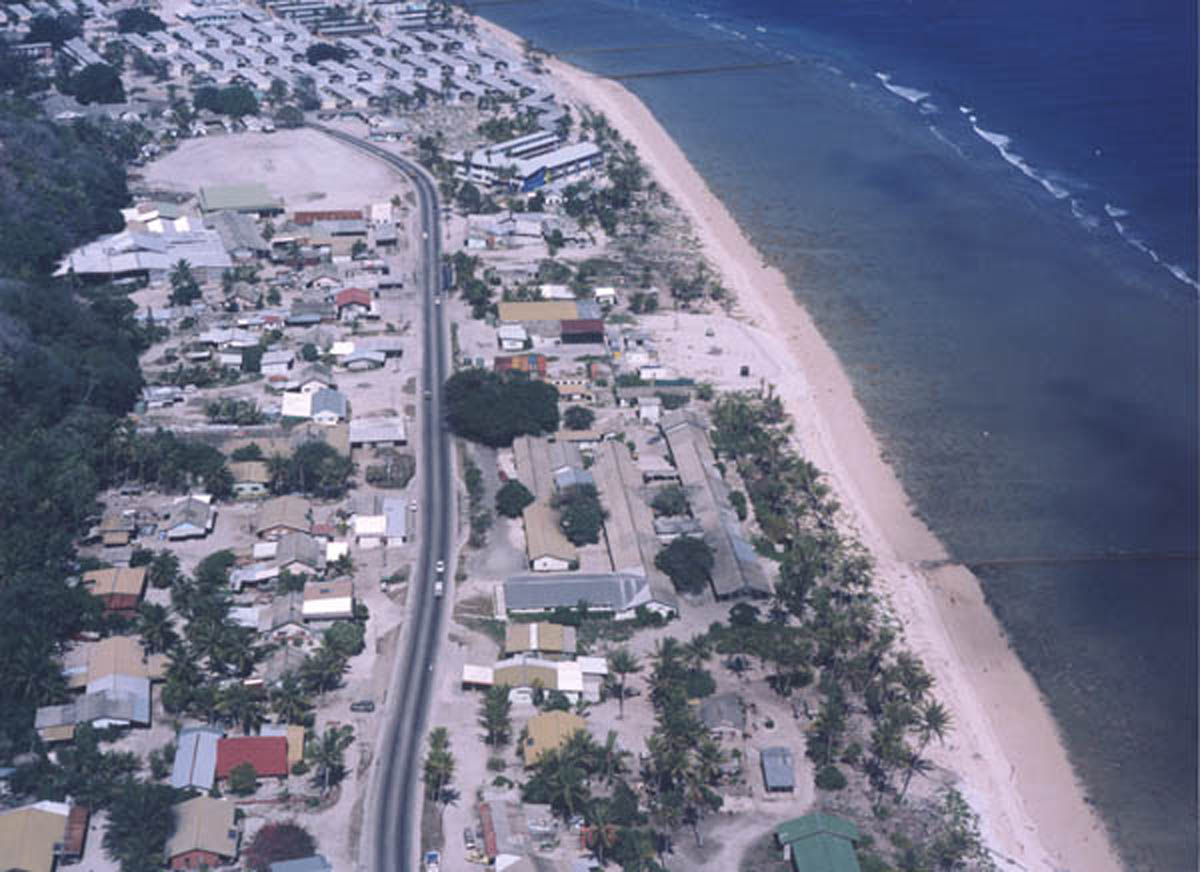
- Interactive map of Denig Stadium
- Location: Nibok, Nauru
- Coordinates: 0.52000°S 166.92000°E
- Capacity: 1,000
- Surface: Gravel

Tenant
- Nauru national soccer team (formerly)

Denig Stadium is a soccer stadium on the island nation of Nauru. It is located in Nibok and has a capacity of 1,000 spectators. The stadium is at times unusable as it is also used as a storage area for shipping containers.

== History ==
The stadium hosted soccer in Nauru until 2004, the last time an organized league was played on the island. The six-team league which played out of the stadium was dissolved after the foreign workers of the Nauru Phosphate Corporation left the country.

A Nauru team played a friendly against a refugees team from the Nauru Regional Processing Centre at the stadium in front of dozens of spectators. The association football match took place on 20 June 2014 in celebration of World Refugee Day.

The stadium was proposed as a host venue in Nauru's unsuccessful bid to host the 2017 Pacific Mini Games. As part of the proposal, the stadium was to be resurfaced for rugby training.

== See also ==
- Linkbelt Oval
- Meneñ Stadium
- New Nauru Stadium
