= The Secret Footballer =

Pseudonymous identity of a footballer and journalist

The Secret Footballer is the pseudonym of a former Premier League footballer who contributed to many articles to The Guardian newspaper and has written five books, I Am The Secret Footballer, Tales From The Secret Footballer, The Secret Footballer's Guide to the Modern Game, The Secret Footballer: Access All Areas, and How to Win: Lessons from the Premier League. Some of these are memoirs.

The Secret Footballer is English, has played for at least two Premier League clubs and was once relegated on the last day of the season. He grew up on a rural council estate and was a late starter in organised football. He signed his first professional contract aged 21. He was still playing as late as 2011.

He says he considered suicide after the end of his career but his writing steered him away from alcohol abuse. He says he wants to reveal his identity but fears being sued for the content of his work.

Former Reading and Stoke City striker Dave Kitson has been written about as being a 'leading contender' as The Secret Footballer. It was confirmed in a podcast in February 2026, by Dave Kitson, that he was The Secret Footballer.

== Bibliography ==
- The Secret Footballer: Access All Areas (Guardian Faber, 2015)
- The Secret Footballer's Guide to the Modern Game: Tips and Tactics from the Ultimate Insider (Guardian Faber, 2014)
- Tales From The Secret Footballer (Guardian Faber, 2013)
- I Am The Secret Footballer: Lifting the Lid on the Beautiful Game (Guardian Faber, 2012)
- How to Win: Lessons from the Premier League (Guardian Faber, 2017)
