= Ross Cain =

Nauruan politician (1957–2011)

The Honourable Ross Cain MP

Speaker of the Parliament of Nauru
- In office 13 March 2003 – 6 May 2003
- Preceded by: Vassal Gadoengin
- Succeeded by: Godfrey Thoma

Member of the Nauruan Parliament for Boe
- In office 1998–2003
- Preceded by: Clinton Benjamin
- Succeeded by: Baron Waqa

Personal details
- Born: 2 January 1957
- Died: 5 January 2011 (aged 54)

Ross Melvin Cain (2 January 1957 – 5 January 2011) was a Nauruan politician. He served a speaker of parliament in 2003.

== Biography ==
Ross Cain was born on 2 January 1957. He was a member of the Iruwa tribe.

Cain was elected to the Parliament of Nauru in a by-election in the Boe Constituency held on 21 February 1998. He was re-elected in the 2000 election. Following this election, René Harris was re-elected as president. Ludwig Scotty was elected as speaker of parliament and Cain was elected as deputy speaker. On 18 April, Scotty and Cain resigned from their positions as speaker and deputy speaker respectively, as a result of a factional divide led by President Harris and former president Bernard Dowiyogo. The two were re-elected on 19 April.

On 1 June 2001, President Harris appointed Cain as minister for works and home affairs. On 19 June, Harris additionally appointed Cain as minister for foreign affairs. On 20 June, acting president Aloysius Amwano additionally appointed Cain as minister for health, sports, justice, and natural resources.

President Harris was ousted by Dowiyogo in January 2003. Cain had lost his ministerial appointments under President Dowiyogo. Vassal Gadoengin, who was elected speaker in 2002, resigned in January 2003. On 12 March 2003, after nearly two months of stalemate in the parliament, Cain was elected speaker. He took office on 13 March. On 27 March, as speaker, Cain dissolved the Fourteenth Parliament of the Republic of Nauru. He was defeated for re-election in the resultant 2003 parliamentary election.

Cain died on 5 January 2011.
