= Reading XL FC =

Reading XL
- Full name: Reading XL Football Club
- Nickname(s): XL FC
- Founded: 2022; 3 years ago
- Owner: Chris Broadhurst
- Manager: Chris Broadhurst
- League: N/A
- Website: http://www.readingxlfc.co.uk/
Home colours

Reading XL FC, commonly known as Reading XL or simply XLFC, is a non-professional football club based in Reading, England. The club was established in 2022 to help overweight and obese men losing weight through playing football. It is the first of many XLFC clubs in the United Kingdom.

== History ==
The club was founded in 2022. The club plays matches against other weight-loss football clubs, some of which are posted onto the team's YouTube channel.

In 2024, the club was invited to play a friendly match against the Nauru national team, the team currently managed by former Reading player Dave Kitson, who played as a striker in the Premier League. The club accepted the invited and is fundraising to travel to Nauru for Nauru's first ever international football match. Nauru is the most obese country in the world, with most of its population being obese and diabetes being a major problem on the island.

== Eligibility ==
Like other clubs, Reading XL players are required to have an initial body mass index (BMI) of at least 27 in order to register.
