= Remy Namaduk =

Nauruan politician (born 1949)

Remy Gerard Namaduk (born 1949) is a Nauruan politician and former member of the cabinet and member of parliament.

Namaduk unsuccessfully ran for Parliament of Nauru in 1986, 1992, and 1995.

Namaduk was elected to parliament in the by-election in Anetan Constituency held on 5 October 1996. He was re-elected in 1997, 2000, and 2003.

He held several portfolios in the cabinets of René Harris, including Minister of Education and Minister for Economic Development and Minister for Transport and Telecommunications. He served as Minister Assisting the President of Nauru in all of the cabinets of René Harris between 1999 and 2003. He also served as Minister of Finance several times between 1999 and 2003.

Namaduk was ousted from his parliament seat in the 2004 election by Vassal Gadoengin. He unsuccessfully ran again in the elections of 2007, 2008 and April 2010.
