= Anibare Bay =

Bay in Nauru

Coordinates: 0°32′01″S 166°57′20″E

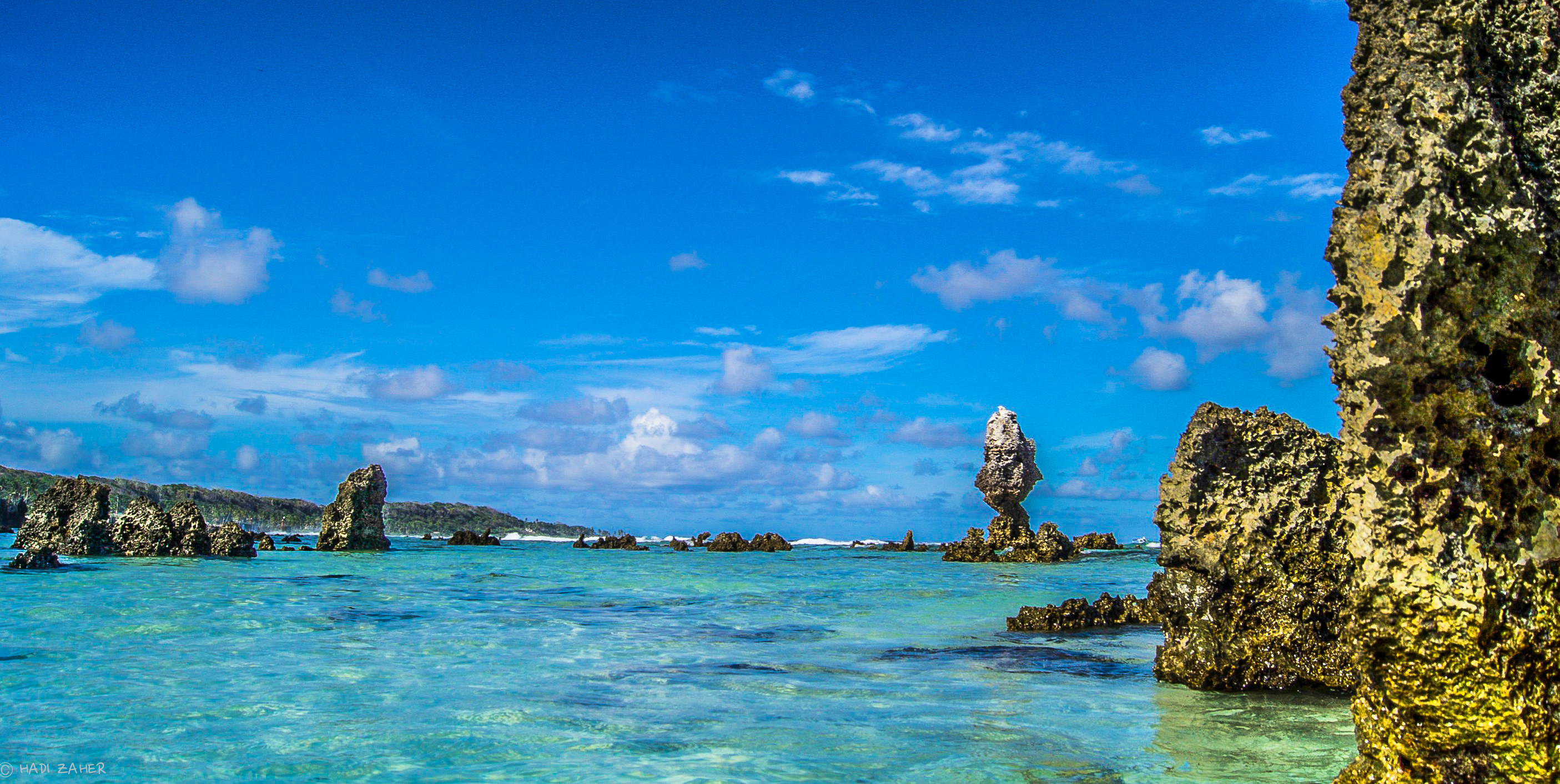
- Coral formations in Anibare Bay
- Interactive map of Anibare Bay
- Location: Anibare, Nauru
- Type: Bay
- Basin countries: Nauru

Anibare Bay is a large bay located in the Anibare district of eastern Nauru, a small island nation located in Oceania.

== Physical features ==
It is bordered by capes to the north and south, in the Ijuw and Meneng districts respectively.

The Anibare Beach is in excess of two kilometers long.

Anibare Bay was formed by the underwater collapse of the east side of the volcano that underlies Nauru. A large arc shaped block slid away from the side of Nauru and rotated out. This block extends to about 1100 m below sea level, with rough bulging landslide deposits down to 2000 m below sea level.

=== Natural ripcurrent hazards ===
While Anibare Bay is popular with tourists that happen to visit Nauru and naturalists, it can be at times dangerous owing to frequent heavy surf and the presence of rip currents.

== Anibare Bay Escarpment Important Bird Area ==
The Anibare Bay escarpment is a line of wooded cliffs overlooking the bay. It ranges in gradient from vertical cliffs to gradually sloping areas, and contains the richest remaining native vegetation on the island. It forms a 35 ha site which has been recognised as an Important Bird Area (IBA) by BirdLife International because it is reported to hold the highest density of endemic Nauru reed warblers on the island, as well as supporting tree-nesting seabirds such as black noddies. It is likely to be a nesting site for Micronesian imperial pigeons, if any still remain.

== Noted industries ==
Noted industries include the government-owned Menen Hotel, and Anibare Harbour, an artificial commercial fishing area which was created in 2000.

Anibare Beach Resort Tourism Development was proposed and approved on 24 Aug 2021. The project is meant to boost hospitality and tourism and income growth for Nauru. The planning is managed and supervised by GIP and led by CEO Troy Spenser.

== See also ==
- Anibare District#Tourism
