= Nauru Rehabilitation Corporation =

To rehabilitate land destroyed by the phosphate industry in Nauru

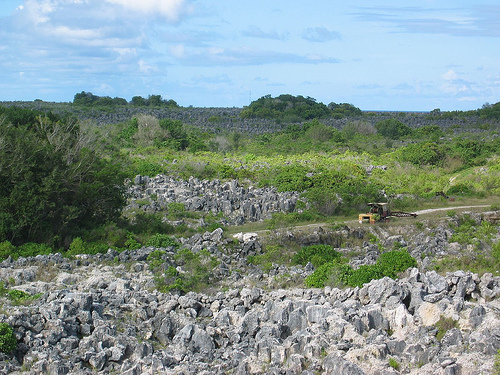
Jagged rocks left behind after phosphate mining on Nauru.

The Nauru Rehabilitation Corporation is a state-owned enterprise established by the Republic of Nauru in May 1999, following the passing of the Nauru Rehabilitation Corporation Act in July 1997. Its primary mission is to rehabilitate land destroyed by the phosphate industry, both before and after its independence, making them once again economically useful to the small island-nation.

== History ==
Work on the lands began in early 2008 with the help of Australian funding. Australia, during its trusteeship over the island until 1968, had mined and profited from the rich phosphate deposits of the island. Once independent, however, Nauru took Australia to the courts demanding financial reparations for the environmental and agricultural damages caused by the mining operations. The Australian government under Prime Minister Paul Keating agreed to assist Nauru in an out-of-court settlement in the 1990s, signing a treaty to that effect with the then President of Nauru, Bernard Dowiyogo. The Nauru Rehabilitation Corporation (NRC) was set up to put the necessary work into effect.

== Work ==
The work currently involves breaking and crushing the jagged rock formations left behind by phosphate mining. The crushed rock contains some proportion of mineable phosphate and some parts of the rock is also sold to the construction industry, but the main aim of activity is to clear the holes dug by the phosphate industry. Subsequently, a layer of arable soil is supposed to cover the land, allowing for the growth of vegetation.

Between 2007 and 2018, the NRC was in charge of the extraction of phosphate from remaining unmined areas. However, slow progress meant that the responsibility was given back to RONPHOS in July 2018.

== CEO ==
The NRC's CEO is Vinci Clodumar. In addition, its operations are the responsibility of the Department of State. The minister responsible for the NRC at its foundation was Frederick Pitcher. Since mid-November 2011, following a change in government, it is David Adeang.

== See also ==
- History of Nauru
- Economy of Nauru
- British Phosphate Commission
- Nauru Phosphate Corporation
- Nauru Rehabilitation Corporation Website
