= RONPhos =

Nauruan company

- RONPhos Logo
- Type: State-owned enterprise
- Founded: 2005; 21 years ago
- Headquarters: Nauru
- Key people: Rennier Gadabu (MP); Newman Rykers (chairman)
- Products: Phosphate mining
- Website: http://ronphos.com.au/

RONPhos, abbreviated from Republic of Nauru Phosphate Corporation is a government-owned company controlling phosphate mining in Nauru. The company was previously known as the Nauru Phosphate Corporation (NPC).

On 1 July 1970, the ownership and management of Nauru's phosphate was transferred from the British Phosphate Commission (BPC) to the Nauru Phosphate Corporation.

== Failed investments ==
In the early years of the Nauru Phosphate Royalties Development Trust, it financed the construction of two of five high-rise luxury condos in Hawaii (on the island of Oahu). The five towers (two completed as of October 2005) are on prime Honolulu real estate with ocean views and represent a benchmark in Honolulu luxury high-rises. Other investments included Nauru House in Melbourne and Hawaiki Tower in Honolulu. These luxury properties were only part of an international real estate portfolio that stretched into countries including Australia, the Philippines, Fiji, Guam, Samoa, the US, New Zealand, and the United Kingdom.

Financial mismanagement and extravagant government spending (i.e., investing A$4 million in a London play, Leonardo the Musical: A Portrait of Love, about Leonardo da Vinci's love life which flopped after weeks of bad reviews) led to increased spending—and increased loans—which were levied upon the real estate holdings of the Nauru Phosphate Royalties Trust. One loan, of A$236 million from General Electric, which was used as a loan to pay off all other loans, could not be paid back by the government. This led to GE seizing Nauru's international real estate developments, including the trademark Nauru House in Australia.

== 2002–present ==
Following the collapse of phosphate mining in 2002 due to the virtual exhaustion of financially viable resources, repatriation of many foreign workers began. From 2004 to 2005, foreign workers were reduced from 1,478 to 470. Most of the workers were from Kiribati and Tuvalu.

On 1 July 2005, during a managerial restructuring, the Nauru Phosphate Corporation formally changed its name to the Republic of Nauru Phosphate Corporation to signal change. Today, RONPhos currently employs 20.4% of the working population of Nauru.

Although the initial layer of phosphate has been mined out (approximately 100 million tonnes), a secondary level of phosphate is believed to exist, holding nearly 20 million tonnes of minable resources. RONPhos is beginning to develop plans for its economical extraction.

== See also ==
- British Phosphate Commission
- Economy of Nauru
- Nauru Phosphate Royalties Trust
- Linkbelt Oval
