= Rennier Gadabu =

Nauruan politician

Rennier Stanislaus Gadabu
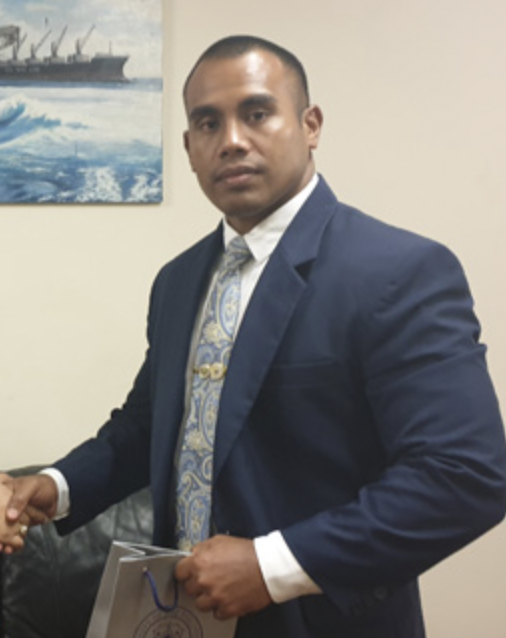

Minister for Commerce, Industry & Environment; Climate Change; and Infrastructure Development
- Incumbent
- Assumed office 28 August 2019

Member of the Nauruan Parliament for Aiwo
- Incumbent
- Assumed office 2019
- Preceded by: Aaron Cook

Rennier Stanislaus Gadabu is a Nauruan politician elected to the Parliament of Nauru during the 2019 elections, held on August 24, 2019.

He represents the Aiwo Constituency and was elected with 368 votes. Following his election to Parliament, Gadabu was appointed by newly elected President Lionel Aingimea to serve in his administration as Minister for Commerce, Industry & Environment; Climate Change; and Infrastructure Development on 28 August 2019.

He is a graduate of the University of the South Pacific. He previously served as First Secretary at the Permanent Mission of the Republic of Nauru to the United Nations in New York.

On 25 October 2023, parliament passed a vote of no confidence against President Russ Kun. The same day, parliament unsuccessfully attempted to elect a new president. The two nominees were the opposition MP David Adeang and the government MP Gadabu. The ballot was evenly split nine-nine each time. Speaker Marcus Stephen then called for a new presidential vote to be held on 30 October.
