= Meneñ Stadium =

Former stadium in Nauru

Coordinates: 0°32′26″S 166°55′49″E

- Interactive map of Meneñ Stadium
- Location: Meneng, Nauru
- Capacity: 3,500
- Surface: Grass

Construction
- Opened: 2006

Meneñ Stadium, also spelled Meneng, is a former stadium on the island Nauru. It is located in the Meneng district. Constructed in 2006, it had a capacity of 3,500 spectators. Unlike other stadiums on the island, Meneñ Stadium had bleachers for spectators.

== History ==
A map of Nauru showing the location of Meneñ Stadium

The area, a large empty sports field, was converted by the Australian Government into a containment area for asylum seekers under the Pacific Solution. At its place is the Nauru Australian Immigration Detention Center (Nauru Regional Processing Centre), which had a small soccer field in the facility.

As part of Nauru's unsuccessful bid to host the 2017 Pacific Mini Games, the Meneng stadium complex was to be upgraded to include tiered seating for 10,000 spectators, reclaiming land that was previously damaged by phosphate mining.

== See also ==
- Denig Stadium
- Linkbelt Oval
- New Nauru Stadium
