= Topside (Nauru) =

Plateau in Nauru

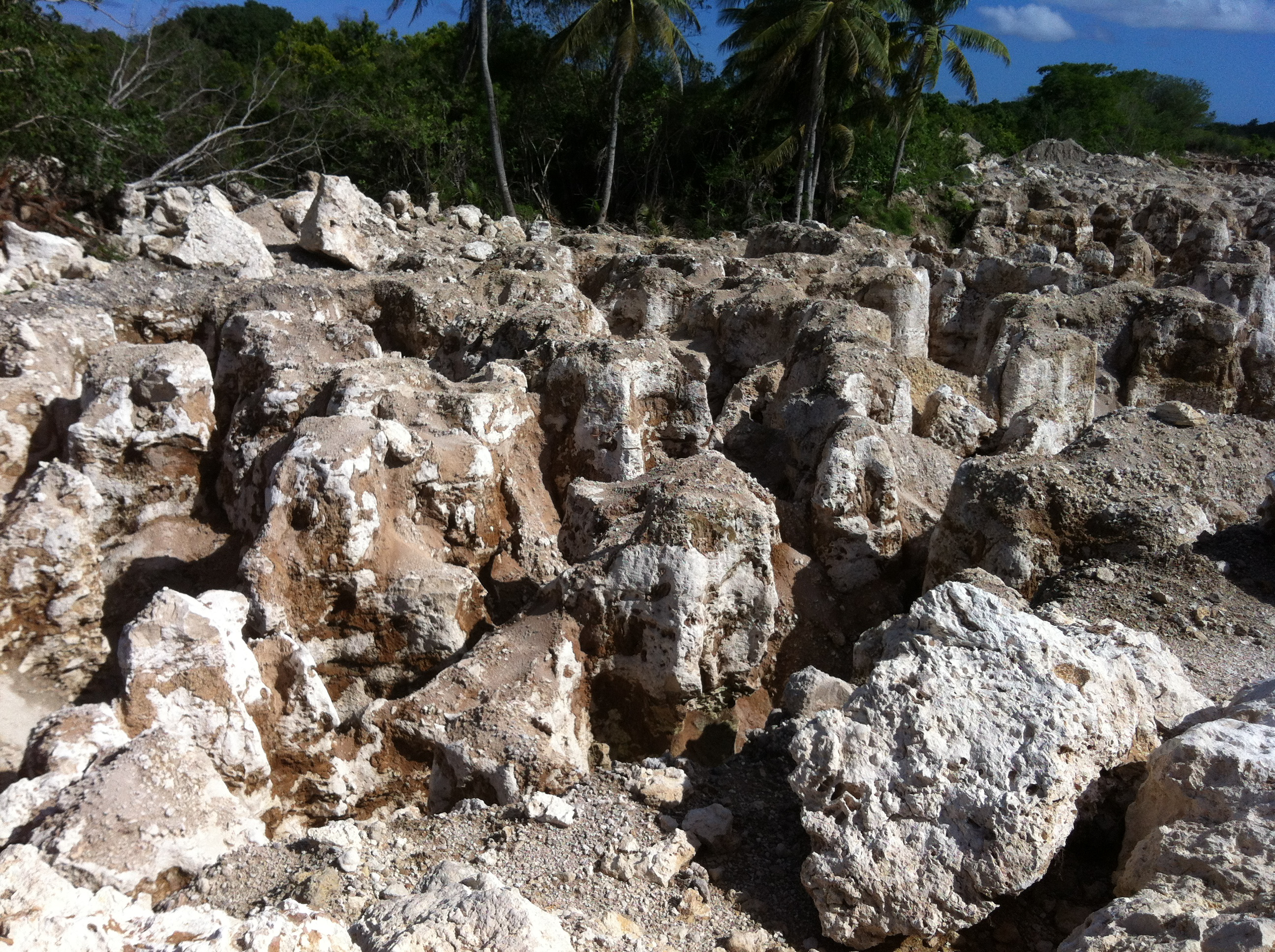
Typical Topside landscape as a result of phosphate mining

Topside is the name given to the high plateau that comprises the inland portion of the Pacific island nation of Nauru. Its geography is characterized by calcium carbonate pinnacles that make the land unsuitable for agriculture or forestry. These pillars of rock are what remains after the island's history of phosphate mining which decimated the landscape. Today the area is the focal point of the Government of Nauru's Higher Ground Initiative which would see the island's land restored so that the country's population can move inland to escape the effects of climate change and rising sea levels.
