= 2028 Micronesian Games =

International multi-sport event

XI Micronesian Games
- Country: Nauru
- Nations: 8 (anticipated)
- Opening: January 14, 2028
- Closing: January 23, 2028
- Main venue: New Nauru Stadium

The 11th Micronesian Games will be held in 2028 in Nauru. Nauru was selected as first-time hosts for the competition in July 2022.

== History ==
Originally scheduled for 2026, the Micronesian Games were moved to January 2028 because of delays in the construction of the New Nauru Stadium and to allow the games to be part of Nauru's celebration of its 60th anniversary of independence.

== Sports ==
The events of the games are still to be determined. In July 2024, it was stated that the final sporting disciplines would be announced within the next twelve months.
