= Dave Kitson =

English football player and manager (born 1980)

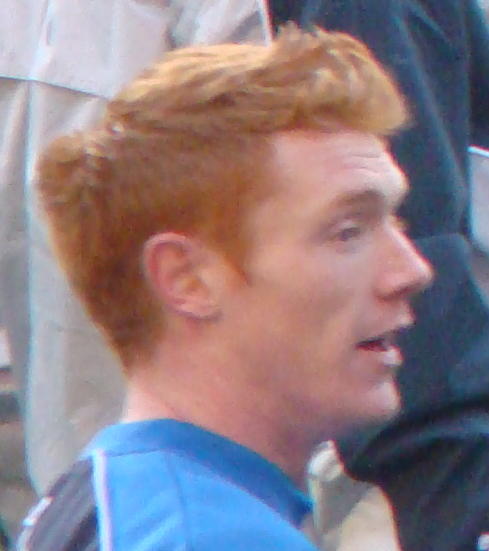
- Kitson warming up for Reading in 2008

Personal information
- Full name: David Barry Kitson
- Date of birth: 21 January 1980 (age 46)
- Place of birth: Hitchin, England
- Height: 6 ft 3 in (1.91 m)
- Position: Forward

Team information
- Current team: Maidenhead United Women (manager)

Youth career
- –1997: Hitchin Town

Senior career*
Years	Team	Apps	(Gls)
1997–2000	Hitchin Town	2	(0)
2000–2001	Arlesey Town		
2001–2003	Cambridge United	102	(40)
2003–2008	Reading	135	(54)
2008–2010	Stoke City	34	(3)
2009	→ Reading (loan)	10	(2)
2009	→ Middlesbrough (loan)	6	(3)
2010–2012	Portsmouth	68	(12)
2012–2013	Sheffield United	33	(11)
2013–2014	Oxford United	32	(4)
2014–2015	Arlesey Town	0	(0)
Total		422	(129)

Managerial career
- 2025–: Maidenhead United Women
- * Club domestic league appearances and goals

David Barry Kitson (born 21 January 1980) is an English former professional footballer.

Kitson began his career with non-league Hitchin Town and Arlesey Town before he joined Cambridge United in 2001 and became one of the brightest prospects in the Third Division, which led to him being signed by Reading in 2003 for a fee of £150,000.

He was part of Reading's Championship title winning team that gained promotion to the Premier League for the first time in 2006, with a record 106 points. After two seasons in the top flight Reading were relegated and Kitson signed for Stoke City for a club record fee of £5.5 million.

He had loan spells with Reading and Middlesbrough before joining Portsmouth. He spent two seasons at Fratton Park but his contract with Portsmouth was cancelled in August 2012 with the club in danger of being liquidated, and he subsequently joined Sheffield United on a short term deal, before signing a two-year contract at Oxford United in June 2013.

== Playing career ==
=== Cambridge United ===
After playing non-league football for Hitchin Town and Arlesey Town, Kitson joined Cambridge United, then in Division Two, in 2001 after being recommended by agent Barry Silkman to U's manager John Beck.

He made his debut in 3–2 victory away over Stoke City on 17 March 2001. On the final day of the same season, Kitson notched his first goal for the club in a 1–1 draw at Swansea City.

The following season saw the club relegated from League One but Kitson scored 10 goals, finishing as the club's second-top goalscorer, one behind Tom Youngs.

In the 2002–03 season, Kitson scored 25 goals, falling two goals short of David Crown's club record of 27 goals in a season. After 11 goals in 19 appearances at the start of the 2003–04 season, Kitson left to join Reading, having scored 47 goals in 123 appearances in all competitions for Cambridge.

=== Reading ===
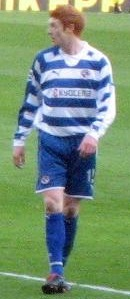
Kitson playing for Reading

Kitson was sold to Reading on 26 December 2003, for a fee of £150,000.

He scored five goals in 10 starts in his first season. In the 2005–06 season, despite injury he went on to record an impressive goals-to-game ratio, and continued to do so as Reading won the Championship title with a record 106 points.

Following promotion with Reading, Kitson scored the club's first Premier League goal in their 3–2 home win against Middlesbrough on the opening day of the 2006–07 season, but was then badly injured later in the same match. The injury kept him out of the game until Reading's FA Cup victory over Birmingham City on 27 January 2007.

On 27 March 2007, he committed his future to Reading, signing a new deal until June 2010.

In Reading's first Premier League game of the 2007–08 season, Kitson was sent off less than a minute after coming on as a substitute against Manchester United at Old Trafford, for a challenge on Patrice Evra.

=== Stoke City ===
On 18 July 2008, Kitson moved in a £5.5m move from Reading to Stoke City, breaking Stoke's record transfer fee.

Speculation soon arose as to whether Kitson was settled at Stoke, as he struggled to adapt to the side's style of play after being played out of position by manager Tony Pulis.

As a result, he failed to score any goals in any of the 18 competitive games he played for Stoke City in the 2008–09 season.

Chairman Peter Coates and Pulis denied any rumour that he might be leaving the Britannia Stadium. He rejoined Reading on loan until the end of the 2008–09 season on 10 March 2009.

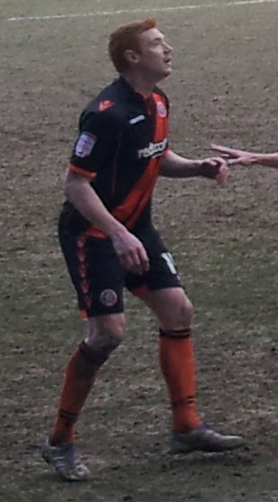
Dave Kitson playing for Sheffield United in March 2013

Kitson later revealed that he made the "wrong decision" in joining Stoke, adding that he and his family were happy at Reading and that "I threw all of that away for what I thought was going to be a new challenge... I hold my hands up – it was my fault. I made the decision to go to Stoke, I didn't have to, no-one forced me to go, and it was a bad decision."

Addressing his lack of goals for Stoke, he said "I'd been bought for a lot of money but I wasn't sure I was being utilised in the way I thought I was going to be... You do have some days at training when you go back in and wonder what you're doing there."

However, Reading failed to gain promotion, meaning that Kitson returned to Stoke. Kitson stated that he would "start his Stoke career again".

His first competitive goal for Stoke came in a 1–0 League Cup win at Leyton Orient on 26 August 2009.

He scored his first league goal for Stoke on 29 August 2009, which proved to be the winning goal against Sunderland and then scored again with a goal against Bolton Wanderers.

However Kitson lost his place to James Beattie and joined Middlesbrough on a two-month loan.

He scored his first goals for Middlesbrough when he scored a brace against Peterborough United on 28 November 2009.

He returned to Stoke on 1 January 2010. He scored in the FA Cup against Manchester City and Bolton Wanderers.

=== Portsmouth ===
Kitson joined Portsmouth with Liam Lawrence on deadline day as part of a deal which saw Marc Wilson join Stoke City. Kitson made his Portsmouth debut on 11 September 2010 in a 0–0 draw with Ipswich at Fratton Park. He scored his first goal for the club in a 4–1 defeat at Crystal Palace on 14 September 2010 and a further 2 goals in a 6–1 win over Leicester at Fratton Park on 24 September 2010. In his first season, Kitson made 39 appearances and scored 8 goals.

In his second season, Kitson was frequently left out of the squad, before Steve Cotterill left the club to become manager of Nottingham Forest. Kitson experienced a dip in form and was dropped to the bench by Cotterill's successor Michael Appleton. Kitson registered his first Portsmouth goal since October 2011 at Doncaster Rovers with a 90th minute equaliser, before Márkó Futács scored in stoppage time to secure a 4-3 win, which kept Portsmouth in the division for at least one more week and confirmed Doncaster's relegation. Kitson left the club in August 2012.

=== Sheffield United ===
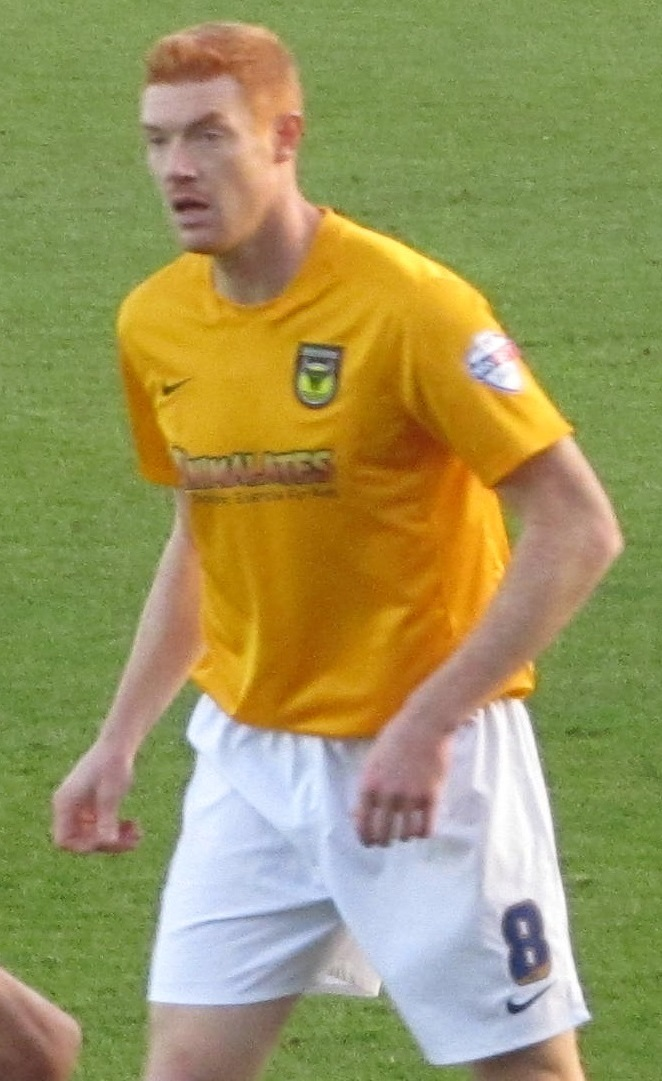
Kitson playing for Oxford United in 2013

On 31 August 2012, Kitson joined Sheffield United on a short-term deal. He made his debut on 15 September 2012, coming on as a second-half substitute in the 1–1 draw with Bury. His first goal for the Blades came in a 1–1 draw against Notts County at Bramall Lane on 29 September 2012.

On 16 November 2012 Kitson extended his contract until the end of the season, stating that "It wouldn't have sat comfortably with me to leave a job half done after integrating myself into a great squad... I still would like to go to America but we will revisit that at a later date because the aim is to have a good crack at winning promotion here."

Kitson played regularly for the remainder of the season, making 37 appearances in total and scoring 11 goals, but with the Blades failing to gain promotion he was released when his contract expired in June 2013.

=== Oxford United ===
On 27 June 2013, Kitson joined League Two club Oxford United, signing a two-year contract. He scored four league goals in his only season at the club. On 22 July 2014 Kitson announced his decision to retire from playing professional football.

=== Return to Arlesey Town ===
In December 2014, Kitson returned to Arlesey Town, but left in February 2015.

== Coaching career ==
Kitson launched The Dave Kitson Academy in October 2023, but it was dissolved in April 2025.

In March 2024, it was announced that Kitson was set to manage the Nauru national team for their first ever game. Then, in June 2024, it was announced that he was planning for Nauru to take on Reading XL, a team made up of overweight footballers based in Reading, in the nation's first game. However, Kitson's role with Nauru and the game against Reading XL did not materialise.

In June 2025, it was announced that Kitson had been appointed as manager of Maidenhead United Women.

== Personal life ==
Kitson was born in Hitchin, Hertfordshire and worked for Sainsbury's as a shelf stacker prior to becoming a professional footballer.

In 2008, Kitson was arrested and subsequently banned from driving for 18 months after failing to provide a breath test.

Kitson caused controversy in December 2018 when, during a Talksport interview, he said that "players make themselves a target" following racist abuse of Raheem Sterling. Tyrone Mings pulled out of a planned TalkSport interview in protest at Kitson's comments.

In May 2020, Kitson came in for criticism following his announcement that he wanted to become chief executive of the Professional Footballers' Association, with the chairman of Kick It Out questioning his anti-racism credentials and three black players attacking the former Reading striker for his comments about Sterling.

He has revealed that he wanted to give up playing football in his 20s and believes he should have retired after being part of the Reading side that won promotion to the Premier League in 2006. He said: "I should have stopped right there and then. I would have been a much happier person." He also admitted that he "still takes an awful lot of medication to get through the day".

In February 2026 he revealed himself as the former Premier League player behind The Secret Footballer series of Guardian columns and books. Rumours and speculation that Kitson was the Secret Footballer had been circulating for many years and he had been thought of as the 'Leading Contender'..

== Career statistics ==
Appearances and goals by club, season and competition
Club	Season	League			FA Cup		League Cup		Other		Total	
Club	Season	Division	Apps	Goals	Apps	Goals	Apps	Goals	Apps	Goals	Apps	Goals
Hitchin Town	1997–98	Isthmian League Premier Division	2	0	0	0	—		1 (Note: Appearance in East Anglian Cup)	0	3	0
Hitchin Town	1998–99	Isthmian League First Division	0	0	0	0	—		3 (Note: Two appearances in Isthmian League Cup, one appearance in Herts Senior Cup)	0	3	0
Hitchin Town	Total		2	0	0	0	—		4	0	6	0
Cambridge United	2000–01	Second Division	8	1	0	0	0	0	0	0	8	1
Cambridge United	2001–02	Second Division	33	9	2	0	1	0	4 (Note: Appearances in Football League Trophy)	1	41	10
Cambridge United	2002–03	Third Division	44	20	6	1	2	1	4	3	55	25
Cambridge United	2003–04	Third Division	17	10	1	1	1	0	0	0	19	11
Cambridge United	Total		102	40	9	2	4	1	8	4	123	47
Reading	2003–04	First Division	17	5	0	0	0	0	—		17	5
Reading	2004–05	Championship	37	19	0	0	0	0	—		37	19
Reading	2005–06	Championship	34	18	2	0	3	4	—		40	22
Reading	2006–07	Premier League	13	2	4	2	0	0	—		18	4
Reading	2007–08	Premier League	34	10	0	0	2	0	—		36	10
Reading	Total		135	54	6	2	5	4	—		146	60
Stoke City	2008–09	Premier League	16	0	1	0	1	0	—		18	0
Stoke City	2009–10	Premier League	18	3	2	1	2	1	—		22	5
Stoke City	Total		34	3	3	1	3	1	—		40	5
Reading (loan)	2008–09	Championship	10	2	—		—		2 (Note: Appearances in Championship play-offs)	0	12	2
Middlesbrough (loan)	2009–10	Championship	6	3	—		—		—		6	3
Portsmouth	2010–11	Championship	35	8	1	0	1	0	—		37	8
Portsmouth	2011–12	Championship	33	4	1	0	1	0	—		35	4
Portsmouth	Total		68	12	2	0	2	0	—		72	12
Sheffield United	2012–13	League One	33	11	2	1	0	0	2 (Note: Appearances in League One play-offs)	0	37	12
Oxford United	2013–14	League Two	32	4	4	0	0	0	0	0	36	4
Career total			422	129	26	6	14	6	16	4	478	145

== Honours ==
Cambridge United

- Football League Trophy runner-up: 2001–02

Reading

- Football League Championship: 2005–06

Individual

- PFA Team of the Year: 2002–03 Third Division
- Reading Player of the Season: 2004–05

== See also ==
- Nauru national soccer team
