= Charlie Pomroy =

English football manager, AFC A & UEFA A license Coach

Darren Pomroy
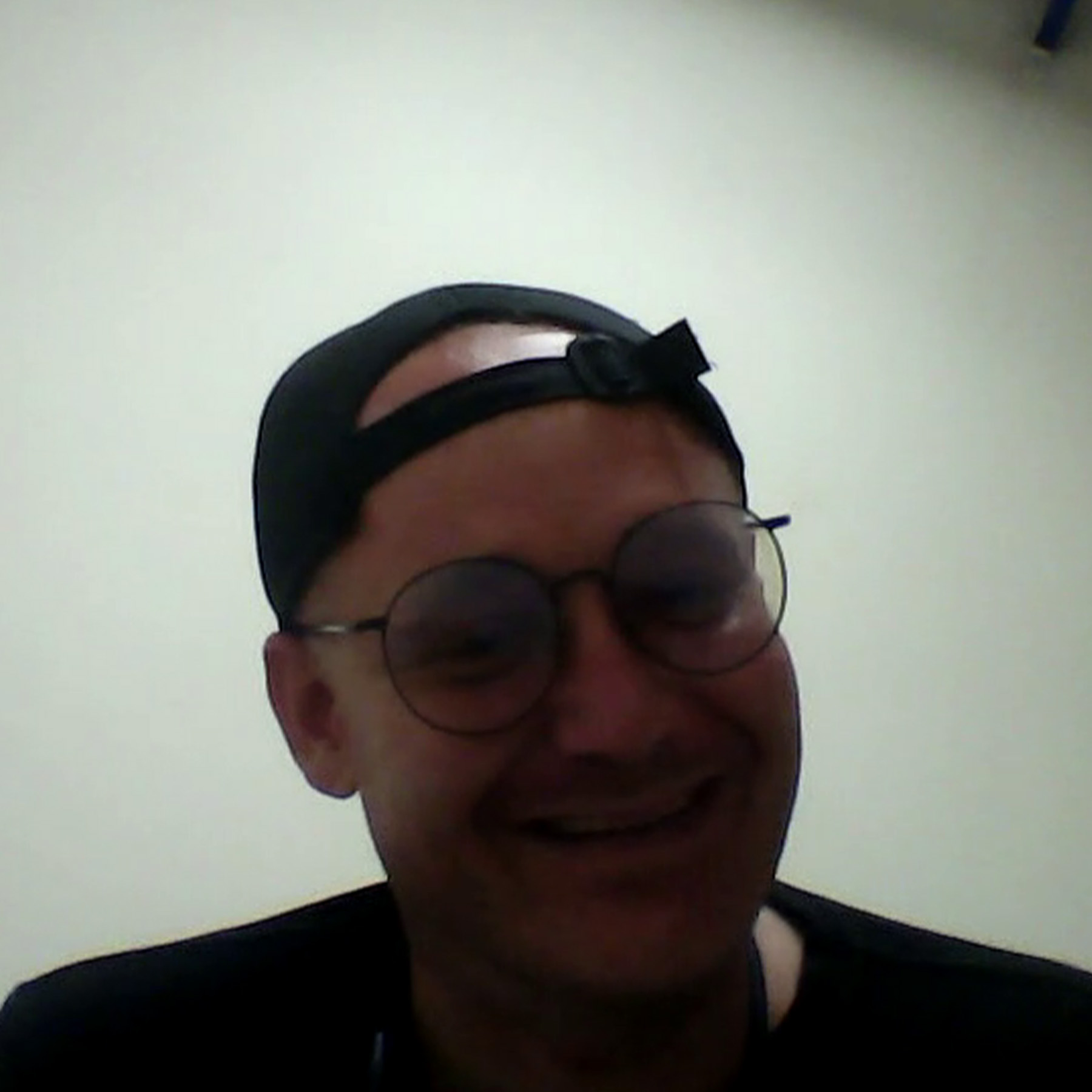
- Pomroy in 2024

Personal information
- Full name: Darren “Charlie” Pomroy
- Date of birth: January 1985 (age 41)
- Place of birth: England

Team information
- Current team: Nauru (head coach)

Managerial career
- Years: Team
- 2010–2011: Biggleswade Town
- 2017–2021: Soltilo Angkor
- 2021–2024: Angkor City
- 2023–: Nauru
- 2025–: Sahayak FC (tecnical director)
- ‡ National team caps and goals as of 12:40, 2 October 2023 (UTC)

Darren "Charlie" Pomroy (born January 1985) is an English professional football manager who is currently the head coach of the Nauru national team.

== Personal life ==
He was born in January of 1985 in England.

== Managerial career ==
He was the head coach of Biggleswade Town for the 2010-11 season in the Southern League Division One Central.

In 2018 he was nominated the new head coach of Soltilo Angkor in Cambodia. He left the role in 2021.

In the same year he was nominated the new manager of Angkor City in the Cambodian League 2. He was relieved from his duties when the team was dissolved in 2023.

In December 2023, Pomroy was announced as the first-ever head coach of the nascent Nauru national team.

In July 2025, he was announced as the Technical Director of Sahayak F.C.Foundation a football club located in the Indian Himalayas, with the objective of building a grassroot environment for youth football in the region.

== Managerial statistics ==
Team	Nat	From	To	Record								Ref.
Team	Nat	From	To	M	W	D	L	GF	GA	GD	Win %	Ref.
Biggleswade Town	(England)	?? August 2010	?? June 2011	0	0	0	0	0	0	+0	—	
Soltilo Angkor	(Cambodia)	1 December 2017	30 June 2021	1	0	0	1	0	1	−1	0.00	
Angkor City	(Cambodia)	1 July 2021	31 March 2024	0	0	0	0	0	0	+0	—	
Nauru	(Nauru)	30 December 2023	Present	0	0	0	0	0	0	+0	—	
Total				1	0	0	1	0	1	−1	0.00	
