= Russ Kun =

President of Nauru from 2022 to 2023

His Excellency Russ Kun MP
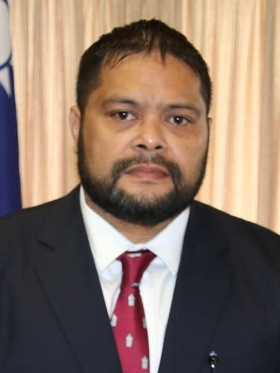
- Kun in 2023

President of Nauru
- In office 29 September 2022 – 30 October 2023
- Deputy: Martin Hunt
- Preceded by: Lionel Aingimea
- Succeeded by: David Adeang

Member of the Nauruan Parliament for Ubenide
- Incumbent
- Assumed office 11 June 2013

Personal details
- Born: Russ Joseph Kun; 8 September 1975 (age 50)
- Spouse: Simina Kun

Russ Joseph Kun (born 8 September 1975) is a Nauruan politician who served as President of Nauru from being elected in the September 2022 presidential election to October 2023. He has served as a member of parliament for Ubenide since 2013.

== Biography ==
Kun was born on 8 September 1975. He served as a scrutineer for the 2003 and 2004 general elections. He served as acting Secretary for the Ministry of Commerce Industry & Resources in 2005. He served as acting Chief Secretary in 2008 and as acting Secretary of Home Affairs in 2012. Prior to entering Parliament, he worked for the Ministry of Commerce, Industry and Environment. Kun also was a member of the Nauru National Commission for UNESCO from 2008 to 2010 and from 2012 to 2013.

Kun was first elected to the Parliament of Nauru in 2013, as one of the four members from Ubenide Constituency. He was re-elected in 2016, 2019, and 2022. In the last Aingimea government, Kun was deputy minister for Finance, Nauru Ports, Tourism, and National Heritage and Museum.

Kun is a member of the Global Organization of Parliamentarians Against Corruption (GOPAC). After attending a GOPAC workshop, he led efforts to develop a code of ethics for the Parliament of Nauru. To this end, he served as chair of the parliamentary Standing Committee on the Leadership Code.

In the first parliament sitting after the 2022 general election, Kun was the sole nominee for President of Nauru. He was sworn in along with his cabinet on 29 September. His own portfolios include foreign affairs and justice and border control.

On 25 October 2023, a vote of no confidence against Kun passed through parliament. David Adeang was elected president via secret ballot by the parliament on 30 October.

== Presidency ==
=== Foreign relations and Taiwan ===
In November 2022, Kun made an official state visit to Taiwan, where he was welcomed with military honors by President Tsai Ing-wen. During the visit, he reaffirmed Nauru’s diplomatic recognition of Taiwan and discussed bilateral cooperation in areas including clean energy, agriculture, public health, port administration, and fisheries.

At the 78th United Nations General Assembly in September 2023, Kun reiterated Nauru’s support for Taiwan, calling for its broader participation in the UN system and commending Taiwan’s contributions to the 2030 Sustainable Development Goals.
