= Anibare district =

Anibare
- District
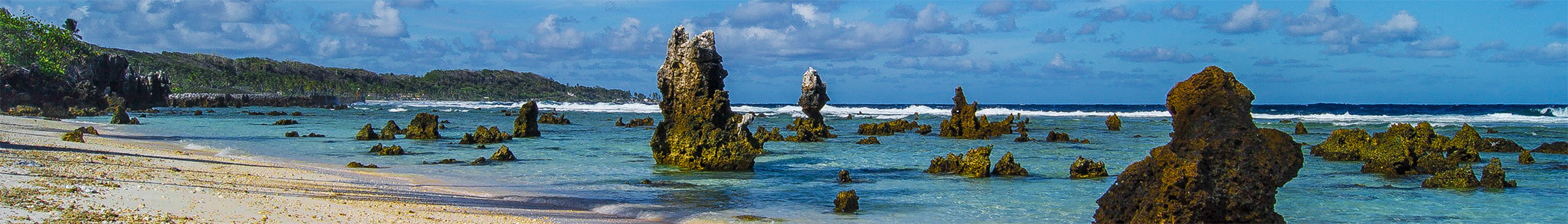
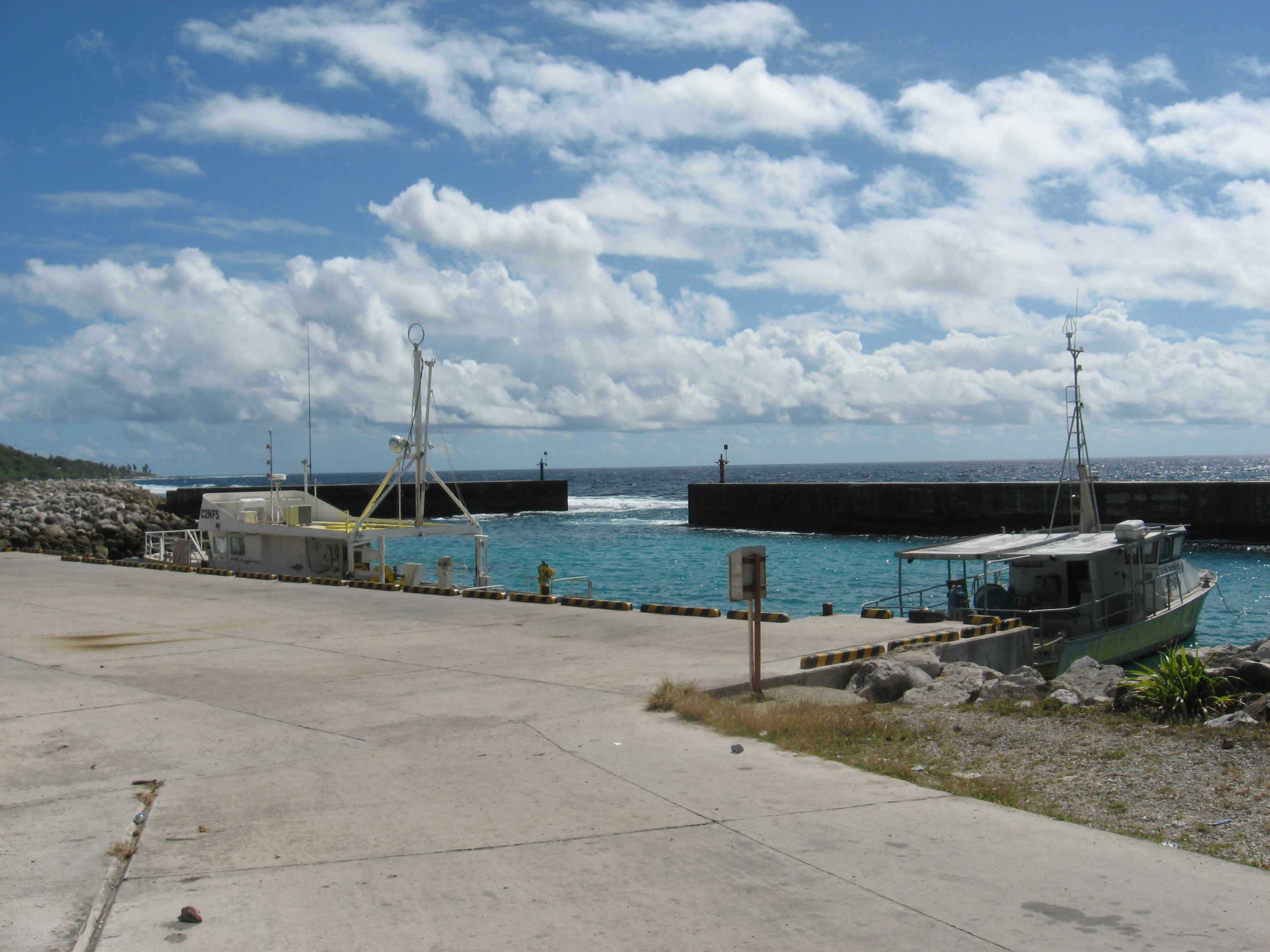
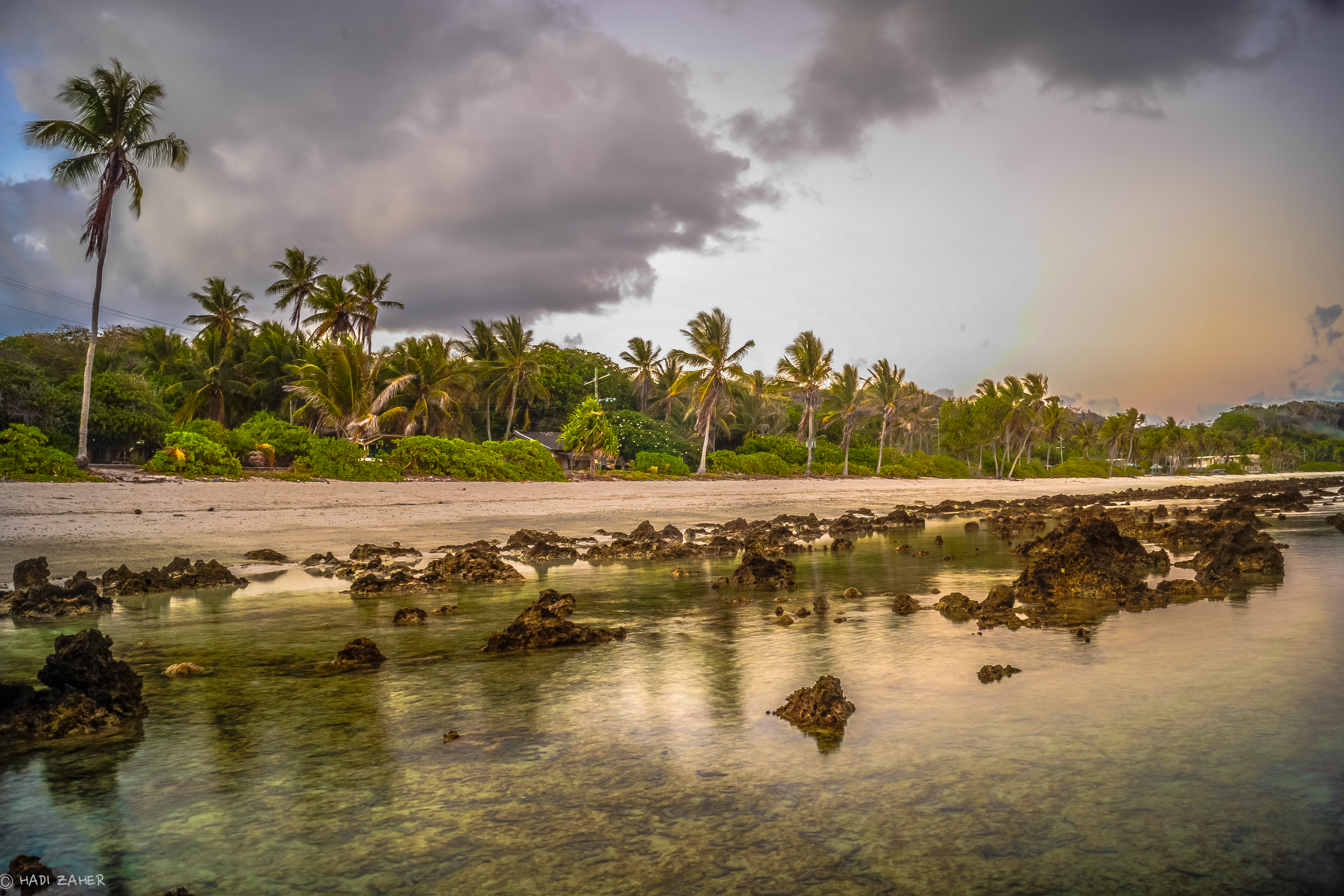
- Anibare Bay Anibare Habour Coastline of Anibare

- Anibare District within Nauru
- Coordinates: 0°31′50″S 166°56′40″E
- Country: Nauru
- Constituency: Anabar

Area
  - Total: 3.1 km^{2} (1.2 sq mi)
- Elevation: 30 m (98 ft)

Population (2021)
  - Total: 373
- Time zone: (UTC+12)
- Area code: +674

Anibare is a district in the island nation of Nauru, a part of the Anabar constituency. It is Nauru's largest district in area, and the smallest in population.

== Geography ==
It is located in the east of the island, and covers an area of 3.1 km^{2} (1 sq mi). It has a population of 373. Nauru's reputation for being densely populated is thus somewhat nuanced, since it refers principally to the average areas and populations of districts other than Anibare.

== Local features ==
- Anibare Bay: A beach with white coral sand near the Menen Hotel which is considered the best place on the island to surf or to swim. It also contains the Anibare Harbor, an artificial commercial fishing area.
- A phosphate stockpile is located in western Anibare.

== See also ==
- Geography of Nauru
- List of settlements in Nauru
- Rail transport in Nauru
