= Aiwo constituency =

Electoral district of Nauru

Aiwo
- Constituency for the Parliament of Nauru
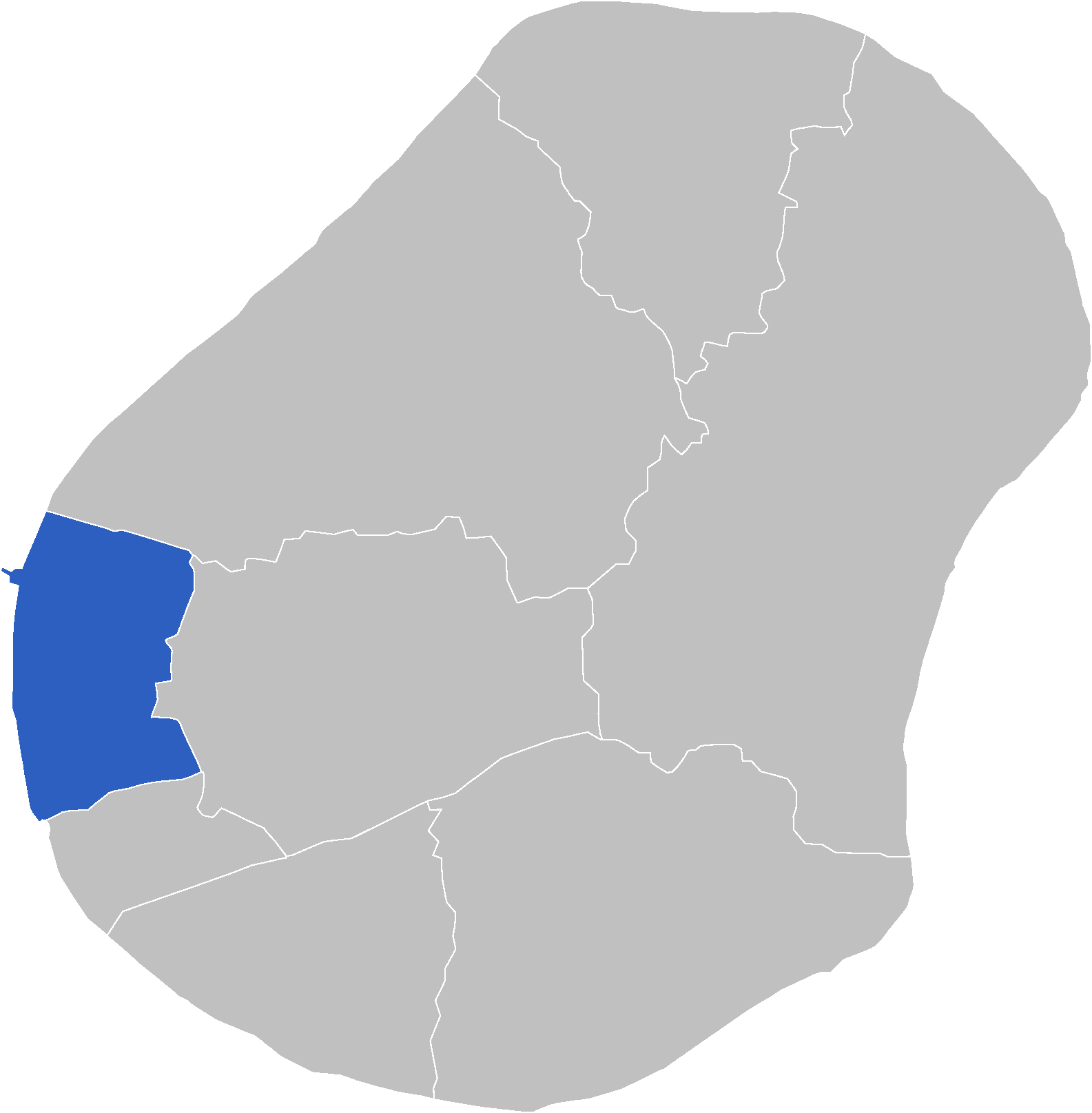
- Location of Aiwo within Nauru
- District: Aiwo
- Population: 1,220 (2011)
- Area: 1.1 km^{2} (0.42 mi^{2})

Current Constituency
- Seats: 2
- Members: Rennier Gadabu; Delvin Thoma

Aiwo (rarely Aiue) is one of the constituencies of Nauru. It returns two members from Aiwo to the Parliament of Nauru in Yaren. It is the westernmost constituency in Nauru.

== Members of Parliament ==
Seat 1
Member	Term	Party
Itubwa Amram	1968-1971	
Kinza Clodumar	1971-1979	Centre Party
David Agir	1979-1983	
Kinza Clodumar	1983-1989	Centre Party
Theodore Moses	1989-1995	
Godfrey Thoma	1995-2007	
Dantes Tsitsi	2007-2010	
Milton Dube	2010–2022	
Delvin Thoma	2022–Present	
Seat 2
Member	Term	Party
Edwin Tsitsi	1968-1976	
René Harris	1977-2008	
Godfrey Thoma	2008-2013	
Aaron Stein Cook	2013–2019	
Rennier Gadabu	2019–present	

== Election results ==
Candidate	Preference votes										Total	Notes
Candidate	1	2	3	4	5	6	7	8	9	10	Total	Notes
Delvin Thoma	326	156	59	38	29	22	24	11	38	171	468.759	Re-elected
Rennier Gadabu	243	298	88	46	28	15	16	24	86	30	458.775	Re-elected
Milton Dube	112	68	73	75	85	41	53	90	124	153	260.816	
Ruskin Edrin Tsitsi	56	76	70	67	67	86	171	134	87	60	218.662	
Rockarny Agir	35	58	100	124	112	122	97	106	79	41	211.052	
Aaron Cook	46	26	109	114	97	105	105	141	84	47	207.392	
Shane Samuel Detenamo	7	101	110	114	134	108	102	84	66	48	204.671	
Vania Emong Scotty	27	27	110	107	143	149	89	80	77	65	195.120	
Elsie Denuga	10	34	106	121	84	100	106	96	92	125	175.915	
Renee-Rose Nancy Harris	12	30	49	68	95	126	111	108	141	134	158.757	
Valid votes	874											
Invalid votes	18											
Total votes	892											
Source: Electoral Commission of Nauru
