= Anabar constituency =

Anabar
- Constituency
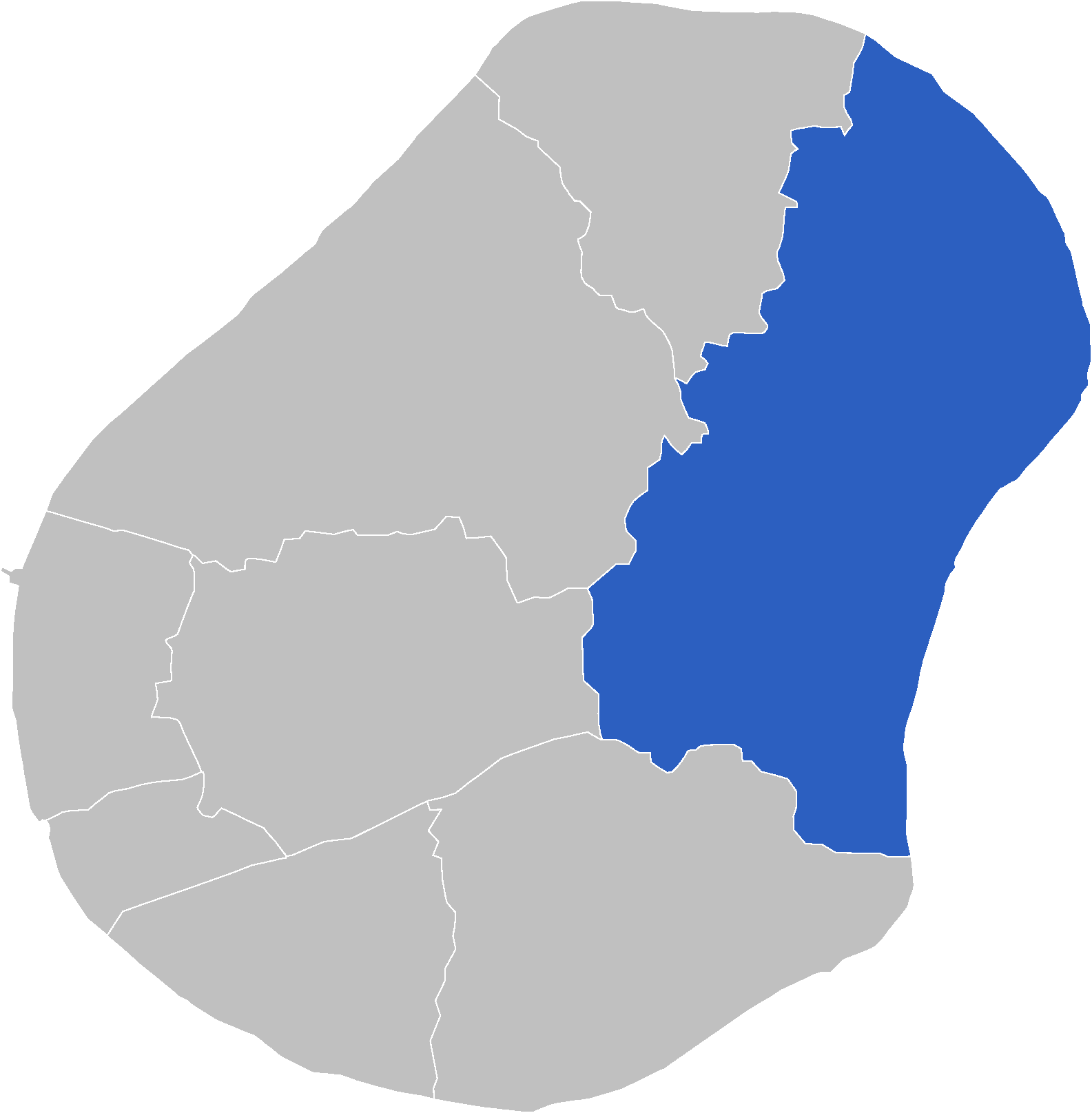
- Anabar Constituency within Nauru
- Coordinates: 0°31′0″S 166°57′0″E
- Country: Nauru
- Districts: 3 (Anabar, Anibare, Ijuw)

Area
  - Total: 5.1 km^{2} (2.0 sq mi)

Population (2011)
  - Total: 1,240
- Time zone: (UTC+12)
- Area code: +674
- Members of Parliament: 2

Anabar is one of the constituencies of Nauru and is made up of three districts: Anabar, Anibare, and Ijuw. It covers an area of 5.1 km^{2}, and has a population of 1,240. It returns two members to the Parliament of Nauru in Yaren. It is the largest and easternmost constituency in Nauru.

== Members of Parliament ==
Seat 1
Member	Term	Party
Ludwig Scotty	1983–2016	Non-partisan
Jaden Dogireiy	2016–2019	
Ludwig Scotty	2019	
Maverick Eoe	2019–Present	
Seat 2
Member	Term	Party
James Deireragea	?-2003	Non-partisan
Riddell Akua	2003–2019	Nauru First
Pyon Deiye	2019–Present	

== Election results ==
Candidate	Preference votes							Total	Notes
Candidate	1	2	3	4	5	6	7	Total	Notes
Maverick Eoe	402	97	43	35	65	52	29	499.393	Re-elected
Pyon Deiye	209	118	51	38	31	15	261	340.486	Re-elected
Tini Duburiya	26	79	195	199	107	77	40	220.198	
David Demaunga	31	141	75	100	117	121	138	214.781	
Jeb Nobob Bop	41	76	88	99	121	233	65	205.402	
Joel Jonathan Joram	11	92	159	120	121	108	112	198.200	
Jaden Dogireiy	3	120	112	132	161	117	78	196.176	
Valid votes	723								
Invalid votes	11								
Total votes	734								
Source: Electoral Commission of Nauru
