= Secondary education in New Zealand =

Secondary education in New Zealand takes up to five years, covering the ages 13 to 18, corresponding to the school years 9 to 13.

== History ==
In 1940, there were 156 schools in New Zealand offering secondary education: 39 secondary schools, 96 district high schools, and 21 technical high schools.

In 1944, the school leaving age was raised from 14 to 15. At the same time, a gradual move started away from separate secondary schools and technical high schools toward comprehensive secondary schools serving both, and district high schools started falling out of favour to separate secondary schools. Combined with the post-World War II baby boom, the number of secondary students swelled and a large number of new secondary schools had to be built. To save construction time and costs, most secondary schools built in the 1950s, 1960s and 1970s were built to standard plans.

By 1960, the number of secondary students had tripled from 39,000 to 140,000, and the number of secondary schools had increased to 239, comprising 102 secondary schools, 96 district high schools, and 41 technical high schools. By 1980, there were 265 secondary schools and 35 district high schools, with technical high schools having been completely phased out.

In 1989, the school leaving age was raised to the present age of 16. Also in 1989, the Tomorrow's Schools reform was implemented, moving the governance of secondary schools from district education boards to individual school communities through elected boards of trustees.

== Types of school ==
There are three types of school: state, private (or registered or independent) and state integrated schools. State and state integrated schools are government funded. Private schools receive about 25% of their funding from the government, and rely on tuition fees for the rest. State integrated schools are former private schools which are now "integrated" into the state system under the Private Schools Conditional Integration Act 1975 "on a basis which will preserve and safeguard the special character of the education provided by them". According to Ministry of Education statistics, of the 284,052 secondary students (Years 9–15) enrolled in New Zealand schools at 1 July 2012, 81.6 percent (231,817) attend state schools, 12.6 percent (35,924) attend state integrated schools, and 5.7 percent (16,230) attend private schools.

Many private schools, state area schools and state integrated schools take students from Years 0 to 13, or Years 7 to 13.

== State school enrolment schemes ==
For state schools, the Education Amendment Act 2000 puts in place a new "system for determining enrolment of students in circumstances where a school has reached its roll capacity and needs to avoid overcrowding." Schools which operate enrolment schemes have a geographically defined "home zone". Residence in this zone, or in the school's boarding house, if it has one, gives right of entry to the School. Students who live outside the school's home zone can be admitted, if there are places available, in the following order of priority: special programmes; siblings of currently enrolled students; siblings of past students; children of board employees; all other students. If there are more applications than available places then selection must be through a ballot, which is randomly selected.

Critics have suggested that the system is fundamentally unfair as it restricts the choice for parents to choose schools and schools to choose their students. In addition, there is evidence that property values surrounding some more desirable schools become inflated, thus restricting the ability of lowers socio-economic groups to purchase a house in the zone.

== School qualifications ==
The Government-run student qualification system is the National Certificate of Educational Achievement ("NCEA"). At some schools students can opt for IGCSE/A-levels (popularly known as "Cambridge exams") or the International Baccalaureate Diploma.

NCEA has three levels, one for each of the last three years of secondary school. It contains a mix of internal and external assessments. NCEA replaced the old School Certificate, Sixth Form Certificate and Bursary systems.

The IGCSE and A-level exams of the Cambridge International Examinations Board are offered at some schools. For these qualifications, IGCSE is sat in year 11, AS-level in year 12 and A-level in year 13. Neither of these independent qualifications are registered on the NZQA National Qualifications Framework.

University Entrance, based on NCEA results, allows entrance to New Zealand universities. New Zealand Scholarship is a qualification pitched at students within the top stanine level.

== Fees and donations ==
Strictly speaking, no fees need to be paid for education at a state school provided the student is a New Zealand citizen or permanent resident, or an Australian citizen. However, most schools also ask for a "voluntary donation" from parents, informally known as "school fees" or a "parental contribution".

== Trades unions ==
The Post Primary Teachers' Association (PPTA) is the largest trade union in secondary education in New Zealand with 18,000 teaching staff employed in state and state integrated secondary schools being members.

Independent Schools Education Association (ISEA) is the union for teaching and non-teaching staff in New Zealand independent (private) schools.

== See also ==
- Education in New Zealand
- For a list of New Zealand schools with Wikipedia articles, see Category:Schools in New Zealand
