= Rangitoto College =

Location
- 564 East Coast Road, Windsor Park, Auckland; 36°44′14″S 174°44′12″E

Information
- Type: State co-ed Secondary (Year 9–13)
- Motto: Latin: Circumspice (Look around)
- Established: 1956
- Ministry of Education Institution no.: 28
- Principal: Greg Thornton
- Enrolment: 4,167 (July 2026)
- Socio-economic decile: 10Z
- Website: www.rangitoto.school.nz

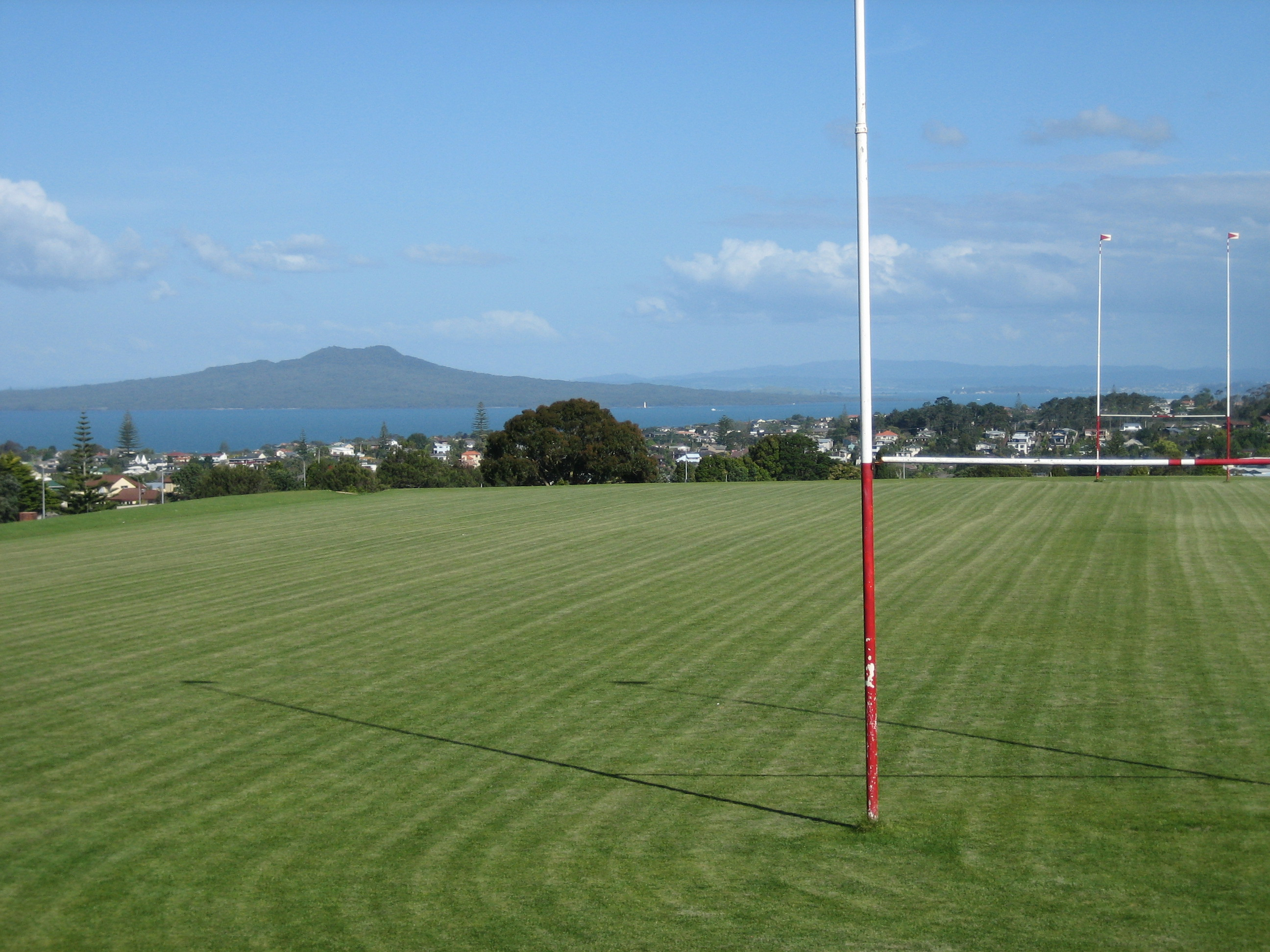
View from the playing fields to Rangitoto Island

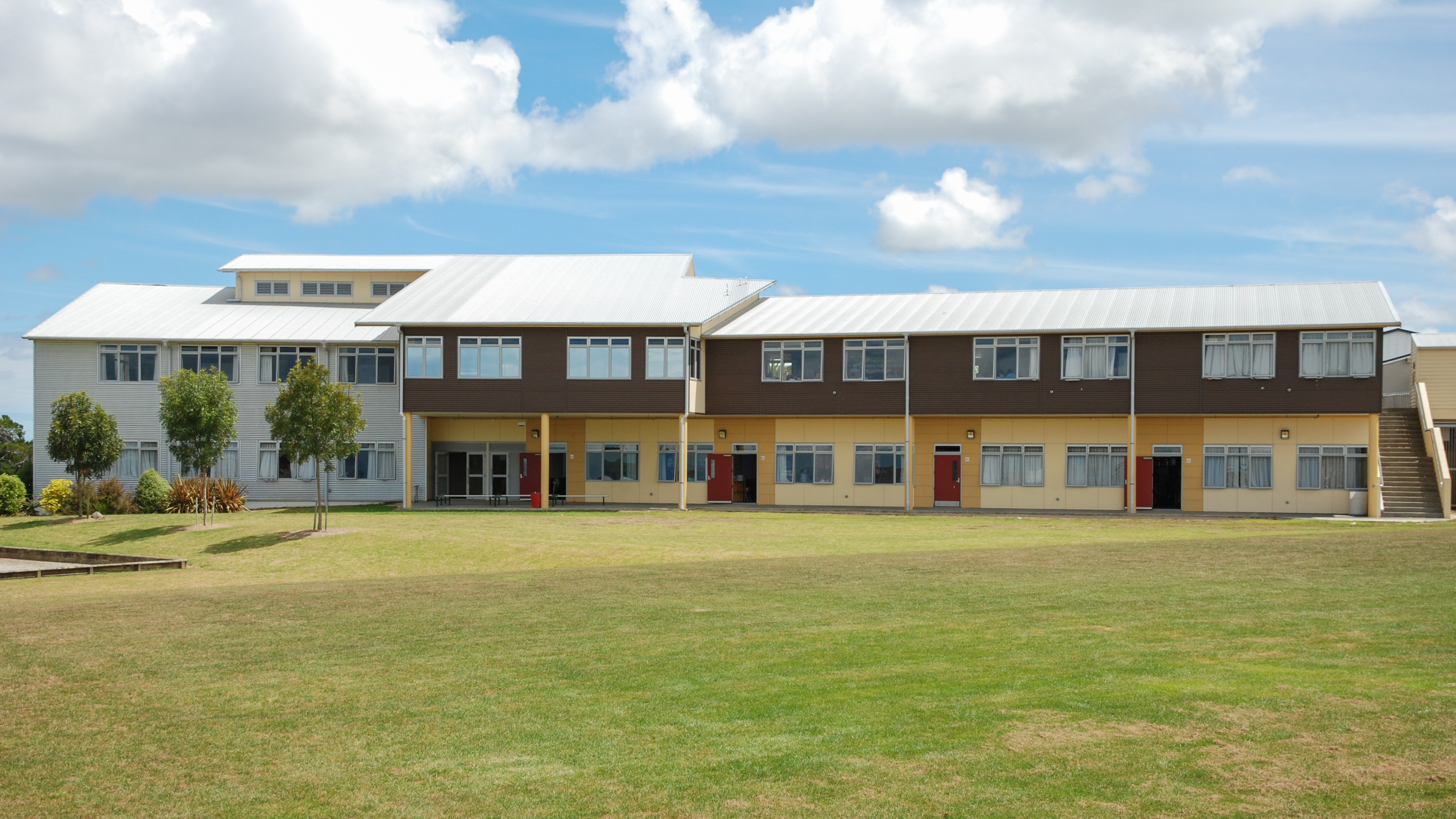
The Mathematics building at Rangitoto College

Rangitoto College is a state coeducational secondary school, located on the North Shore of Auckland, New Zealand. Serving years 9 to 13, Rangitoto has a school roll of 4,167 as of July 2026, making it the largest "brick-and-mortar" school in New Zealand (only The Correspondence School is larger, with 8,718 students). As of 20 April 2026, Greg Thornton is the school's principal.

== History ==
Rangitoto College opened in 1956, with an initial roll of 180 Year 9 and 10 students (then known as Forms 3 and 4). A block and D block are the school's two original buildings; these are standard school buildings of the "1950s Single Storey" type, with long single-storey blocks of classrooms orientated east-west with a corridor connecting the classrooms on the south side.

== Location ==
Rangitoto College is located in Mairangi Bay, on the East Coast Bays on Auckland's North Shore. The easternmost field as well as many of the classrooms on the eastern side of the school have a view of the Rangitoto Channel as well as Rangitoto Island.

== Enrolment ==
Like many secondary schools in Auckland, Rangitoto College operates an enrolment scheme to curb roll numbers and prevent overcrowding. Rangitoto's enrolment zone, in which students residing are automatically entitled to be enrolled without rejection, covers approximately 12 square kilometres (4.6 sq mi), and includes Browns Bay, Campbells Bay, Mairangi Bay, Murrays Bay, Pinehill, Rothesay Bay, Sunset North, and Windsor Park, and parts of Meadowood and Rosedale east of the Auckland Northern Motorway. Students residing outside the zone are accepted as roll places allow per the enrolment scheme order of preference and secret ballot.

As of March 2021, Rangitoto College had 3284 students enrolled. Of the students, 1578 were Pākehā/European, 1165 were Asian, 198 were Māori, 65 were Pasifika, 87 were International Students, 159 were MELAA, and 32 students were from other ethnicities and demographics.

As of 2026, Rangitoto College has an Equity Index of 397, placing it amongst schools whose students have the fewest socioeconomic barriers to achievement (roughly equivalent to decile 9 or 10 under the former socio-economic decile system).

== Recent principals ==
In mid-2005, principal Allan Peachey stood down in order to stand as a National Party candidate for election to Parliament. Alison Cleland took over as principal in the interim. As a result of Peachey's election as the Member of Parliament for the Tamaki electorate, David Hodge, a former student at Rangitoto College, was appointed as Principal in 2006, but left in 2017. Patrick Gale was the principal until he left to become the headmaster of King's College, in late 2025. Peter Morton served as acting principal until Greg Thornton, principal of Cambridge High School, was hired to be the next principal of Rangitoto College. Thornton, a previous student, assumed the role on April 20th, 2026.

== Facilities ==
=== Auditorium ===
The Rangitoto College Auditorium has a seating capacity of 960 people and is equipped with audiovisual and lighting systems. The auditorium also has a stage with backstage facilities for performers, including dressing rooms and storage space.

=== Library ===
The Rangitoto College Library is a facility that has a collection of books, magazines, journals, and online resources, including e-books and databases.As of December 2025, a new library and technology building is being built.

=== Sports Fields ===
The main sports fields at Rangitoto College include a full-size artificial turf hockey field and several grass fields for sports such as soccer, rugby, and cricket. The school is located near the AUT Millennium, which also has a running track, long jump pit, and other facilities for athletics events.

=== Gymnasium ===
The main gymnasium at Rangitoto College is a large facility that is equipped with a range of equipment and facilities for sports such as basketball, volleyball, and badminton. It also has a fitness center and space for other activities.

In addition to the main gymnasium, the school also has two smaller gymnasiums that are used for junior sports and physical education classes.

== Academic performance ==
Rangitoto College is a decile 10 school, meaning that, as the ERO (Education Review Office) puts it, Rangitoto draws its students from an area of 'least socio-economic disadvantage'. The data show that it performs at, or above, the average level for decile 10 schools nationally. Like other decile 10 schools, Rangitoto performs better than schools from areas of greater socio-economic disadvantage.

Prior to Bursary being replaced by the National Certificate of Educational Achievement Rangitoto had at least one student recognised as New Zealand's top scholar in a subject between 2001 and 2003; in 2003 Rangitoto had three four top-scholars including top all-round Female Māori Scholar. In 2006 a Rangitoto College student was named "Top Scholar in New Zealand" for the subject of history in 2006 based on the NCEA framework.

In 2013, 94.4 percent of students leaving Rangitoto College held at least NCEA Level 1, 89.5 percent held at least NCEA Level 2, and 76.3 percent held at least University Entrance. This is compared to 85.2%, 74.2%, and 49.0% respectively for all students nationally.

In 2021, Rangitoto College students collectively achieved 244 scholarship passes in the New Zealand Scholarship exams which included 34 "Outstanding" passes. Sixteen students gained four or more scholarship passes, with a further fourteen students gaining three scholarship passes. Six students gained Outstanding Scholar Awards (~60 nationwide) and one student, with ten scholarship passes, gained a Premier Scholar Award (Top ~12 nationwide). The Premier Award winner was also the Top Subject Scholar for Art History, Geography, and Statistics while one of the Outstanding award winners was the Top Subject Scholar for Health & Physical Education. This placed the school as the top scholarship school in New Zealand for the fourth year in a row.

In 2025, Rangitoto College gained 348 scholarship passes, which was once more the greatest amount in the country.

== Notable alumni ==
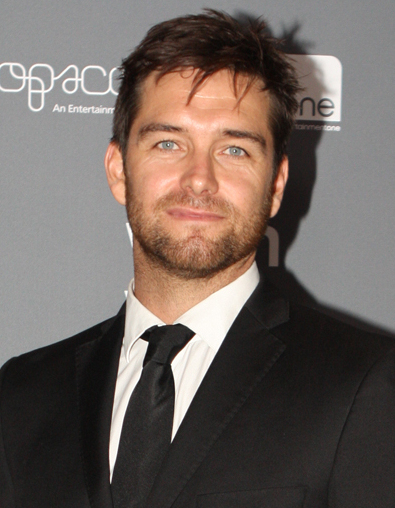
Alumni Antony Starr gained global prominence for his onscreen portrayal of Homelander.

- Amy Adams – member of parliament for the Selwyn electorate
- Marco Alexander – basketball player
- Terenzo Bozzone – athlete
- Claudia Bunge – New Zealand international football player
- Graham Candy – actor/musician
- Oliver Driver – actor/TV personality
- Dan Fotu – basketball player
- Isaac Fotu – basketball player
- Chloe Gong – author
- Mikey Havoc – media personality
- Lizzy Igasan – hockey player
- Anna Leat – New Zealand international football player
- Alex Maloney – Olympic sailor, silver medalist in the 49er FX class at Rio 2016
- Sean Marks – former basketball player in the NBA / Tall Blacks, current GM for the Brooklyn Nets
- Dean O'Gorman – actor, artist, photographer
- Erica Stanford – member of parliament for the East Coast Bays electorate
- Antony Starr – award winning actor
- Corney Swanepoel – Olympic swimmer
- Louise Upston – member of parliament for the Taupō electorate
- Anna Willcox-Silfverberg – skier and TV sports reporter
- Tai Wynyard – professional basketball player; former college player for the University of Kentucky

Bands

- Midnight Youth – band formed at Rangitoto College
- The Naked and Famous – band comprising majority of members from Rangitoto College
