= List of universities in Tonga =

As of 2020, there were only two accredited universities in Tonga: the University of the South Pacific (Tonga campus) and Christ's University in Pacific. In a ruling 14 January 2022, however, the Chief Justice of Tonga's Supreme Court opined that the Tonga National Accreditation Board had been "on notice" since 2018 to assess the application of 'Atenisi Institute and been "repeatedly reminded" by said Court and the Court of Appeal of its duty to do so.

In January 2023 the Tonga Institute of Education, Tonga Institute of Higher Education, Tonga Institute of Science and Technology, Tonga Maritime Polytech Institute, Queen Salote Institute of Nursing and Allied Health and Tonga Police College were merged to form the Tonga National University.

Other tertiary institutions include:

- ʻAtenisi Institute
- Hango Agricultural College
- Tupou Tertiary Institute

A number of unaccredited institutions operate or purport to operate from Tonga, including:

- King's International University, Tonga
- University of the Nations (Tonga campus)
- ABAB University (formerly ISAL institute)
- Commonwealth Vocational University (Makaunga)

== See also ==
- List of universities by country
