= Orquidea Tamayo Mortera =

Mexican New Zealand Diversional and Recreational therapist

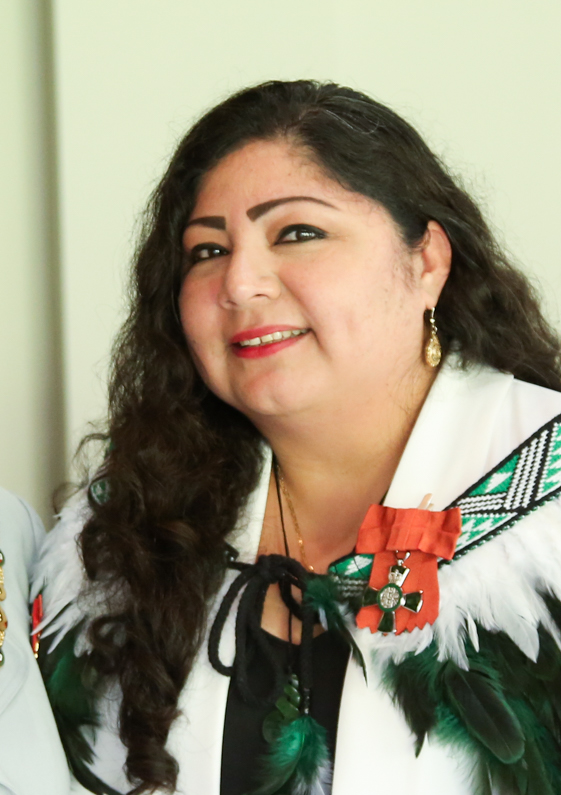
- Tamayo Mortera in 2024
- Awards: Member of the New Zealand Order of Merit (for services to diversional and recreational therapy and education, 2024)

Orquidea Nallely Gabriela Tamayo Mortera MNZM is a Mexican–New Zealand therapeutic recreation specialist. She is the former president and the inaugural Director of Strategic Engagement of the New Zealand Society of Diversional and Recreational Therapists. In 2024 Mortera was appointed a Member of the New Zealand Order of Merit for services to diversional and recreational therapy and education.

== Career ==
Tamayo Mortera is Mexican, and was born in Coatzacoalcos in Veracruz. She moved to New Zealand in the 2000s.

Tamayo Mortera is a New Zealand therapeutic recreation specialist, working across healthcare, aged care, mental health and disability sectors. She has instituted programmes such as Cycling Without Age and Baby Buddies, where parents bring their young babies into rest homes. Tamayo Mortera has promoted the training and education of diversional and recreational therapists, training more than 1000 therapists. Tamayo Mortera assisted in getting both the New Zealand Diploma and the bachelor's degree in diversional and recreational therapy recognised by the New Zealand Qualifications Authority.

From 2018 to 2025 Tamayo Mortera was the national president of the New Zealand Society of Diversional and Recreational Therapists. She is currently the co-chair of Allied Health Aotearoa New Zealand, a forum for representation of allied health professionals.

== Honours and awards ==
In 2022 Tamayo Mortera was awarded a NAAP Director’s Award of Excellence by the United States National Association of Activity Professionals "for her global contributions in bringing together therapeutic recreation organisation leaders during the COVID-19 pandemic to share resources".

In the 2024 King's Birthday Honours Mortera was appointed a Member of the New Zealand Order of Merit for services to diversional and recreational therapy and education.
