= Digital Natives Academy =

New Zealand non-profit educational organization

Digital Natives Academy (DNA) is a non-profit educational organisation based in Rotorua, New Zealand. Established in 2014, DNA was the first New Zealand charitable trust to focus on strengthening digital and creative tech pathways amongst young people, particularly Māori youth, by offering access to high spec technology and free training in the areas of digital and creative tech, including coding, robotics, digital wellbeing, animation, illustration, esports and game development. The organisation operates a 1100 sqm community-focused tech hub in Rotorua and collaborates with educational institutions and industry partners to equip young people with skills for the future.

== History ==
Digital Natives Academy was founded in 2014 by Potaua Biasiny-Tule and Nikolasa Biasiny-Tule, who launched Google Māori and TangataWhenua.com, wanted to create a space where young people could explore technology in an inclusive and culturally responsive environment. The academy initially focused on coding and gaming workshops but later expanded to include 2D/3D animation, robotics, digital wellbeing, esports and challenges related to climate change.

In 2015, DNA partnered with the Ministry of Business and Innovation to support their Unlocking Curious Minds initiative and developed a series of robotics and coding workshops aimed at helping to mentor Māori youth to encourage them to explore digital and creative tech as a career. In 2019, Digital Natives Academy partnered with Riot Games to co-design and deliver NZ's first digital wellbeing programme. Over the years, DNA has grown into a leading digital education provider, offering structured learning programs and industry partnerships. In 2023, Digital Natives Academy established its education arm, Native Institute of Digital Technology, Native Tech the first indigenous owned Private Training Establishment to deliver New Zealand Qualifications Authority accredited programmes in digital and creative tech.

In 2025, Digital Natives Academy was recognised at the Matihiko Awards in Christchurch, receiving the Kaupapa Tōtara Award for long-term kaupapa-driven leadership in the Māori tech sector. This honour highlighted DNA’s sustained commitment to creating culturally anchored pathways in digital and creative technologies for rangatahi. It also built on the academy’s earlier recognition, with co-founder Potaua Biasiny-Tule having received the same award in 2023. In the same year, the Internet Corporation for Assigned Names and Numbers (ICANN) announced that Digital Natives Academy was one of 25 organisations worldwide, and the sole recipient from Aotearoa and the Pacific to receive funding through the inaugural ICANN Grant Program to develop an accredited Internet Governance programme.

== Research and collaboration ==
Digital Natives Academy has actively engaged in international research initiatives focused on Data Justice and Artificial Intelligence (AI). DNA collaborated with the Alan Turing Institute, the United Kingdom's national institute for data science and AI, to explore the ethical implications of AI from an indigenous perspective, working with a number of Māori experts in AI. This research aimed to incorporate Māori values and indigenous frameworks into global conversations about responsible AI development and data sovereignty.
