= University of the South Pacific =

Oceanian university headquartered in Suva, Fiji

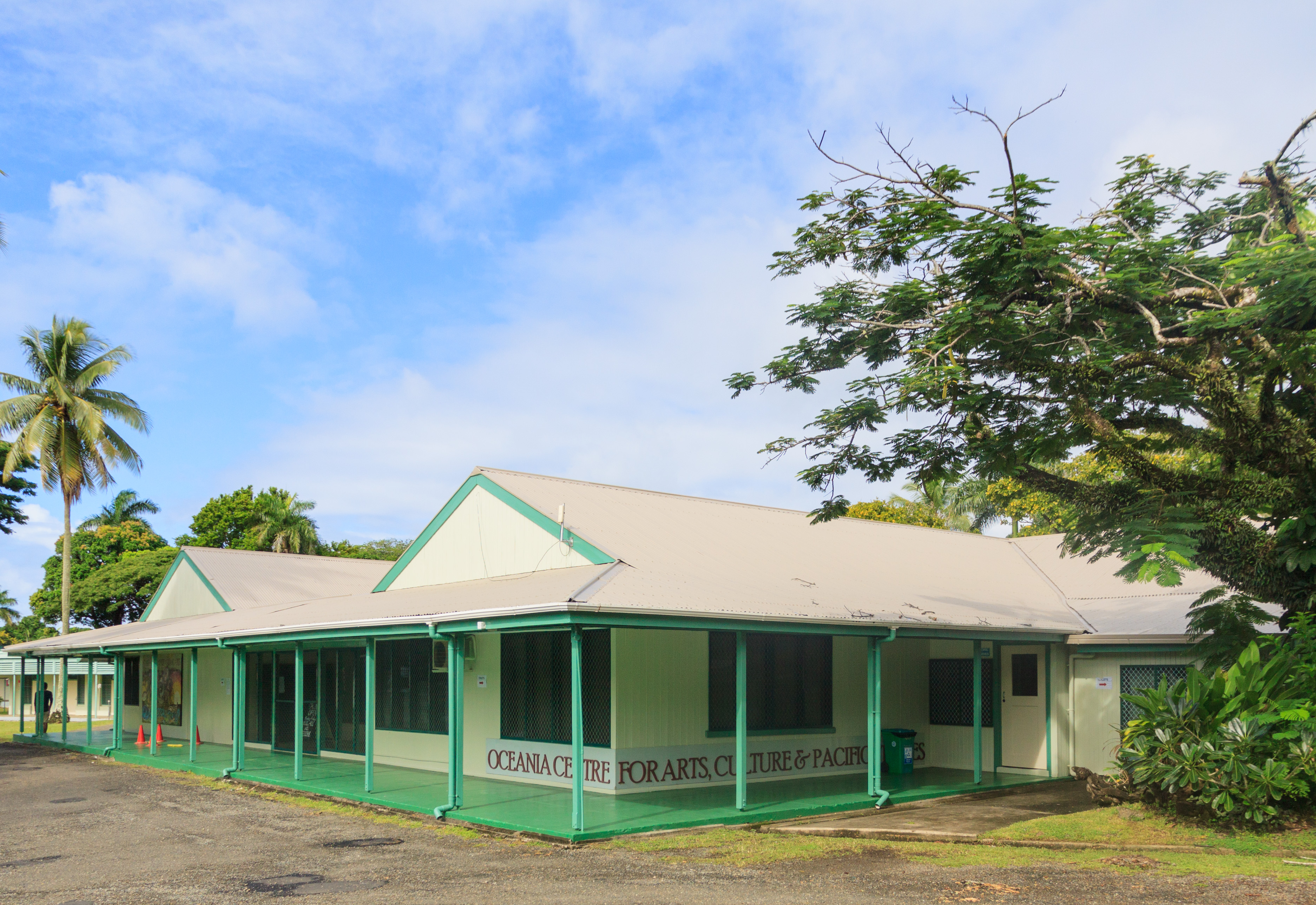
- Oceania Centre for Arts, Culture & Pacific Studies in Suva
- Type: Public
- Established: 1968; 58 years ago
- Chancellor: King Tupou VI
- Vice-Chancellor: Vacant
- Academic staff: 400
- Administrative staff: 1,114
- Students: 29,918 (2017)
- Undergraduates: 16,721(2017)
- Postgraduates: 2,933 (2017)
- Location: Suva, Fiji (main campus)
- Website: www.usp.ac.fj

The University of the South Pacific (USP) is a public research university with locations spread throughout a dozen countries in Oceania. Established in 1968, the university is organised as an intergovernmental organisation and is owned by the governments of 12 Pacific island countries: the Cook Islands, Fiji, Kiribati, Marshall Islands, Nauru, Niue, Samoa, Solomon Islands, Tokelau, Tonga, Tuvalu and Vanuatu.

USP is an international centre for teaching and research on Pacific culture and environment, with almost 30,000 students in 2017. The university's main campus is in Suva, Fiji, with subsidiary campuses in each member state.

== History ==
Discussion of a regional university for the South Pacific began in the early 1950s, when an investigation by the South Pacific Commission recommended the creation of a "central institution" for vocational training in the South Pacific, with a university as a distant goal. In December 1962, the Fijian Legislative Assembly discussed establishing a university in Fiji. In 1964, New Zealand proposed the establishment of a regional teachers' training college in Suva.

In 1965, the governments of Great Britain and New Zealand appointed a "Higher Education Mission to the South Pacific", chaired by Sir Charles Morris, to investigate "the future education requirements of the South Pacific area" and recommend the type of level of institutions needed. In 1966, the Mission reported back, recommending the establishment of "fully autonomous university comprehending within itself, as well as Faculties of Arts and Science, the Fiji School of Medicine, the School of Agriculture in Fiji, a College for the education and training of secondary teachers, the Pacific Theological College, and, in so far its activities in the field of diploma courses are concerned, the Derrick Technical Institute". The Mission recommended that it be called the University of the South Pacific. The former Royal New Zealand Air Force seaplane base at Laucala Bay in Fiji was recommended as a suitable location. A subsequent report by Norman Alexander fleshed out the proposal, and in 1967, the Fijian government passed an ordinance establishing the university's interim council. In February 1970, this was replaced with a royal charter.

The university opened on 5 February 1968, with Colin Aikman as its first vice-chancellor. Initially, teaching was limited to preliminary courses, the equivalent of New Zealand's School Certificate and University Entrance. Degree teaching began in 1969, with a school of natural resources, a school of education, and a school of social and economic development offering interdisciplinary courses. The first graduation ceremony took place on 2 December 1971, with 49 students receiving degrees, diplomas and certificates.

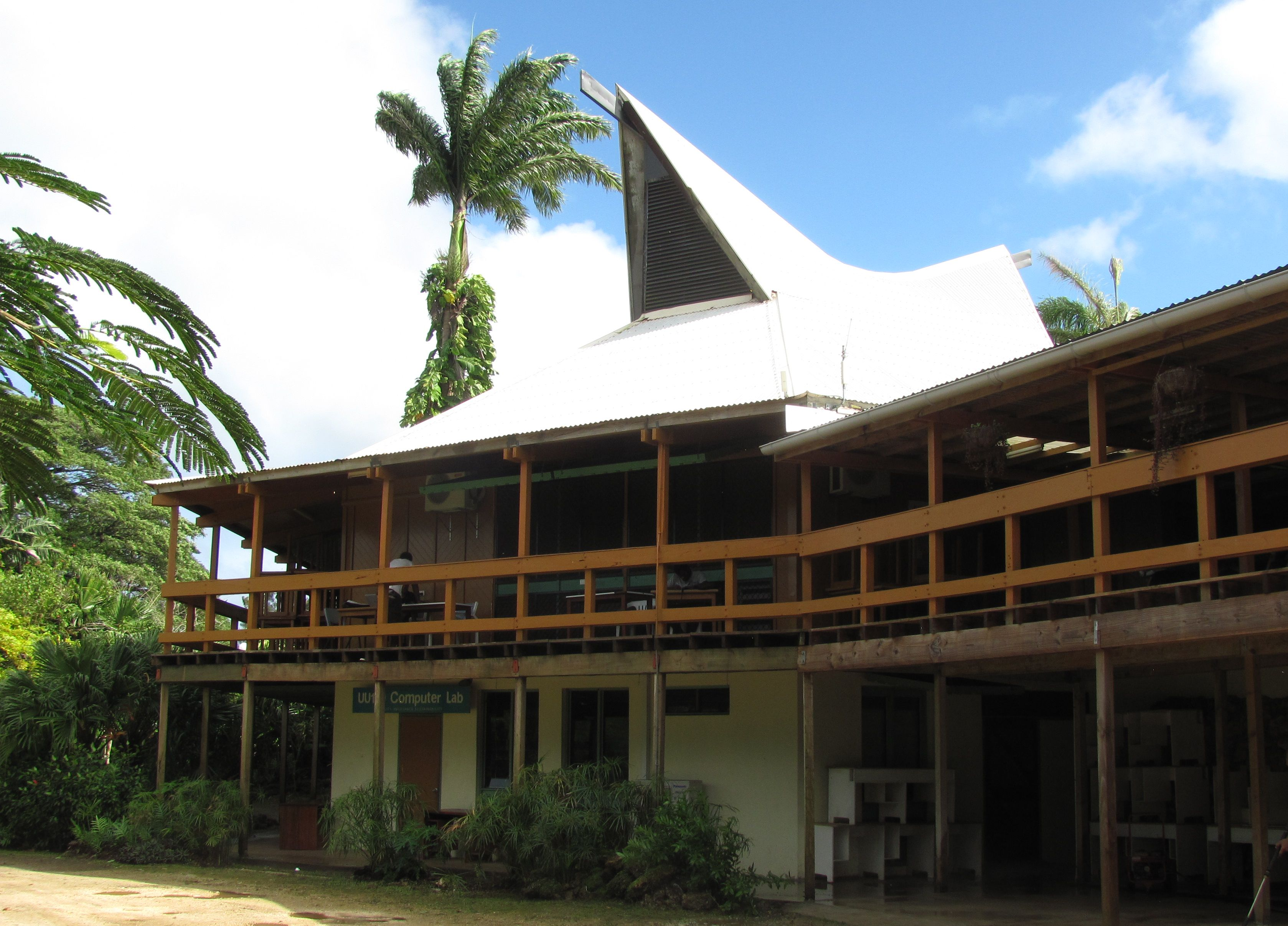
Campus in Port Vila, Vanuatu

In the 1970s, the university began establishing regional extension centres to deliver continuing education, correspondence and extramural courses. It also began to advocate for Pacific regionalism and adopt a distinct "Pacific flavour", with Vice-Chancellor James Maraj arguing that the university should become "truly a university of the peoples of the Pacific". Its students and academics played a major role in the creative writing scene in the Pacific, with literary journals such as Mana, Faikava and Sinnet arising from its campuses.

In 1976, it established the Institute of Pacific Studies under Professor Ron Crocombe to deepen students' awareness of Pacific identity and the region. Over the next 20 years, the institute published works by over 2,000 Pacific authors. A foundation course in Pacific studies is still included in every USP undergraduate programme.

In 1977, the government of Western Samoa leased the South Pacific Regional College of Tropical Agriculture in Alafua to the university to establish a school of agriculture. It is now the university's Alafua campus. In 1989, it opened the Emalus campus in Vanuatu, which, since 1996, has hosted the university's law school and the Pacific Islands Legal Information Institute. In 1991, the Republic of the Marshall Islands became the university's 12th member country. An extension campus was opened there in 1993. In 2012, the university opened a Confucius Institute at the Laucula campus in partnership with the Beijing University of Posts and Telecommunications. In 2017, the university supplemented its governance arrangements with the University of the South Pacific Convention, providing for the recognition of the university by its member-states. The convention came into force on 16 June 2018.

== Governance ==
The university is governed by a council, chaired by the pro-chancellor. The council consists of the ministers of education of member states, additional representatives from Fiji, Samoa, Australia and New Zealand, staff and student representatives, and additional members co-opted by the council. The titular head of the council is the chancellor, a position which rotates among the heads of state and heads of government of the university's members. The King of Tonga, Tupou VI, has served as chancellor since 1 July 2025. An independent University Grants Committee meets every three years to advise member and donor countries on funding levels.

=== Current Leadership ===
The University of the South Pacific is governed by a Chancellor and the University Council, with day-to-day academic and administrative operations led by the Vice-Chancellor and senior executive team. As of 2026, the Vice-Chancellor position is vacant, and key responsibilities are being carried out by senior executives, including the Deputy Vice-Chancellor (Education), acting Deputy Vice-Chancellors responsible for Research and Innovation and Regional Campuses and Global Engagement, and the Chief Operating Officer. Current Leadership of USP

- Chancellor: King Tupou VI
- Pro-Chancellor and Chair of Council: Siosiua Utoikamanu
- Vice-Chancellor and President: Vacant
- Deputy Vice-Chancellor and Vice-President (Education): Jito Vanualailai
- Acting Deputy Vice-Chancellor and Vice-President (Research and Innovation): Gurmeet Singh
- Deputy Vice-Chancellor and Vice-President (Regional Campuses and Global Engagement): Vacant
- Chief Operating Officer: Walter Fraser
- Visitor of the University: Daniel Fatiaki

=== Chancellor ===
The Chancellor is the ceremonial head of the University of the South Pacific (USP). The office rotates among the heads of state or government of USP's member countries and symbolizes the university's regional character. The Chancellor presides over major ceremonies, confers degrees, and serves as a representative of the university throughout the Pacific region. The term is roughly about a year long before a new one is elected.

==== Chancellors of the University of the South Pacific ====
- Head of State of Samoa (2010–2011)
- Governor-General of the Solomon Islands (2011–2012)
- Ulu o Tokelau (2012–2013)
- King of Tonga (2013–2014)
- Governor-General of Tuvalu (2014–2015)
- President of Vanuatu (2015–2016)
- Prime Minister of the Cook Islands (2016–2017)
- Jioji Konrote (2017–2018)
- Taneti Maamau (2018–2019)
- Hilda C. Heine (2019–2020)
- David Kabua (2020)
- Lionel Aingimea (2020–2021)
- Dalton Emani Makamau Tagelagi (2021–2022)
- Tuimalealiifano Vaaletoa Sualauvi II (2022–2023)
- Sir David Vunagi (2023–2024)
- Alapati Tavite (2024–2025)
- King Tupou VI (2025–2026)
- Sir Tofiga Vaevalu Falani (2026–present)

=== Pro-Chancellor ===
The Pro-Chancellor is the senior officer who chairs the University Council, the governing body of the University of the South Pacific (USP). Working closely with the Vice-Chancellor and Council members, the Pro-Chancellor provides governance leadership, oversees strategic direction, and represents the interests of USP's member countries.

==== Pro-Chancellors of the University of the South Pacific ====
- Laʻulu Fetauimalemau Mataʻafa (1971–1976)
- Langi Kavaliku (1976–1981)
- Mosese Qionibaravi (1981–1985)
- Henry Naisali (1985–1990)
- Ieremia Tabai (1991–1997)
- Savenaca Siwatibau (1997–1999)
- Langi Kavaliku (2000–2006)
- Fiame Naomi Mata'afa (2006–2012)
- Ikbal Jannif (2012–2015)
- Fekitamoeloa 'Utoikamanu (Acting; 2015)
- Winston Thompson (2016–2021)
- Hilda C. Heine (2022–2023)
- Pat Walsh (Acting; 2023–2024)
- Siosiua ʻUtoikamanu (2024–present)

=== Vice Chancellor ===
The following people have held the role of vice-chancellor:

- Colin Aikman (1968–1974)
- James Maraj (1975–1982)
- Frank Brosnahan (1982–1983)
- Geoffrey Caston (1983–1992)
- Esekia Solofa (1992–2001)
- Savenaca Siwatibau (2001–2003)
- Anthony Tarr (2005–2007)
- Rajesh Chandra (2007–2018)
- Pal Ahluwalia (2018–2025)
- Vacant (2025–2026)
- TBD (2026-?)

=== Current Deputy Vice-Chancellors ===
- Deputy Vice-Chancellor & Vice-President (Education): Jito Vanualailai
- Deputy Vice-Chancellor & Vice-President (Research and Innovation): Gurmeet Singh
- Deputy Vice-Chancellor & Vice-President (Regional Campuses and Global Engagement): Vacant

=== University Council ===
The University of the South Pacific (USP) Council is the university's highest governing body. It oversees the institution's strategic direction, finances, administration, and overall governance. The Council includes representatives from USP's member countries, staff, students, and regional partners, and is responsible for ensuring that the university fulfils its mission of serving the Pacific region.

==== Chair of the Council ====
- Pro-Chancellor and Chair of Council: Siosiua Utoikamanu

==== Members ====
- Cook Islands – Vaine Mokoroa (Minister for Education)
- Fiji – Aseri Radrodro (Minister for Education) + additional senior government nominees (Navin Raj Shayam; Permanent Secretary for Education, Shiri Gounder; Permanent Secretary for Finance)
- Samoa – Aiono Ekeroma (Minister for Education) + additional senior government nominees (Saoleitiiti Betham-Vaai; Minister of Finance)
- Tonga – Mo'ale 'Otunuku (Minister for Education)
- Tuvalu – Hamoa Holona (Minister for Education)
- Vanuatu – Simil Youse (Minister for Education)
- Solomon Islands – Tozen Leokana (Minister for Education)
- Kiribati – Ruateki Tekaiara (Minister for Education)
- Nauru – Asterio Appi (Minister for Education)
- Niue – Sonya Talagi (Minister for Education)
- Tokelau – Kelihiano Kalolo (Minister for Education)
- Marshall Islands – Gerald Zackios (Minister for Education)

=== Dispute with Fijian government ===
In 2019, Ahluwalia raised concerns about mismanagement and abuse of office at USP under the leadership of Vice-Chancellor Rajesh Chandra. An investigation by New Zealand accounting firm BDO substantiated the allegations, and the report was subsequently leaked online. In June 2020, a special council meeting led by Pro-Chancellor Winston Thompson suspended Ahluwalia for unspecified "misconduct". Staff protesting the suspension were questioned by Fijian police. On 19 June Ahluwalia was reinstated by a full meeting of the USP council, and the allegations against him were dismissed in September 2020.

The Fijian government refused to accept Ahluwalia's exoneration and on 24 September 2020 halted all funding to the university. On 4 February 2021, the Fijian government summarily deported Ahluwalia for being "a person who is or has been conducting himself in a manner prejudicial to the peace, defence, public safety, public order, public morality, public health, security or good government of the Fiji Islands". In response to Fiji government interference in the regional university, Samoa has proposed moving USP's headquarters to Samoa. Following Ahluwalia's deportation, Masasso Pāunga was appointed acting vice-chancellor by the USP Council. The Council also established a subcommittee to investigate the deportation.

Following Ahluwalia's deportation, Samoan Prime Minister Tuilaʻepa Saʻilele Malielegaoi announced that Samoa would be willing to provide a new home for the university. On 25 May, the university's council issued a new three-year contract to Ahluwalia and relocated the vice-chancellor's office to the Alafua Campus in Apia, Samoa. In August 2021, the Fijian government announced that it would not fund the university as long as Ahluwalia was vice-chancellor.

Following the 2022 Fijian general election, the new government led by Sitiveni Rabuka revoked the prohibition order on Ahluwalia and reinstated funding to USP. In March 2023, former Prime Minister Frank Bainimarama and former police commissioner Sitiveni Qiliho were charged with abuse of office for allegedly terminating the police investigation into the 2019 claims of financial mismanagement.

=== Protest and Strike Action 2024 ===
In second half of 2024, the relationship between the USP Staff Association and the Vice Chancellor got bitter after Dr Osborne-Naikatini was sacked for expressing an opinion about the lack of due processes being followed for the renewal of the contract of the Vice Chancellor. This issue led to USPSA calling for removal of Vice Chancellor Pal Ahluwalia from the university and call for strike action with 95 percent majority vote to go to strike.

=== Rankings ===
The Times Higher Education World University Rankings ranked USP in 1001-1200th for 2024.

In 2021, the university was ranked in 1001-1200th by the Times Higher Education World University Rankings. The university claimed that this translated to being ranked in the top 10% of universities in the world, leading to criticism that they were exaggerating their ranking.

== Campuses ==
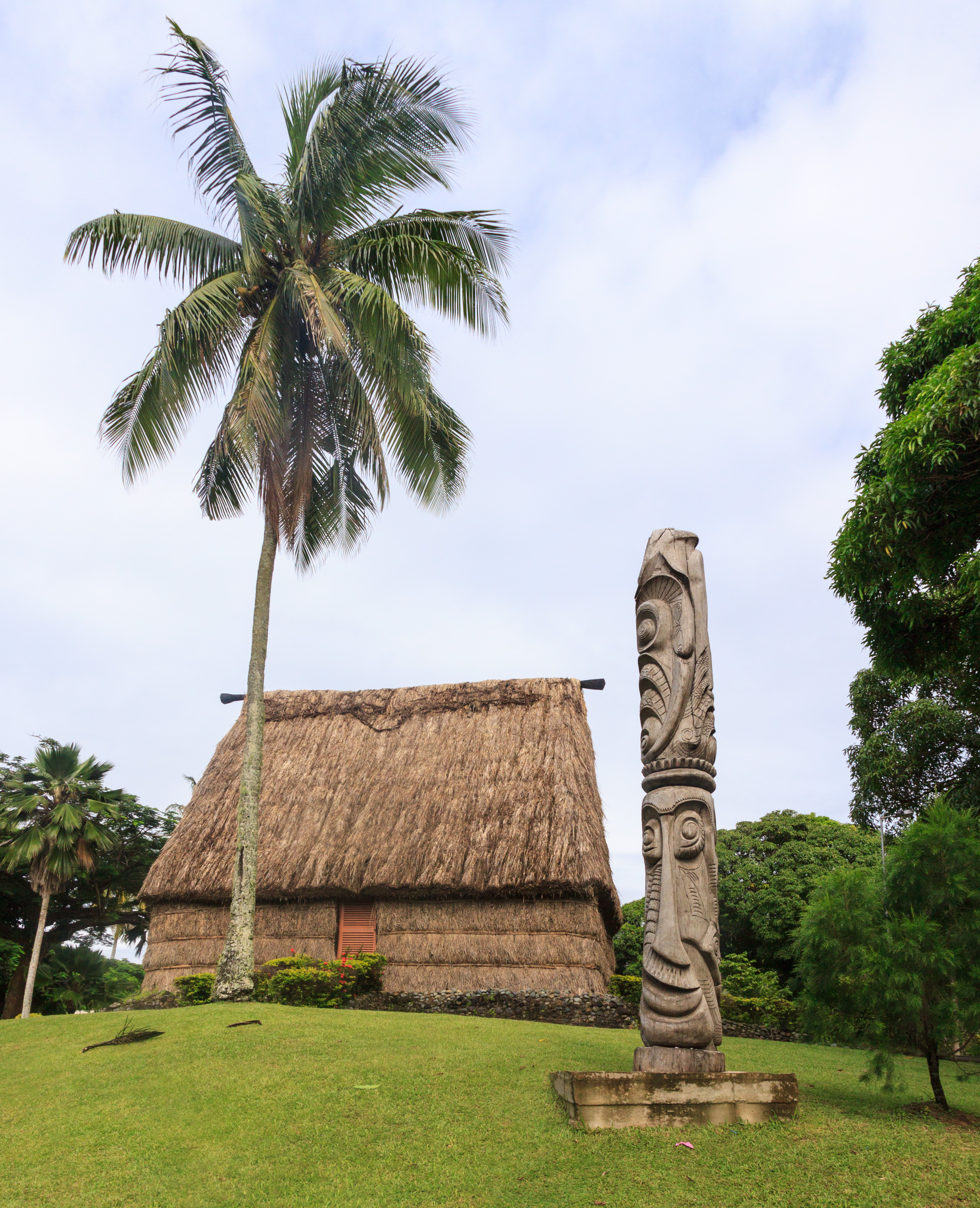
The Pacific Studies Bure at Laucala

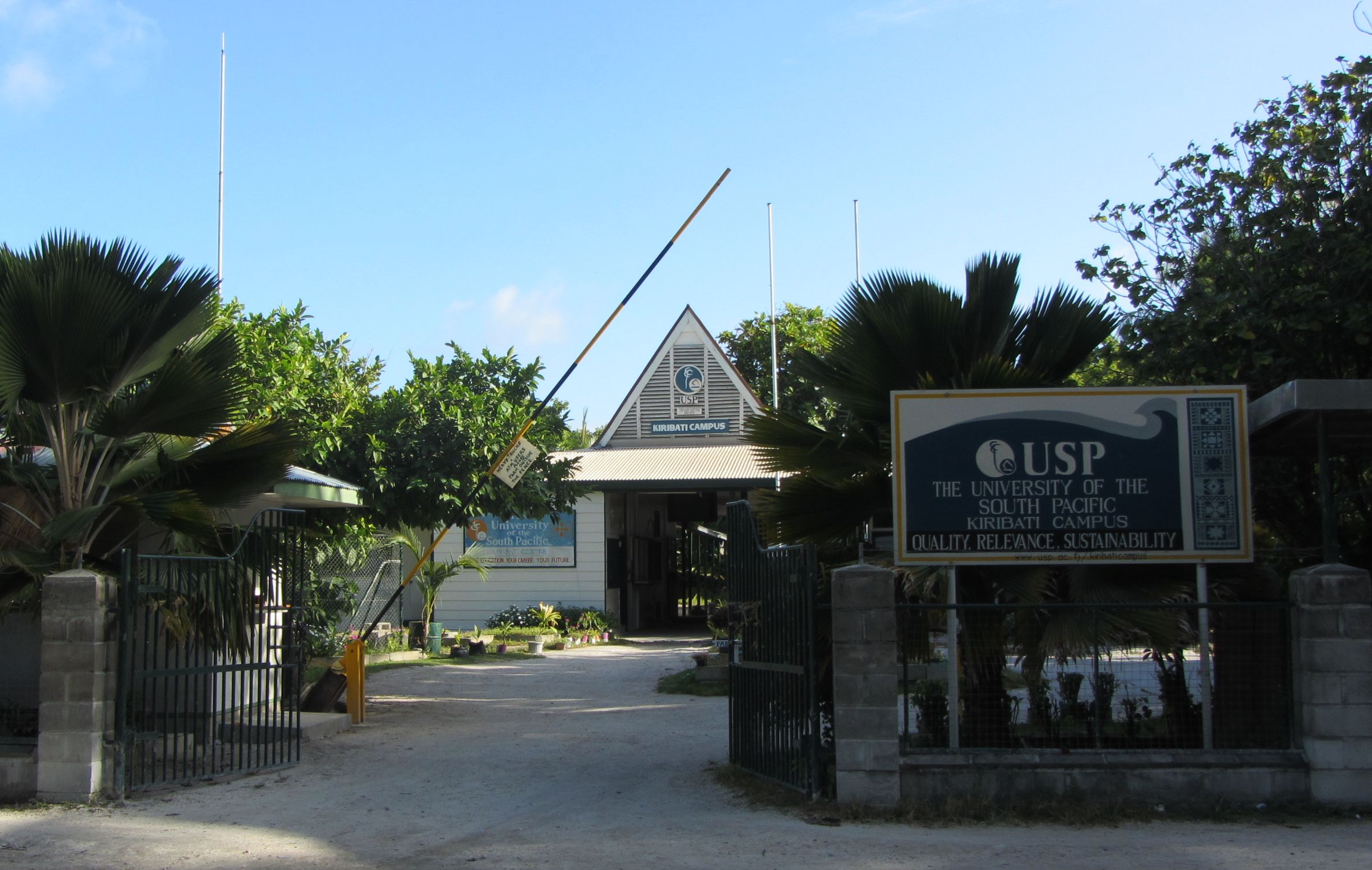
Campus in Teaoraereke, Kiribati

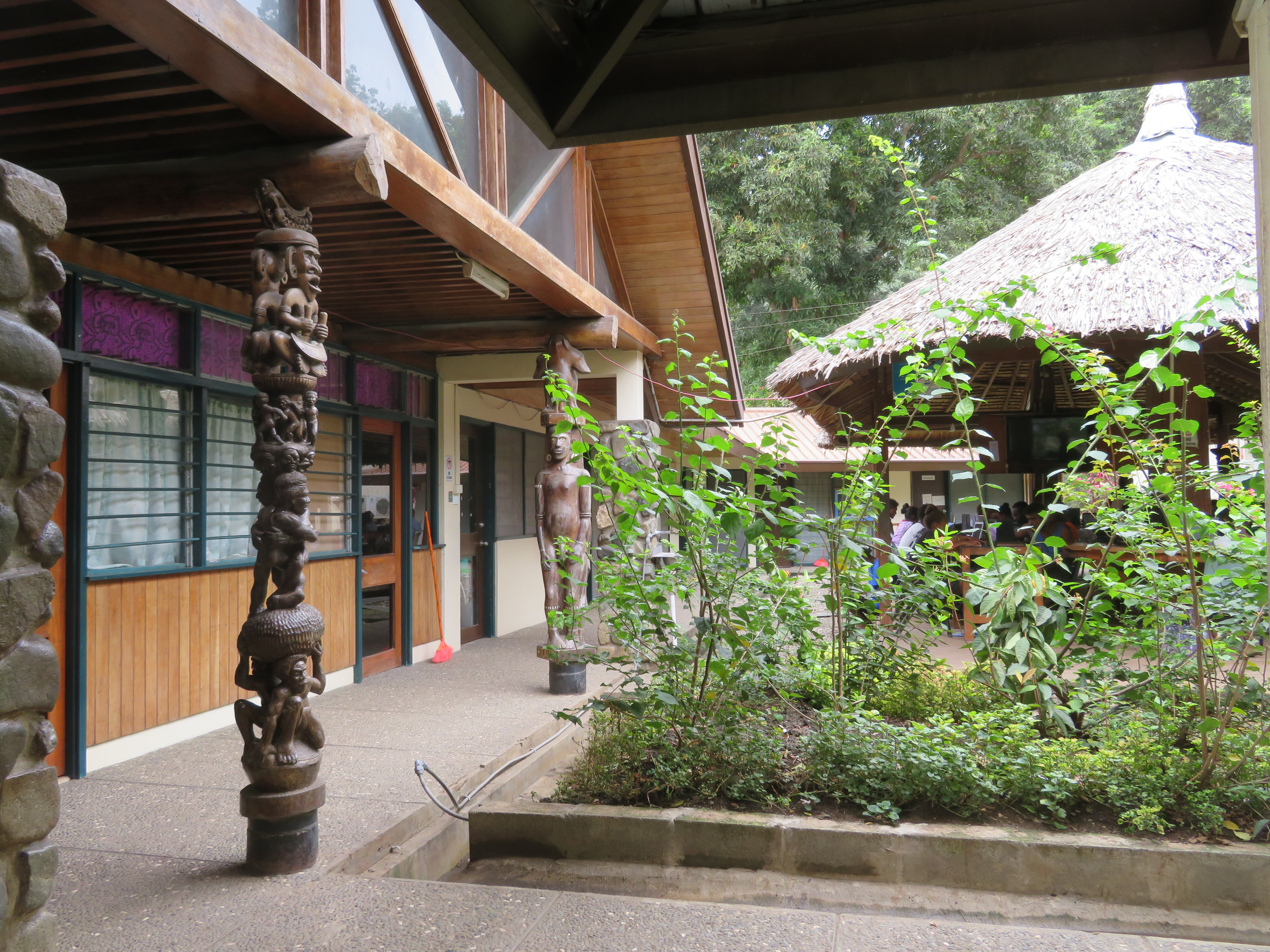
Campus in Honiara, Solomon Islands

Despite its multi-campus nature, the USP is not a university system. It is a single university with several branches across the Pacific Region. USP's Laucala campus, on Laucala Bay in Suva, Fiji, is the main campus of the University, also serving as its administrative centre. USP also has two satellite campuses in Fiji: Labasa and Lautoka. The Alafua campus in Samoa hosts the School of Agriculture and Food Technology. The Emalus campus in Vanuatu is the location for the School of Law. The Nuku-alofa campus in Tonga is where the Institute for Education, directed by Seu'ula Johansson-Fua is based.

USP operates 11 regional centres based in Pacific islands countries. The region served by USP covers 33 million km^{2} of the Pacific Ocean, an area more than three times the size of Europe. In contrast, the total land mass of territories served corresponds to the area of Denmark. Populations of member countries vary from Tokelau with 1,500 people to Fiji with more than 900,000 people. (The population of the region is about 1.3 million.)

The following are the extension campuses of the university, aside from its campuses in Fiji, Samoa, and Vanuatu.

Centres	Town	Country	Established
USP Cook Islands	Rarotonga	Cook Islands	1975
USP Emalus	Port Vila	Vanuatu	
USP Kiribati	Teaoraereke	Kiribati	1978
USP Marshall Islands	Majuro	Marshall Islands	1993
USP Nauru	Yaren	Nauru	1987
USP Niue	Alofi	Niue	1972
USP Samoa	Apia	Samoa	
USP Solomon Islands	Honiara	Solomon Islands	
USP Tokelau	Fakaofo	Tokelau	1984
USP Tonga	Nukuʻalofa	Tonga	1971
USP Tuvalu	Funafuti	Tuvalu	1970

== Faculties and courses ==
After undergoing a restructuring process in early 2021, USP is organised into eight main faculties that include the following disciplines:

- School of Accounting, Finance and Economics (SAFE)
  - Accounting & Finance
  - Economics
- School of Business and Management (SBM)
  - Tourism & Hospitality Management
  - Management and Public Administration
  - Land Management & Development
  - Graduate School of Business
- School of Information Technology, Engineering, Mathematics and Physics (STEMP)
  - Engineering and Physics
  - Computing, Information & Mathematical Science
- School of Agriculture, Geography, Environment, Ocean and Natural Sciences (SAGEONS)
  - Agriculture & Food Technology
  - Biological & Chemical Sciences
  - Geography, Earth Science and Environment
  - Marine Studies
- School of Law and Social Sciences (SoLaSS)
  - Law
  - Government, Development & International Affairs
  - Social Sciences
- School of Pacific Arts, Communication and Education (SPACE)
  - Education
  - Language, Arts & Media
  - Oceania Centre for Arts, Culture & Pacific Studies
- Pacific Centre for Environment and Sustainable Development (PACE-SD)
- Pacific TAFE (PTAFE)
  - College of Foundation Studies
  - College of Continuing Vocational Education and Training (CVET). Among many other qualifications, the Diploma of Library and Information Services (Level 5) is available at this institution, a library technician qualification which is recognised in Australia as a paraprofessional library qualification.

== Notable academics and staff ==
- Marjorie Crocombe – author
- Ron Crocombe – father of Pacific Studies
- Sitiveni Halapua – politician
- Epeli Hauʻofa – anthropologist/sociologist/social scientist
- Elisabeth Holland – climate scientist
- Cynthia Houniuhi - environmental activist and lecturer of law
- Brij Lal – historian
- Biman Prasad – politician
- Mahendra Reddy – politician
- Ganesh Chand – politician
- Tupeni Baba – politician
- Teleiai Lalotoa Mulitalao – lawyer
- Virginia Tilley – political scientist
- Konai Helu Thaman – poet and educator
- Albert Wendt – novelist and literary scholar
- Subramani – short story writer and literary scholar

== Notable alumni ==
USP has produced a number of graduates that have played important roles in the South Pacific region. Its alumni include Mark Brown, Prime Minister of the Cook Islands, Elizabeth Iro, WHO Chief Nursing Officer, Ludwig Scotty, former President of Nauru; Bikenibeu Paeniu, former Prime Minister of Tuvalu; ʻAkilisi Pōhiva, former Prime Minister of Tonga; Joe Natuman, former Prime Minister of Vanuatu; archaeologist Tarisi Vunidilo, Solomon Islands women's activist Alice Pollard, women's rights activist Michelle Reddy, environmental activist Cynthia Houniuhi, Tongan environmental scientist Netatua Pelesikoti, Solomon Islands Permanent Secretary of the Ministry of Foreign Affairs and External Trade, Colin Beck, and Vanuatu's first female Attorney General, Angelyne Roy.

== Contemporary Pacific Art Collection ==
USP has a large Contemporary Pacific Art collection, including works by Rennie Peyroux, Mike Tavioni, Eruera Nia, Ian George, Kay George, Mahiriki Tangaroa, Apii Rongo, Varu Samuel, Krick Barraud, Joan Gragg, Nanette Lela'ulu, Johnny Penisula, Filipe Tohi, Sam Thomas and Dominique Crocombe.

== See also ==
- List of universities in Polynesia

== Sources ==
- Charles Morris (1966). Report of the Higher Education Mission to the South Pacific. London: Ministry of Overseas Development – via Internet Archive.
- Crocombe, R. G.; Meleisea, Malama, eds. (1988). Pacific Universities: Achievements, Problems, Prospects. University of the South Pacific.
- Leckie, Jacqueline, ed. (2018). A University for the Pacific, 50 Years of USP. Suva: University of the South Pacific.
- Kessler, K.A. Anthropology at the University of the South Pacific: From past dynamics to present perceptions. Aust J Anthropol. 2021;32:33– 53. https://doi.org/10.1111/ taja.12388
- Long, Maebh; Hayward, Matthew (2024). The Rise of Pacific Literature: Decolonization, Radical Campuses, and Modernism. Columbia University Press.
