= Alisa Pham =

Youngest university graduate in NZ

Alisa Pham (also known by her Vietnamese name Phạm Vi An) is a Vietnamese-born academic prodigy and university graduate residing in New Zealand. She is the youngest student to attend Auckland University of Technology (AUT), at age 11 in 2022, and to graduate with a bachelor's degree, at age 14 in December 2024. Pham has officially been recognised as a Top 100 Child Prodigy Globally in Education, as nominated by the Global Child Prodigy Awards at the House of Commons, London in June 2025.

== Early life and school ==
Pham was born in Hanoi, Vietnam, and raised in Ho Chi Minh City, where she attended a Catholic kindergarten. Pham attended Year 1 to 2 in Vietnam, prior to visiting New Zealand with her family in 2017, where they eventually stayed. She started her primary school studies at St Thomas's School in Auckland city, skipping Year 3 and beginning as a Year 4 student.

In 2020, at the age of 9, Pham became a provisional member of Mensa New Zealand, part of Mensa International – a high IQ society open to individuals who score in the top 2% of the population on approved intelligence tests. Membership in Mensa is considered a recognition of intellectual ability.

By early 2021, Pham enrolled at Selwyn College after taking a test on Literacy and Mathematics. She became the youngest student in the school's history to begin Year 9 in an accelerated class program at age 10 after skipping Years 6 through 8. In December of that year, she received her University Entrance Qualification, which requires 80 credits through completion of the New Zealand National Certificate of Educational Achievement (NCEA) Level 3. She achieved this through self studying Year 11, 12 and 13 materials. With this result, Pham was accepted by five different universities, but pursued Auckland University of Technology (AUT) after passing a private interview with the University Board related to health, safety and wellbeing conduct.

Pham commenced studies at Auckland University of Technology (AUT) in March 2022 at the age of 11, pursuing a Bachelor of Communication Studies. In 2022 at age 12, Pham represented Vietnam at the International Blockchain Olympiad (IBCOL), where she received multiple awards, including the Award of Distinction, a Secondary Tier Bronze Medal, and a Bronze Medal in the UN Sustainable Development Goal 4 category.

== University education ==
Pham graduated from AUT in December 2024 at the age of 14, becoming the youngest university graduate in New Zealand and the youngest Vietnamese person known to hold a bachelor's degree.

Pham was recently awarded by the Global Child Prodigy Awards as one of the Top 100 Child Prodigies worldwide in the category of Education. This award was presented at the House of Commons, London.

As of now, she is pursuing dual postgraduate degrees: a remote Master of Psychology at Harvard University and a Master of Philosophy with research focused on Artificial Intelligence, Cybersecurity, and Artificial Social Intelligence at AUT.

== Personal life ==
Outside of school, Pham dedicates time to art, squash, swimming, various social community activities such as charity and dance competition. She has been donating books to Vietnam through Compassion Books (Tủ Sách Nhân Ái) and was a co-founder with her sister of the House of Wisdom New Zealand (Ngôi Nhà Trí Tuệ New Zealand), a charity organisation promoting lifelong learning and soft skill education, in 2020.

== Media coverage ==
Pham has received widespread national and international media attention for her academic achievements. In New Zealand, she has been featured multiple times on New Zealand national television, including TVNZ's 7 Sharp, the AM Show, and various news features across major newspaper outlets. She was also invited to speak at The Hits Jono and Ben Breakfast Radio. In Vietnam, her story has been broadcast on Vietnamese national television channels such as VTV3 on the popular Cà Phê Sáng morning show, VTV 1, and VTV24.
