= Masasso Pāunga =

Tongan academic

Minister of Labor, Commerce & Industries
- In office 1996 – 26 August 2004
- Prime Minister: Baron Vaea ʻUlukālala Lavaka Ata
- Preceded by: Tutoatasi Fakafanua

Minister of Tourism
- In office 1996 – 26 August 2004
- Preceded by: Tutoatasi Fakafanua

Giulio Masasso Tu’ikolongahau Pāunga is a Tongan civil servant, academic, and former Cabinet Minister, who served as Tonga's minister for labour and tourism from 1996 to 2004. In February 2025 he was appointed vice-chancellor of Tonga National University.

Pāunga was educated at Wesleyan University in the United States, before completing a PhD in economics at Daito Bunka University in Japan. He worked as an assistant teacher at Tonga College before moving to Tonga's Central Planning Department. In 1996 he was appointed Minister of Labor, Commerce & Industries and Tourism in the cabinet of Baron Vaea. He retained his cabinet position under ʻUlukālala Lavaka Ata, but was sacked in 2004.

Pāunga moved to the University of the South Pacific, where he worked as Deputy Vice Chancellor and Vice President for Regional Campuses and Global Engagement. In February 2021, following the deportation of vice-chancellor Pal Ahluwalia by the behest of the Fijian government, Pāunga was appointed acting vice-chancellor.

In February 2025 he was appointed vice-chancellor of Tonga National University.
