= New Zealand Scholarship =

New Zealand secondary school award

New Zealand Scholarship is a New Zealand secondary school award, awarded to a limited number of students, that provides financial support for study at a New Zealand university. It is awarded by assessing candidates against challenging standards through an examination or, in the case of some subjects, submission of a portfolio and/or report. Successful candidates have the potential to receive as much as $10,000 per year over three years depending on the class of award that they achieve. It is highly competitive as only 3% of the number of students studying a subject at NCEA Level 3 are able to achieve a passing grade on the scholarship assessment. New Zealand Scholarship is administered by the New Zealand Qualifications Authority (NZQA), alongside the National Certificate of Educational Achievement (NCEA). It is sometimes referred to as NCEA Level 4, sitting at Level 4 on the New Zealand Qualifications Framework.

In 2020, 10,433 students were entered into New Zealand Scholarship assessments. There were 20,095 individual subject entries. Only 13,110 of these were marked and graded as some were absent or void. 2,151 students received a Scholarship award of some form.

== History ==
The first scholarship examination by the University of New Zealand was held in May 1872. After 1962, scholarships were awarded by the Universities Entrance Board. The New Zealand Qualifications Authority took over the work of the Universities Entrance Board in 1991.

From 1989 to 2003 scholarships were awarded to the top 3-4% of Bursary students. In response to the removal of separate scholarship examinations a group of teachers set up their own scholarship exam, later becoming the New Zealand Educational Scholarships Trust (NZEST).

A "NCEA Level 4" qualification was proposed in the 1998 Cabinet paper "Qualifications for Young People Aged 16 to 19 Years" and the discussions that ensued concluded that there be an external examination and that scholarships be awarded. New Zealand Scholarship exams started in 2004. NZEST stopped its examinations and now provides financial assistance for students studying at NZ universities.

The 2004 examinations, in line with the NCEA, were criterion-referenced and produced some unexpected results distributions. Several reviews of the award and a media and political debate followed. The Scholarship examination was largely revamped. Scholarships in 2005 were awarded to the top three per cent of NCEA Level 3 candidates in the subject, given that examiners are satisfied a worthy standard has been met. Monetary awards were restructured and credit value was removed from the examinations.

== Award ==
All monetary values are in the New Zealand dollar.

The number of passing grades awarded in each scholarship subject is set at approximately 3% of the size of the Level 3 Cohort. The Level 3 Cohort is the number of students who achieve 14+ credits in the NCEA Level 3 equivalent of said subject. There are two types of passing grade, Scholarship (S) and Outstanding (O). A common misconception is that passing grades are only awarded to 3% of the students who sit the scholarship assessment, rather than 3% of the total Level 3 cohort. However, as evidenced by the ratio of entries to scholarship passes, the actual percentage of entries that pass is much higher than 3%. In 2020, for example, 37.2% of assessed entries received either an S or O passing grade in English, and 21% in Calculus.

There are six classes of monetary award:

- The Premier Award is awarded to the very top 7 to 12 Candidates. The minimum eligibility requirement to be considered for this award is achievement of at least three Scholarships at "Outstanding" level in the same year. The number of recipients for this award is restricted and achieving the minimum requirement will not guarantee an award. It is worth $10,000 each year for up to three years for as long as the recipient maintains at least a 'B' grade average each year of their tertiary study.
- An Outstanding Scholar Award is awarded to the next top 40 to 60 candidates. The minimum eligibility requirement to be considered for this award is achievement of three Scholarships including at least two at "Outstanding" level in the same year, or more than three Scholarships including at least one at "Outstanding" level in the same year. The number of recipients for this award is restricted and achieving the minimum requirement will not guarantee an award. It is worth $5,000 each year for up to three years for as long as the recipient maintains at least a 'B' grade average each year of their tertiary study.
- A Scholarship Award is awarded to candidates who achieve New Zealand Scholarship in three or more subjects in the same year and for Candidates who achieve two Scholarships at "Outstanding" level in the same year. It is worth $2,000 each year for up to three years for as long as the recipient maintains at least a 'B' grade average each year of their tertiary study.
- A Top Subject Scholar Award is awarded to the top Candidate in each one of the New Zealand Scholarship subjects. It is worth $2,000 each year for up to three years for as long as the recipient maintains at least a 'B' grade average each year of their tertiary study.
- A Single Subject Award is awarded to candidates who achieve New Zealand Scholarship in one or more subjects. It is a 'one-off' award of $500 per subject, for up to two subjects, (maximum payment $1000).
- The Prime Minister's Award is awarded to the Candidate who has attained the best results of all Premier Award recipients, taking into account the number of New Zealand Scholarships achieved at "Outstanding" level, the number of additional New Zealand Scholarships achieved, and the ranking of Candidates within individual subjects.

Generally, students meeting the criteria for more than one award receive the award with the highest monetary value. However, students receiving a Top Subject Scholar Award, who also achieve Scholarship in another subject, also receive a Single Subject Award.

== Assessment ==
Scholarship subjects are assessed through a written exam lasting three hours, with some exceptions. Dance, Design, Design and Visual Communication, Music, Painting, Photography, Printmaking, and Sculpture are instead assessed through submission of portfolios of work. Health & Physical Education and Technology are instead assessed through submitted reports. Assessments for language subjects also involve recorded speaking; the same is true for Dance, Drama, and Music but with a recorded performance.

To be able to enter New Zealand Scholarship, students only have to be enrolled in a consented New Zealand secondary school. This means that, while it is usually Year 13 students who enter, some Year 12 students undertake Scholarship as well. Sometimes, Year 11 students also enter.

Due to the competitive nature of New Zealand Scholarship, there is no derived grade process if a student is unable to sit the exam. However, NZQA has the power to postpone Scholarship exams in case of national-level disruption. This happened in 2016, when the Scholarship History and Chemistry exams scheduled for 14 November were postponed due to the M7.8 Kaikōura earthquake earlier that morning.

== Subjects ==
Scholarship Subjects (2020)
Scholarship Subject	Assessment Method	NCEA Level 3 Cohort	S Grades	O Grades	Passing Grades as a Percentage of the Cohort	Scholarship Entries	Entries as a Percentage of the Cohort	Assessed Results	Passing Grades as a Percentage of Assessed Results
Accounting	Written Examination	1,863	53	6	3.2%	300	16.1%	195	30.3%
Agriculture and Horticulture	Written Examination	496	13	2	3%	80	16.13%	59	25.4%
Art History	Written Examination	840	24	3	3.2%	217	25.83%	132	20.5%
Biology	Written Examination	9,616	277	29	3.2%	1,588	16.51%	1,109	27.6%
Calculus	Written Examination	9,016	247	29	3.1%	1,730	19.19%	1,317	21%
Chemistry	Written Examination	8,908	159	28	2.1%	1,632	18.32%	1,030	18.1%
Chinese	Written Examination and Recorded Speaking	790	21	3	3%	290	36.7%	201	11.9%
Classical Studies	Written Examination	2,995	81	9	3%	486	16.23%	329	27.3%
Dance	Portfolio of Work and Recorded Performance	997	13	3	1.6%	124	12.44%	71	22.5%
Design	Portfolio of Work	2,316	63	7	3%	505	21.8%	259	27%
Design and Visual Communication	Portfolio of Work	1,328	39	4	3.2%	377	28.39%	336	12.8%
Drama	Written Examination and Recorded Performance	1,936	54	5	3%	380	19.63%	197	29.9
Earth and Space Science	Written Examination	939	25	3	3%	247	26.3%	169	16.6%
Economics	Written Examination	2,806	75	9	3%	573	20.42%	413	20.4%
English	Written Examination	15,624	424	45	3%	1,970	12.61%	1,263	37.4%
French	Written Examination and Recorded Speaking	479	13	2	3.1%	106	22.13%	92	16.3%
Geography	Written Examination	4,734	126	15	3%	995	21.02%	702	20%
German	Written Examination and Recorded Speaking	217	5	2	3.2%	31	14.29%	26	26.9%
Health and Physical Education	Submitted Report	4,482	115	12	2.8%	847	18.9%	313	40.5%
History	Written Examination	6,240	153	18	2.7%	1,189	19.05%	793	21.6%
Japanese	Written Examination and Recorded Speaking	526	15	2	3.2%	169	32.13%	132	12.9%
Latin	Written Examination and Recorded Speaking	35	3	1	11.4%	41	117.14%	33	12.1%
Media Studies	Written Examination	2,437	70	7	3.2%	442	18.14%	246	31.3%
Music	Portfolio of Work and Recorded Performance	1,630	46	5	3.1	444	27.24%	306	16.6%
Painting	Portfolio of Work	2,912	78	9	3%	575	19.75%	317	27.4%
Photography	Portfolio of Work	2,870	77	9	3%	458	15.96%	224	38.4%
Physics	Written Examination	8,586	232	27	3%	1,670	19.45%	1,099	23.6%
Printmaking	Portfolio of Work	414	11	1	2.9%	84	20.29%	41	29.2%
Religious Studies	Written Examination	2,600	68	6	2.8%	484	18.62%	267	27.7%
Samoan	Written Examination and Recorded Speaking	315	9	1	3.2%	90	28.57%	59	17%
Sculpture	Portfolio of Work	183	5	1	3.3%	56	30.6%	20	30%
Spanish	Written Examination and Recorded Speaking	419	12	1	3.1%	102	24.34%	79	16.5%
Statistics	Written Examination	9,659	277	29	3.2%	1,227	12.7%	909	33.7%
Te Reo Māori	Written Examination and Recorded Speaking	949	28	2	3.2%	145	15.28%	93	32.3%
Te Reo Rangatira	Written Examination and Recorded Speaking	182	10	1	6%	82	45.05%	51	21.6%
Technology	Submitted Report	3,700	67	10	2.1%	359	9.7%	228	33.8%

== See also ==
- New Zealand Qualifications Authority (website) (awarding body)
- New Zealand Educational Scholarships Trust
- Press release 15 December 2003 detailing prizes
