= Mensa New Zealand =

Mensa New Zealand is a branch of Mensa International, a society for individuals who score at the 98th percentile or above on a standardised, supervised IQ or other approved intelligence test.

Mensa was founded in the United Kingdom in 1946. The New Zealand branch was established in 1966, holding its first meeting in Wellington. As of 2023, there were around 500 members of Mensa New Zealand. One of Mensa New Zealand's youngest members is Alisa Pham, New Zealand's youngest university graduate. New Zealand Mensans often keep their membership private, with one testing officer noting in 2012: "New Zealand is wonderful for gifted athletes or people who are gifted artistically but really we don't do much for people with intellectual gifts". [...] "Being very intelligent is like being very unintelligent. The whole world is made for the average and if you are not average it can be difficult."

In 2024, members were the focus of a New Zealand study into the role of Resource Teachers: Learning and Behaviour (RTLB) in gifted education.

Mensa New Zealand publishes a monthly newsletter, Menzed, for members. It contains letters and articles on many subjects, puzzles, and news about events in New Zealand and overseas. Area coordinators in each region organise meetups for their local members, and national gatherings are held several times a year so that members from all around New Zealand have a chance to connect and enjoy various activities.
