= Colin Aikman =

New Zealand public servant, lawyer and diplomat

Colin Aikman CBE
- Born: Colin Campbell Aikman; 24 August 1919
- Died: 22 December 2002 (aged 83)
- Citizenship: New Zealand

Colin Campbell Aikman CBE (24 August 1919 – 22 December 2002) was a New Zealand public servant, lawyer and diplomat. He was professor of jurisprudence and constitutional law at Victoria University of Wellington between 1955 and 1968; first Vice Chancellor of the University of the South Pacific in Suva, Fiji; and New Zealand's High Commissioner to India and Bangladesh and Ambassador to Nepal between 1975 and 1978.

He reported on the Nuremberg trials for the New Zealand government and spoke for New Zealand at the UN when the Universal Declaration of Human Rights was adopted.

Aikman was awarded the Queen Elizabeth II Silver Jubilee Medal in 1977. In the 1990 Queen's Birthday Honours, he was appointed a Commander of the Order of the British Empire, for services to law and education.

Aikman's daughter, Helen Aikman (6 December 1955 – 8 January 2012) was a Queen's Counsel.
