= Elisabeth Holland =

American climate scientist

- Education: Colorado State University
- Known for: Climate Change Research and Outreach
- Awards: 2003, NCAR Leadership Academy; 2005, Leopold Fellow; 2007, Women of Achievement Award by the Zonta Foothills Club of Boulder County; 2007, Shared the Nobel Peace Prize; Lead author of the IPCC assessment 2010, NCAR Faculty Fellowship
- Scientific career
- Fields: Biogeochemistry and Climate Studies
- Workplaces: Colorado State University; University of Colorado; Stanford University; Bjerknes Center for Climate Research; University of the South Pacific; University College London
- Website: https://pace.usp.ac.fj/staff-profiles/elisabeth/

Elisabeth Holland is an American climate scientist who focuses on how the carbon and nitrogen cycles interact with earth systems. She was a key player in the international climate debate. She is currently a professor of climate change at the University of the South Pacific and a Distinguished Research Fellow at the Institute for Strategy, Resilience & Security at University College London. She was also the director of the Pacific Center for Environmental and Sustainable Development at USP until 2023.

== Early life and education ==
Holland grew up in the deserts of New Mexico. Her father was an engineer and a scientist. She grew up using scientific instruments and developed a curiosity for the world around her. However, she was not immediately interested in oceans. Holland did not even see her first ocean until she was sixteen. She attended Colorado State University (CSU) in Fort Collins. Here she earned her B.S. in zoology and an M.S. in soil sciences. In 1985, Holland finished her masters' thesis: "Crop residue placement on soil processes." In 1989 she completed her Ph.D. in ecology and environmental sciences at CSU. Her thesis is titled: Plant carbon allocation and nitrogen cycling in a perennial grassland: The role of herbivory." Her interests were not purely academic. While in Colorado she pursued rock climbing, whitewater kayaking, and was even a glider pilot. After completing her Ph.D. Holland served as a post-doctoral fellow at Stanford.

== Career and research ==
Holland works on understanding the interactions between the carbon cycle, nitrogen cycle, and the earth system. She worked for the National Centre for Atmospheric Research (NCAR). She worked as a senior scientist and became the leader of the Biogeosciences program at NCAR. She studied how atmospheric composition effects ecosystems on earth, especially in the context of climate change.

In Boulder, Colorado Holland served as graduate faculty at CU Boulder for the Environmental, Organismic Biology, and Atmospheric and Ocean Sciences department. She is also a member of the graduate faculty at Colorado State University. While in Colorado, she studied nitrogen and methane content in alpine soil. She also looked at controls of nitrogen emission from Colorado steppe soils. She was a fellow with the Natural Resource Ecology Lab at CSU and the Institute for Arctic and Alpine Ecology at CU Boulder. At the Max Planck Institute for Biogeochemistry, Holland served as a professor and senior research scientist. Holland helped author the article "Climatic, edaphic, and biotic controls over storage and turnover of carbon in soils." This article examined the amount of carbon stored in soil, the residence time of carbon in soil, and the ratios of carbon to nitrogen. She found that there is a positive correlation between carbon content and clay content. She also concluded that increased temperature releases nitrogen, which is available to flora. This increases the amount of carbon taken in by plants by around 100%.

Holland moved away from research and began work the Intergovernmental Panel on Climate Change (IPCC). She has served as a representative for the United States, Germany, and currently represents Fiji. She is a listed author on four of the IPCC’s climate assessment reports. Holland worked to communicate her science to policymakers. She believes that communication is one of the most important aspects of science.

In 2012, Holland accepted a position at the University of the South Pacific (USP) as a professor of Climate Change. The following year she became the Director of the Pacific Center for Environment and Sustainable Development at USP, a post she held until 2023. She uses science, policy, and tradition to prepare for, and fight, the coming impacts of climate change on South Pacific nations.

== Awards and honors ==
- 2007, The Intergovernmental Panel on Climate Change (IPCC) was the co-recipient of the Nobel Peace Prize. Authoring several climate assessment reports, Holland was a key member of the IPCC.
- 2007, Women of Achievement Award by the Zonta Foothills Club of Boulder County.
- 2005, Leopold Fellow. The Leopold Leadership Program operates through the Stanford Woods Institute for the Environment.
- 2003, NCAR Leadership Academy, 2003
- 2010, NCAR Faculty Fellowship

== Publications ==
- “Couplings between changes in the climate system and biogeochemistry”, 2007, IPCC’s Climate Assessment Report.
- “Climatic, edaphic, and biotic controls over storage and turnover of carbon in soils”, 1994, Global Biogeochemical Cycles.
- “Long term sensitivity of soil carbon turnover to warming,” 2005, Nature: Journal of International Science.
- Consistent Land- and Atmosphere-Based U.S. Carbon Sink Estimates”, 2001, Science.
- “Nutrient Imbalances in Agricultural Development”, 2009, Science.

== Public engagement ==
Holland is involved in protecting the rights of Pacific island states. She works with these nations to develop climate change action plans. Holland also joined the Fijian delegation at the 2017 United Nations Climate Change Conference (COP23).
