= Rajesh Chandra =

Fijian academic of Indian descent

Rajesh Chandra was a Fijian academic. In February 2005 he was appointed the first Vice-Chancellor of the newly founded University of Fiji. He served as Vice-Chancellor and President of The University of the South Pacific (USP) ending his term in December 2018. After his retirement, he was appointed the Chancellor of Fiji National University, holding office from April 2019 until January 2020 when he stepped down for medical reasons. He died on 16 November 2023 after a long illness.

== University of the South Pacific career ==
Chandra served on the staff of the University of the South Pacific (USP), the South Pacific Islands regional university, from 1975 to 2005, before taking up the Vice-Chancellorship of the new University of Fiji. He was Deputy Vice-Chancellor at the USP for nine years, and also served for three years as Acting Vice-Chancellor, Pro-Vice-Chancellor (Academic), and Director of Planning and Development. From 1987 to 1988, he was Head of the School of Social and Economic Development, and from 1994 to 1996, of the Geography Department. In early June 2013, USP's council cleared Chandra of allegations (based on a petition circulated by a group called USP-devoted IE for Justice) of corruption and abuse of authority.

After retiring from USP in December 2018, Chandra's successor, Professor Pal Ahluwalia, alleged he had found evidence of significant abuse of office during Chandra's tenure. This included the promotion and overpayment of favoured managers and the systematic abuse of allowances and privileges, amounting to millions of dollars. The matter was investigated by New Zealand accounting firm BDO, which substantiated many of the allegations but the report was suppressed by the USP Council. The subsequent scandal over poor governance and mismanagement was widely documented in the international media. The University Council decided to move the headquarters of USP from Fiji to Samoa in protest at the Fiji Government's interference in the management of the regional institution.
