= Teleiai Lalotoa Mulitalao =

Samoan civil servant

Teleiai Lalotoa Mulitalao (born 1969 or 1970) is a Samoan lawyer and civil servant who served as legal counsel to the Parliament of Samoa and director of the Samoa Law Reform Commission.

Teleiai was educated at the University of the South Pacific and Australian National University. She worked as a court officer, and then for Samoa's Office of the Attorney General, before gaining a PhD at the University of Queensland. After working in Australia, she became a law lecturer at the University of the South Pacific's school of law in Vanuatu, then worked as legal counsel for the Parliament of Samoa.

In 2016 she was appointed director of the Samoa Law Reform Commission, succeeding Leota Theresa Potoi. In 2017 she was one of three winners of the Greg Urwin award for outstanding Pacific Islanders.

In September 2022 she retired from the Samoa Law Reform Commission.

In April 2023 she took up a position as Legislative Drafting Advisor for the Solomon Islands.
