= New Zealand University Bursary =

The New Zealand University Entrance, Bursaries and Scholarships, more commonly known as Bursary, was a former New Zealand secondary school qualification obtained by Year 13 (Form 7), and sometimes, Year 12 (Form 6), secondary school students. Bursary was used to qualify students for entrance to university, award of bursaries and/or scholarship grades.

Up to six subjects could be taken, and depending on which, assessment could involve internal projects and/or a national examination undertaken near the end of the school year. Some examples include: Physical Education (PE), which was fully internally assessed, with external moderation (conducted by New Zealand Qualifications Authority); Biology, which included internally assessed components, as well as a national exam; or Practical Art, which was assessed on a folio of work submitted for national assessment.

To gain a Bursary, students had to achieve an aggregate score of at least 250 from up to five Bursary subjects; each subject marked out of 100 with Art counting as a double-subject. An 'A' Bursary was awarded to candidates achieving a total score of 300 or higher, while 'B' Bursaries were awarded for scores between 250 and 299. To gain University Entrance via the Bursaries Examinations, students were required to get a 'C' grade or better in at least three subjects. Candidates who did not get an 'A' or 'B' Bursary had their Bursary scores count toward University Entrance provided their subjects scored at least 40%. Between 1989 and 2003, those coming in the top 3–4% of their subject also won a scholarship, whereas previously Scholarship had required entering additional examinations.

External examination results were scaled not only to ensure consistency from subject to subject and year to year, but, more controversially, also so that only 50% of the nationwide candidates achieved an 'A' or 'B' Bursary.

In 2004, the Bursary was replaced by the National Certificate of Educational Achievement at Level 3 and scholarships by the New Zealand Scholarship.

This qualification was awarded by the New Zealand Universities Entrance Board until 1990 and then was awarded by the New Zealand Qualifications Authority until Bursary's demise.

== See also ==
- History of education in New Zealand
