= School Certificate (New Zealand) =

Former educational qualification in New Zealand

The New Zealand School Certificate or School Certificate was an examination-based New Zealand secondary-school qualification for high-school students in Year 11 (Form 5) from 1946 until 2002.

== Qualification details ==
Originally to gain School Certificate proper, students had to achieve an average score of at least 50 percent and a "C" grade (50–64%) or better in all subjects (including English and mathematics). Latterly this changed to three subjects and by the final years of school certificate, students could progress to the sixth form (year 12) if they narrowly missed these criteria but had an overall score of 180 in their top four subjects. This was at the discretion of the school.

Some subjects were a mixture of internal and external assessments. Internal assessment increased in later years. Subjects such as art, music and design technology were internally assessed by the school and nationally moderated. Originally internal exams were adjusted and scaled to ensure only 50% of students gained a "C" grade or higher. Latterly they were adjusted and scaled to make them consistent with results from other schools nationwide.

An "A" School Certificate was awarded to candidates achieving scores between 80–100 percent and "B" School Certificates were awarded for scores between 65–79 percent. Students attaining five or more A grades received a special certificate acknowledging their achievement.

== History ==
School Certificate was awarded by the Ministry of Education until 1991, and then by the New Zealand Qualifications Authority until 2002 when it was replaced by the National Certificate of Educational Achievement (NCEA) at Level 1.

== See also ==
- History of education in New Zealand
- Sixth Form Certificate
- School Certificate (United Kingdom)
- School Certificate (New South Wales)
