= Tonga National University =

University in Tonga

Coordinates: 21°8′33.28″S 175°12′12.42″W

Tonga National University is a university in Tonga. It was established by an act of parliament in 2021, and was formed by merging existing government training institutes. It will formally open on 27 January 2023. The university's campus is at Pahu in Nukuʻalofa.

The chancellor of the university is King Tupou VI.

== History ==
The Tongan government announced plans for a national university in August 2021. Legislation establishing the university was introduced to the Legislative Assembly of Tonga and passed the same year. The Act formally merged the government-owned Tonga Institute of Education, Tonga Institute of Higher Education, Tonga Institute of Science and Technology, Tonga Maritime Polytech Institute, Queen Salote Institute of Nursing and Allied Health and Tonga Police College to form a single institution. It defined the objectives of the university as preserving, extending and disseminating knowledge in Tonga through teaching, research, scholarship; providing academic, technical, and vocational training and continuing education; fostering and facilitating the study of the Tongan language and culture and other subjects of relevance to Tonga; and facilitating the economic and the social development of Tonga.

On 11 January 2023 Prime Minister Siaosi Sovaleni announced that the university will formally open on 27 January 2023. It was officially opened by crown prince Tupoutoʻa ʻUlukalala on 20 January 2023.

In February 2025 Dr Masasso Pāunga was appointed vice-chancellor.

== Faculties and courses ==
The university will initially offer five bachelor's degrees, in primary and secondary education, computer science, tourism, and agricultural studies. It will also include nursing studies.

== See also ==
- National University of Samoa
- Fiji National University
