= Pal Ahluwalia =

Kenyan academic

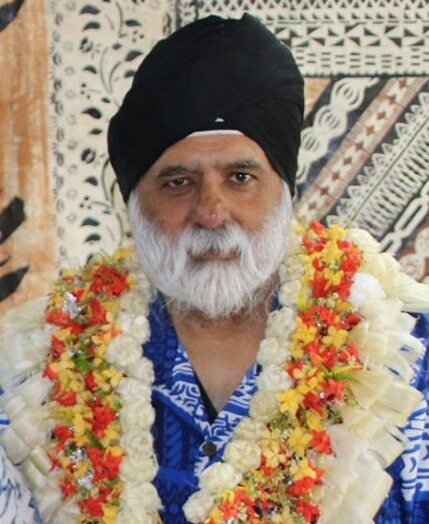
Ahluwalia in 2020

Pal Ahluwalia is a Kenyan academic and the former Vice-Chancellor of University of the South Pacific.

Ahluwalia was born in Nairobi, Kenya, and educated at the University of Saskatchewan in Canada and Flinders University in Australia. He worked as a professor of politics at the University of Adelaide and then as Pro Vice-Chancellor and Acting Deputy Vice-Chancellor at the University of South Australia. In October 2014 he was appointed Pro Vice-Chancellor at the University of Portsmouth. In June 2018, Ahluwalia was appointed Vice-Chancellor of the University of the South Pacific.

== Dispute with Fijian Government ==
In 2019, Ahluwalia raised concerns about mismanagement and abuse of office at USP under the leadership of the previous Vice-Chancellor, Rajesh Chandra. An investigation by New Zealand accounting firm BDO substantiated the allegations, and the report was subsequently leaked online. In June 2020, a special council meeting led by Pro-Chancellor Winston Thompson suspended Ahluwalia for unspecified "misconduct". Staff protesting the suspension were questioned by Fijian police. On 19 June Ahluwalia was reinstated by a full meeting of the USP council, and the allegations against him were dismissed in September 2020.

The Fijian government refused to accept Ahluwalia's exoneration, and on 24 September 2020 halted all funding to the university. On 4 February 2021, the Fijian government summarily deported Vice-Chancellor Ahluwalia for being "a person who is or has been conducting himself in a manner prejudicial to the peace, defence, public safety, public order, public morality, public health, security or good government of the Fiji Islands". On 25 May the university's council issued a new three-year contract to Ahluwalia and relocate the Vice-Chancellor's office to the Alafua Campus in Apia, Samoa. In August 2021 the Fijian government announced that it would not fund the university as long as Ahluwalia was vice-chancellor.

Following the 2022 Fijian general election, the new government led by Sitiveni Rabuka revoked the prohibition order on Ahluwalia, allowing him to return to Fiji.

Ahluwalia resigned from USP in September 2025

== Publications ==
- Politics and Post-colonial Theory: African Inflections
- Post-colonialism and the Politics of Kenya
- Plantations and the Politics of Sugar in Uganda
- "Post-structuralism's colonial roots: Michel Foucault". Social Identities (2010)
- Out of Africa: Post-structuralism's colonial roots (Routledge, 2010)
