= Sixth Form Certificate =

Former educational qualification in New Zealand

Sixth Form Certificate was a New Zealand secondary school qualification gained at the end of Year 12 (Form 6) that was awarded until 2002. The system was assessed internally.

Sixth Form Certificate was originally developed to allow schools to provide a more comprehensive range of courses than was available from University Entrance subjects. Sixth Form Certificate was internally assessed by schools. Students were awarded "1" for "an excellent level of achievement" in a subject down to "9" for low levels of achievement. The number of 1s, 2s, 3s etc. available for allocation to students were based on the school's previous year's School Certificate results and were not transferred if a student changed schools. These grades were then allocated to the students. A Grade 5 was considered a minimum pass at Sixth Form level while a Grade 6 or 7 was the equivalent of a School Certificate level pass in that subject. The pre-allocation of grades available meant that the quality of teaching had no bearing on the overall results of a class.

The grades were allocated as follows:

Grade	Proportion of students
1	top 4%
2	next 6%
3	.. 10%
4	.. 17%
5	.. 22%
6	.. 22%
7	.. 12%
8	.. 6%
9	.. 1%

Sixth Form Certificate has been replaced by the National Certificate of Educational Achievement at level 2.

== See also ==
- History of education in New Zealand
