= National Certificate of Educational Achievement =

Official secondary school qualification in New Zealand

The National Certificate of Educational Achievement (NCEA) is the official secondary-school qualification in New Zealand. Phased in between 2002 and 2004, it replaced three older secondary-school qualifications. The New Zealand Qualifications Authority administers NCEA.

In early August 2025, the Sixth National Government confirmed plans to scrap NCEA and replace it with new school certificates.

== History ==
NCEA Level 1 replaced School Certificate in 2002, Level 2 replaced Sixth Form Certificate in 2003 and Level 3 replaced Bursary in 2004. A transitional Sixth Form Certificate was offered by schools in 2003 and 2004.

Unlike the previous subjects-based school certificates which ranked students based on their marks, NCEA measures academic performance against set standards. Each of these standards is worth a certain number of credits. NCEA work is assessed both externally through annual national exam at the end of the school year or internally assessed through tests throughout the school year, which are marked by schools. Internal assessment marking is checked by independent moderators from the New Zealand Qualifications Authority (NZQA) to ensure that schools are assessing work according to a national standard.

=== Replacements ===
On 4 August 2025, Prime Minister Christopher Luxon and Education Minister Erica Stanford announced plans to scrap NCEA in favour of new qualifications for Years 11, 12 and 13.

These proposed changes have included:

- Creating a Foundational Skills Award for Year 11 students. Making English, Mathematics and Science compulsory in Year 11.
- Creating a New Zealand Certificate of Education (NZCE) for Year 12 students.
- Creating a New Zealand Advanced Certificate of Education (NZACE) for Year 13 students.
- Replacing NCEA's standards based assessment approach with a structured approach that requires students to choose at least five-subjects in Years 12 and 13. They will need to pass four to earn each certificate.
- A new grading system featuring marks out of 100 alongside a letter grade system from A, B, C, D, E instead of Not achieved, Achieved, Merit & Excellence .
- Working with industry experts to design new subjects and standards for vocational pathways in industries such as construction, hospitality and automotives.

NCEA is expected to be phased out over a five-year period, commencing with the launch of a new national curriculum in 2026, the Foundational Skills Award in 2028, NZCE in 2029 and NZACE in 2030. The replacement system would prevent schools from allowing students to mix standards from different standards and require students to pass four out of five subjects.

In late August 2025, 89 secondary school principals issued an open letter to Education Minister Stanford and Acting Secretary for Education Ellen MacGregor-Reid, calling for the Government to halt plans to replace the NCEA school qualification. They said that the Government's replacement plan lacked a clear rationale and posed a risk to disadvantaged teenagers particularly Māori and Pasifika New Zealanders. The principals expressed concern that the replacement system was designed for university-bound students over non-academic students. In response, Stanford said that she had consulted with the education sector including her advisory group of principals in developing the new secondary school qualification. She reiterated that the Government remained committed to replacing NCEA but sought to reassure principals and schools that there would be a phased, planned and supported implementation of the new qualification framework.

On 26 March 2026, Stanford confirmed that the New Zealand Government would proceed with plans to phase out NCEA between 2028 and 2030. In addition, Year 11 students would be required to study English and mathematics from 2028. The Government also intends to introduce subjects-based assessments for Years 12 and 13 students, phasing out the current practice of accumulating credits across various subjects. The Government plans to create one pathway for academic and vocational learning, with industry-led subjects within the curriculum. In response, Post Primary Teachers' Association President Chris Abercrombie criticised the lack of detail in the Government's March announcement while the PPTA's Secondary School Council chair Steve McCracken expressed concern about the narrow focus on literacy and numeracy in the foundation qualifications for Year 11 students.

On 16 May 2026, Stanford and Luxon announced further details of the Government's NCEA replacements. Under the new system, Year 11 would be required to study English, mathematics and science from 2028 as part of a compulsory literacy and numeracy Foundational Skills Award. The NZCE and NZACE certificates would be introduced from 2029 and 2030, replacing NCEA Levels 2 and 3 respectively. Years 12 and 13 students would be required to study at least five subjects and pass at a minimum of three subjects to gain a qualification. Under the new system, certificates would show the number of subjects and grades a student has achieved, replacing the NCEA system of aggregate credits totals. Luxon confirmed that the Government would abolish fully internally-assessed subjects while Willis said that the new system would avoid "credit crunching" but focus on "progressing students through a curriculum that sets you up for life." In response, the Post Primary Teachers' Association President Chris Abercrombie described the new system as "too rigid" and expressed concern about the requirement for exams across all subjects and the shortage of science teachers. Similarly, the Green Party's education spokesperson Lawrence Xu-Nan said that the "disastrous curriculum and qualification changes" would cause thousands of children leaving school without a qualification. He also expressed concern that standardising assessments would adversely affect Māori, Pasifika, disabled, neurodivergent and rural students.

== System ==
The NCEA system has three levels – one, two, and three – corresponding to their respective levels on the National Qualifications Framework. Each level is generally studied in each of the three final years of secondary schooling, with NCEA Level 1 in Year 11, NCEA Level 2 in Year 12, and NCEA Level 3 in Year 13, although it is not uncommon for students to study across multiple levels.

To pass each level, students must gain a certain number of credits at that level or above. Credits are awarded through students passing unit standards or achievement standards. Each school subject is made up of multiple standards – for example, Mathematics at Level 1 is made up of 13 achievement standards, including separate standards for number, algebra, geometry, trigonometry, statistics and probability.

Unit and achievement standards represent the two kinds of standards used in NCEA. Both use criterion-based marking, which means students need to meet the specified criteria for each grade level to achieve at that level. However, unit standards are 'competency based' whereas achievement standards derive from the New Zealand Curriculum. Most unit standards use a simple Achieved/Not Achieved system, whereas achievement standards use a four-grade scale: Not Achieved (N), Achieved (A), Merit (M) and Excellence (E). Furthermore, each standard is assigned a particular credit value. For instance, Standard 91394 (Analyse ideas and values of the classical world) is worth four credits while Standard 91587 (Apply systems of simultaneous equations in solving problems) is worth 3 credits.

Assessment of individuals is administered both internally and externally. Internal assessments are assessed at the school level throughout the school year. External assessments are assessed at a national level, usually (but not exclusively) by examinations held at the end of the school year in November and December.

=== Achievement and endorsements ===
The number of credits required to pass each level is as follows. Credits can be reused for multiple certificates:

- NCEA Level 1 – 80 credits at Level One or higher, of which 10 must be in literacy and 10 must be in numeracy.
- NCEA Level 2 – 80 credits total, of which 60 credits must be at Level Two or higher. Students must also have achieved 10 literacy and 10 numeracy credits at Level One or higher.
- NCEA Level 3 – 80 credits total, of which 60 credits must be at Level Three or higher and 20 credits must be at Level Two or higher. Students must also have achieved 10 literacy and 10 numeracy credits at Level One or higher.

Candidates who achieve a large number of Merit and Excellence standards can have certificates endorsed with Merit or Excellence. To gain a level certificate with Merit endorsement, a student must pass the level with at least 50 Merit and Excellence credits assessed at that level or higher. Likewise, to gain a level certificate with Excellence endorsement, a student must pass the level with at least 50 Excellence credits assessed at that level or higher.

=== Exam process and marking ===
Grade Score Marking (GSM) was also introduced in 2011, along with the realigned Level One standards. Like the realignment, GSM was phased in so that only Level One externals were marked with GSM in 2011. Under GSM each question earns up to 8 marks, with two marks per each of the grades (NAME). N0 also exists for "no response, no evidence". The Grade Score Marks for each question are totalled and the overall mark for the standard is determined from that total, based on NZQA determined cut-scores. However, candidates would still ultimately receive one of four marks (NAME) whether or not the standard was out of 8 (such as 91098) or 32 (for example, 90948). The rationale behind the change was threefold: it would clarify marks for candidates, motivate them to improve and improve consistency in marking.

According to NZQA, NCEA is the only secondary school qualification worldwide where marked examination papers are returned to students. After the examination papers have been returned, a student can apply for certain papers to be reviewed if a marking or clerical error has occurred (e.g. the paper has not been fully marked, the marks have been added up incorrectly, the examination paper shows a different result from their results notice), or they can apply for certain papers to be remarked ("reconsidered") if they feel they have not been assessed correctly.

Extensive online resources for standards can be found on NZQA's website.

== University entrance ==
For NCEA candidates the prerequisites for the University Entrance award were changed in 2014 for the university year beginning 2015. Candidates have since been required to:

- Achieve NCEA Level 3
- Gain 14 credits in each of three Approved Subjects
- Meet the Literacy and Numeracy standards based on Level Two and Level One credits across a multitude of standards and subjects.

Not all subjects are approved for university admission and, as such, NZQA publishes a list of approved subjects and standards. Credits not gained in approved subjects cannot count towards University Entrance.

Individual universities set their own entrance standards for specific degree programmes, but NCEA students must still meet the University Entrance standard set by NCEA. The only exception to this applies to a discretionary entrance, which is subject to its own requirements. Non-NCEA pupils are admitted by universities based on their qualifications.

NCEA is also accepted internationally, but overseas institutes and countries set their own requirements and NZQA may convert NCEA into comparable measures of performance on a case-by-case basis.

The University Entrance award has been criticised on the grounds that it is 'convoluted', insufficient for admission to New Zealand's universities and seen as inadequate by universities domestic and foreign.

== Subjects ==
=== University approved ===
NZ Curriculum Subject Area	Level 1	Level 2	Level 3
English	English	English	English
Arts	Dance Design (Practical Art) Drama History of Art Music Studies Painting (Practical Art) Photography (Practical Art) Printmaking (Practical Art) Sculpture (Practical Art)	Dance Design (Practical Art) Drama History of Art Music Studies Painting (Practical Art) Photography (Practical Art) Printmaking (Practical Art) Sculpture (Practical Art)	Dance Design (Practical Art) Drama History of Art Music Studies Painting (Practical Art) Photography (Practical Art) Printmaking (Practical Art) Sculpture (Practical Art)
Health and Physical Education	Health Education Home Economics Physical Education	Health Education Home Economics Physical Education	Health Education Home Economics Physical Education
Languages	Chinese Cook Islands Maori French German Indonesian Japanese Korean Latin New Zealand Sign Language Samoan Spanish Tongan	Chinese Cook Islands Maori French German Indonesian Japanese Korean Latin New Zealand Sign Language Samoan Spanish Tongan	Chinese Cook Islands Maori French German Indonesian Japanese Korean Latin New Zealand Sign Language Samoan Spanish Tongan
Mathematics and Statistics	Mathematics	Mathematics	Calculus Mathematics Statistics
Science	Agriculture and Horticultural Science Biology Chemistry Physics Science	Agriculture and Horticultural Science Biology Chemistry Earth and Space Science Physics Science	Agriculture and Horticultural Science Biology Chemistry Earth and Space Science Physics
Social Sciences	Accounting Business Studies Classical Studies Economics Geography History Media Studies Psychology Social Studies	Accounting Business Studies Classical Studies Economics Geography History Media Studies Psychology Social Studies	Accounting Business Studies Classical Studies Economics Geography History Media Studies Psychology Social Studies
Technology	Construction and Mechanical Technologies Design and Visual Communication Digital Technologies Processing Technologies Technology	Construction and Mechanical Technologies Design and Visual Communication Digital Technologies Processing Technologies Technology	Construction and Mechanical Technologies Design and Visual Communication Digital Technologies Processing Technologies Technology
Other	Religious Studies Te Reo Māori Te Reo Rangatira	Education for Sustainability Religious Studies Te Reo Māori Te Reo Rangatira	Education for Sustainability Religious Studies Te Reo Māori Te Reo Rangatira

== Controversy and media ==
=== Data breach ===
In January 2013, hundreds of students were able to access their grades a day before they were due to be released, after they were accidentally posted online.

=== Uneven assessment standards ===
In June 2014 NZQA released a press statement saying that nearly 25% of the 2013 internal assessments were incorrectly marked. Students were nevertheless able to use the wrongly awarded credits to gain NCEA. Each year NZQA takes a random sample of internal assessment for close checking. In some schools, nearly all the credits gained are from internal assessments. Additionally, lower decile schools tend to both use internal assessment more and have larger gaps between internal and external achievement rates when compared to higher decile schools. NZQA said there were more mistakes than usual as new standards had been introduced during the ongoing realignment and teachers had not yet adjusted their marking.

In September 2016, the Level One MCAT (Maths Common Assessment Test) was criticised for being set at a level that was "far too difficult", although Education Minister Hekia Parata commented that 'overall achievement in the assessment was "in line with expectations and higher than 2015"'.

In August 2026, Radio New Zealand reported that teachers from the Aotearoa Foundation Skills and Pathways Association were increasingly adopting the New Zealand Certificate of Foundation Skills, an alternative qualification provided by polytechnics and other tertiary institutions, as an alternative to NCEA due to the increasing number of school leavers without qualifications.

=== Alleged grade inflation ===
In July 2015, James Cote and Michael Johnston suggested that grade inflation was behind the increases in NCEA student pass rates. This suggestion was further expressed in an Newsroom article published in April 2017.

=== Platform failures ===
Between 30 October and 10 November 2023, the online platform used to administer NCEA exams had several failures. In May 2024, an independent review stated that NZQA was "too relaxed" about its relationship with the company providing the online platform. The review also found that these glitches were the result of a number of safeguards failures at the New Zealand Qualifications Authority including a defect in the log-in system on the NCEA website which triggered both NZQA's Keycloak security application and the vendor's assessment platform Assessment Master. The reviewer Debbie Francis made several recommendations for the NZQA to improve its online system. NZQA also apologised for the failure of its digital assessment platform.

In November 2026, the NCEA online platform experienced several disruptions. On 11 November, 120 students sitting their NCEA Level 3 English exam at St Andrew's College in Christchurch experienced technical problems on the exam portal. NCEA said that the affected students would receive derived grades. On 12 November, a major glitch disrupted the NCEA Level 2 English exam, with several students being unable to log in and others being forced to switch to paper exams or accept derived grades. On 13 November, NZQA chief Christian Hawkesby apologised to affected students and parents for the failure of the digital platform and said that paper copies would be made available for students sitting nextweek's NCEA Level 1 English exam. NZQA said the problem related to the transfer of student responses from the exam platform to the marking platform overnight. Acting Education Minister Erica Stanford said "that students had been badly let down" and demanded that NCEA provide an urgent plan of action to prevent a recurrence of the situation.

On 17 November 2026, a second major glitch disrupted the NCEA Level 1 English exam, forcing several students to opt for the paper version of the exam. Pip Tinning, the head of the New Zealand Association for the Teaching of English (NZATE), expressed disappointment with NZQA and said that several schools and teachers would look at going back to paper exams. The Post Primary Teachers' Association (PPTA) president Chris Abercrombie said that the glitch affected schools nationwide including Auckland, Invercargill and the West Coast Region. He also suggested that a lack of confidence in the NCEA's online exam portal could lead schools to return to paper and pen exams. In response, NZQA chief executive Hawkesby apologised for the online disruption, which he attributed to a system slowdown that lasted for about 20 minutes. He said that the system subsequently returned to "full operation" and that students were able to log back in and continue their exams online. Hawkesby said that the NZQA had also provided schools with paper copies and given affected students additional time to make up for lost time.

On 19 November, Hawkesby announced that affected NCEA Level 2 English students would be given the opportunity to resit a paper test on 4 December. About 45,000 students would be eligible to sit this test.

== See also ==
- Cambridge International Education
- International Baccalaureate
