= New Zealand Qualifications Authority =

Educational authority in New Zealand

- Mana Tohu Mātauranga o Aotearoa (Māori)

Agency overview
- Formed: 1989
- Jurisdiction: New Zealand government
- Headquarters: Level 13 125 The Terrace Wellington New Zealand
- Employees: 454.63 FTEs (as at 30 June 2026), compared to 460.18 FTEs in June 2025.
- Annual budget: As of 2022 NZD ~$80 million
- Minister responsible: Erica Stanford, Minister of Education
- Agency executives: Kevin Jenkins, Board Chairperson; Christian Hawkesby, Chief Executive
- Parent agency: Ministry of Education
- Website: www.nzqa.govt.nz

The New Zealand Qualifications Authority (NZQA; Māori: Mana Tohu Mātauranga o Aotearoa) is the New Zealand government Crown entity tasked with administering educational assessment and qualifications. It was established by the Education Act 1989.

NZQA administers the National Certificate of Educational Achievement (NCEA) and the New Zealand Scholarship for secondary school students. It is also responsible for the quality assurance of non-university, tertiary training providers, the New Zealand Register of Quality Assured Qualifications, and the New Zealand Qualifications Framework. It has further roles in evaluating overseas qualifications.

In July 1990 it took over the work of the former Universities Entrance Board, the Ministry of Education's examinations, the Trades Certification Board, and the Authority for Advanced Vocational Awards.

NZQA is funded from the central government and third party revenue, and as of 2022 had an annual budget of approximately $80 million.

== Governance ==
As of 2026, Christian Hawkesby was appointed as the Chief Executive, supported by Olivia Hall, Utufa'asisili Rosemary Mose, Emily Fabling, Jann Marshall and Tim Bowron,.

Former New Zealand politician Tracey Martin was a Chair of the NZQA Board.

== Māori strategy ==
NZQA's Māori strategy, Te Rautaki Māori 2012–2017, guides NZQA towards fulfilling its contribution to the government's education sector goal of Māori enjoying and achieving education success as Māori. The strategy was launched in June 2012 with the two main goals of Accelerated Māori learner success and advanced use of Mātauranga Māori.

NZQA has also produced two publications that support these goals – Enhancing Mātauranga Māori and Global Indigenous Knowledge (launched April 2014) and the earlier Conversations on Mātauranga Māori (launched July 2012).

== Review ==
A Targeted Review of Qualifications (TRoQ) at levels 1–6 on New Zealand's ten-level qualifications framework commenced in 2008. The review aimed to ensure that New Zealand qualifications are useful and relevant to current and future learners, employers, and other stakeholders. NZQA administers the New Zealand Qualifications Framework (NZQF) which was established in July 2010 as a result of the Targeted Review and is a comprehensive, up-to-date list of all non-university quality assured qualifications in New Zealand.

Tertiary organisations are required to comply with statutory policies like the periodic external evaluation and review (EER) policy, that provides an independent judgement of the educational performance and capability in self-assessment of all non-university tertiary education organisations. In 2011 NZQA introduced a new set of incentives and sanctions for providers, based on EER results, to bring higher performance to the sector.

In May 2014 NZQA introduced 'Innovation at NZQA' to its website, detailing the organisation's strategic thinking and 'Future State' programme of work around responding to a global and digital environment and trialling new processes and technologies.

== Numbers ==
In 2013 more than 143,000 candidates took part in the annual NCEA and New Zealand Scholarship examinations administered by NZQA, and achievement results were analysed in the Annual Report on NCEA and New Zealand Scholarship Data & Statistics released each year by NZQA.

In 2016 more than 146,000 candidates sat NCEA and Scholarship exams. Due to the Kaikoura earthquake, the Scholarship exams were postponed. Students in the Hurunui and Kaikoura districts were unable to attend their exams as their schools were closed, meaning they had to use their derived grades.

== Controversies ==
In 2005 the Authority's Chairman and CEO resigned after an investigation by the State Services Commission into the 2004 New Zealand Scholarship exams. In the physics exams only 39 out of 1,012 students who sat the exam received a scholarship while in English the result was 228 out of 587. This, and the state of the Authority as a whole at that time, was described by media as a "debacle".

== Concerns over exams ==
In 2016, mistakes were made in the 2016 maths exam at every level.

In 2017, many students and teachers were left perplexed by NCEA Level 1 MCAT (maths common assessment task) external exams, stating that they were "too difficult" and "not in the correct standard". NZQA stated that they had full confidence in their papers, but the minister has asked for a review.

== See also ==
- Education in New Zealand
