= Maria Gaiyabu =

Nauruan educator

- Education: University of Hawaiʻi at Mānoa, University of Cambridge
- Employer: University of the South Pacific - Nauru Campus

Maria Gaiyabu is a Nauruan educator, writer, and politician. She served as Nauru's Secretary of Education. She is the first educator from Nauru to earn a doctorate.

She earned a master's degree in elementary education in 1996 from the University of Hawaiʻi at Mānoa with the thesis Elementary Schooling Practices, Post-Colonial Politics and the Struggle of Identity in Nauru. She graduated with a PhD from the University of Cambridge in 2007 with the dissertation Ekereri in the lives of teachers, parents and pupils: A path to school effectiveness and improvement in Nauru.
