= Foreign relations of Senegal =

Senegal's first president, Léopold Senghor, advocated close relations with France and negotiation and compromise as the best means of resolving international differences after Senegal's independence from its status as a French colony. To a large extent, the two succeeding presidents, Abdou Diouf and Abdoulaye Wade, have carried on Senghor's policies and philosophies. Senegal has long supported functional integration among French-speaking West African states through the West African Economic and Monetary Union.

Senegal has a high profile in many international organizations and was a member of the UN Security Council in 1988–89. It was elected to the UN Commission on Human Rights in 1997. Friendly to the West, especially to France and to the United States, Senegal also is a vigorous proponent of more assistance from developed countries to the Third World. Additionally, Senegal has been a member state of the African Union since 1963.

Senegal borders The Gambia, Mauritania, Mali, Guinea, and Guinea-Bissau. Senegal enjoys mostly cordial relations with its neighbors. In spite of clear progress on other fronts with Mauritania (border security, resource management, economic integration, etc.), there remains the problem of an estimated 30,000 Black Mauritanian refugees living in Senegal.

Senegal is also a member of the International Criminal Court with a Bilateral Immunity Agreement of protection for the US-military (as covered under Article 98).

== Pre-colonial foreign policy ==
Senegal was regarded as Senegambia before the arrival of Europeans (Jaiteh), where a number of independent kingdoms settled. By the 15th century, when the first Europeans arrived, Senegambia was linked to intra and inter-regional (Decourse, 8) trade networks that extended throughout the coast. During the 17th and 18th centuries, the African slave trade took advantage of autonomous kingdoms such as, the Wolof and Jolof kingdoms (Tang, 3). The establishment of French colonies coupled with the competing hegemonic power between local ethnic groups within the Wolof kingdom led to a power void after traditional rulers could not prevent the French from impeding the establishments already in place by politicians and elites (Venema, 4) . The change from slave trade to the trade of cash crops set the precedent for the collapse of states within both empires (Gray, 3). The French used Senegal's advantageous geographic location, on the coast of the Atlantic Ocean, to safeguard their interest in the trade of groundnuts (Schraeder and Gaye, 488). The foreign policy of Senegal is also characterized by the religious values and beliefs of Islam. The spiritual traditions and foundations of Senegal represent another facet of foreign policy in and outside of the region. Political and diplomatic actors are ultimately determined by marabouts that intercede on behalf of the people to Allah (Schraeder and Gaye, 489). Some marabouts establish loyalist relationships of patron with political leaders. Marabouts do not make policy, but their support is essential to the stability of government (Behrman Creevey, 262).

== Independence (1960–1989) ==
Senegalese independence began in 1960 with Léopold Sedar Sénghor as the first president and was succeeded by Abdou Diouf in 1980. Senegalese diplomats in the Ministry of Foreign Affairs believe that West Africa must unite in order to not only remain competitive in an international economy dominated by superpowers like China and the United States, but also promote and consolidate economic development within West Africa. Senegalese policy officials prioritize and use the individual strengths of surrounding African countries in order to strengthen regional economies and weaken regional dependency on foreign actors. This combative approach for western influence is underscored in the Senegalese constitution in clause four of the preamble: "must spare no effort in the fulfillment of African Unity". These efforts have been actively pursued through formal diplomatic agreements with neighboring countries, such as the Mali Foundation in 1960, the Federation with Gambia from 1982 to 1989, as well as informal forms of cooperation such as the Inter-State Authority in the Fight Against Drought in the Sahel (CILSS), The Economic Community of West African States (ECOWAS), The Joint African and Malagasy Organization (OCAM), the Organization for the Development of the Gambia River Valley (OMVG), and the Organization for the Development of the Senegal River Valley (OMVS).

=== Cold War Foreign Policy ===
During the Cold War, Senegal was part of the non-aligned world and remained neutral throughout the conflict. In 1965, the first Foreign Minister of Senegal, Doudou Thiam, published a book titled "The Foreign Policy of African States." Thiam implored Africa to move beyond the ideological divisions of the Cold War to form a third neutral ideology on which African states could build their own path. This concept of non-alignment became a central theme in Senegalese politics. Senegal's first President Léopold Sedar Sénghor privileged the country's relationship with France and sided with French President Charles de Gaulle against "superpower" domination between the U.S. and the Soviet Union. France accounted for 95% of all investments in Senegal and 80% of Senegal's foreign trade in the 1960s. Due to the close economic relationship between France and Senegal, Senegal appealed to French protectionism over West Africa, declining to move too closely to any superpower. Nonetheless, Senegal's ties with Western countries like France tilted its alignment westward.

==== "La Francophonie" ====
One of the important strategic goals of Senegalese leaders was the integration and cooperation of Francophone Africa; a policy known as "la Francophonie" coined by President Senghor. The promotion of this concept played a key role in the formation of worldwide summits, such as the Franco-African Summit, that allowed Senegal to emerge as a leader within the francophone movement in Africa, African consolidation, unification and cooperation are at the center of Senegalese foreign policy. Senegal was also one of the founding members of several organizations designed to integrate Francophone Africa, including the African and Malagasy Common Organization in 1961 and the Malian Federation in 1960.

==== "Négritude" ====
Another cornerstone of Senegalese foreign policy during the Cold War was the exemplification of African Art and international cultural ties. This was connected to President Senghor's ideology of "Negritude" which emphasized Pan-Africanism and the exceptionalism of African culture. In 1966, the First World Festival of Negro Arts was hosted in Dakar, Senegal. The event was a tribute the art and excellence of the African Diaspora across the world. In the development of the event, Senegal strengthened relations with the UN, African states like Ethiopia, and nations on both sides of the Cold War. The United States was one of the key supporters of the event, sending the largest delegation of performers, artists, and technician of any of the 43 participating nations. Despite an official policy of non-alignment, Senegal used African Art and Culture as a negotiation tool with international partners and build a "soft" foreign policy with a variety of nations. At the same time, the First World Festival of Negro Arts was seen by many post-colonial states as neocolonial due to its connection to French concept of Negritude and cooperation with Western powers. The event strained relationships with Algeria and Guinea who would host their own festival in the years following in Algiers.

==== Iran-Senegal Relations ====
Senegal's non-alignment policy also contributed to the building of significant relationships with other nations. President Sénghor developed strong political and economic ties with the Shah of Iran, Mohammad Reza Pahlavi. In 1971, formal diplomatic relations were established, and, by 1973, the Shah was providing $2.4 million in developmental loans for Senegal (Steele 180–1). Iran continued to provide development investment and loans from 1974 to 1979 that focused on the trade of Iranian oil for Senegalese phosphate, including the creation of an oil refinery and a new adjacent city in Senegal (Steele 183–4). The project was never completed due to funding gaps and the Iranian Revolution, despite strong intentions to move forward.

== Current Partnerships ==
=== U.S.-Senegal Relations ===
Diplomatic relations between the United States and Senegal began in 1960, following independence and the dissolution of the Mali Federation. Early after independence, a relationship was formed between President Senghor and U.S. President John F. Kennedy as part of the latter's "African Policy." As part of Senegal's policy of non-alignment and African Socialism, bilateral relations between the two were limited but meaningful. The United States contributed aid to Senegal, including for the First World Festival of Negro Arts, and maintained consistent contact with the country throughout the Cold War via its US Agency for International Development (USAID).

Today, U.S.-Senegal Relations are defined by foreign aid, military cooperation, and the protection of democracy in the region. The United States provides a growing amount of economic aid to the country. Senegal has received aid for democracy promotion, food security, and development projects like $1.5 million in aid for solar energy and nano-loan financing systems. Health diplomacy is another sector of aid that the United States and Senegal collaborate on. These include programs for child health, the prevention of Malaria, and family planning funded by USAID. Recently, the US sent $10.7 million of emergency aid and 99,450 vaccine doses to Senegal to combat the COVID-19 pandemic. Defense has also been a major area of partnership as Senegal has remained a stable nation in a region consistently fraught with violence. In 2016, both nations also signed a Defense Cooperation Agreement that would ensure joint-military training and missions in West African states affected by Islamic extremism and alleviate the need for more troops to be stationed in Senegal. Senegal has also supported U.S. military missions in Iraq (1991), Niger (2016), and even its own territory during the Ebola outbreak of 2014, through the auspices of the United States African Command (AFRICOM). Another major priority of the United States in Senegal is the promotion and protection of democracy. Senegal's democratic system has persisted for decades and has become more democratic following the Cold War, garnering the attention of the U.S. as a model state for West Africa. The United States manages several programs or aid packets meant to increase democratic diplomacy. One of these programs is conducted by the United States Information Agency which help hold workshops and training with Senegalese news federation and reporters to increase the independence and power of the press in the country.

The relationship between the United States and Senegal is often limited by the country's strong ties with France, preventing deep connections from forming without diplomatic conflict. The French have been critical of recent "hard" diplomacy actions by the U.S., including AFRICOM and limited the nation's African Crisis Response Initiative (ACRI) to the training of African forces in West Africa.

== Intergovernmental Organizations ==
=== ECOWAS ===
Senegal is a Zone A member of ECOWAS since its formation in 1975 with the signing of the Treaty of Lagos and the largest contributor of troops in the Economic Community of West African States Monitoring Group (ECOMOG). According to the ECOWAS official website, Senegal's affairs in ECOWAS are currently overseen by Madame Aissata Tall Sall, Senegal's Foreign Minister. Senegal holds 6 seats in ECOWAS's Community Parliament, which assigns seats based on member states' populations.

The Trans-West African Coastal Highway was an ECOWAS project which made significant infrastructure developments that connected Senegals' Capital, Dakar, to other major cities in the surrounding region, such as Lagos in Nigeria and Nouakchott in Mauritania. Additionally, ECOWAS oversaw the construction of a 1.9 km bridge connecting Senegal to its interior neighbor, the Gambia, and has begun plans to construct a bridge connecting Mauritania and Senegal. Not only did these projects expand Senegal's physical infrastructure and access to its neighbors, but they are projected by officials to be prosperous for economic development through trade expansion.

On July 10, 2014, ECOWAS member states agreed to begin an economic partnership agreement (EPA) with the EU. The implementation of the EPA, along with the adoption of a common external tariff (CET) for ECOWAS members, impacted the Senegalese economy's ability to levy custom tariffs on EU imports, thus reducing revenue collected by the Senegalese government, but increasing remuneration in the formal Senegalese labor market.

==== Guinea-Bissau Civil War (1998) ====
Senegal contributed about 2,000 troops upon the request of President Joao Bernardo Vieira of Guinea-Bissau for support during the Guinea-Bissau Civil War. The contribution of Senegalese troops to the Civil War also served to benefit Senegalese national interests because Vieira's government was at risk of being replaced in a coup attempt by Ansumane Mane. Mane was believed to be sending weapons to Casamance separatists, who are a secessionist group in the southwestern region of Senegal. In November 1998, Senegal abided by the conclusion of the ECOWAS authority to withdraw Senegalese and Guinean troops from the intervention and instead allow the other ECOWAS nations to contribute armed forces in Guinea-Bissau.

==== The Gambia (2017) ====
ECOWAS militarily intervened in The Gambia in 2017 when Former Gambian President Yahya Jammeh refused to concede after losing the election that year, abbreviated as ECOMIG and code-named "Operation Restore Democracy". The Senegalese Foreign Minister first brought this concern to the U.N. Security Council in an emergency meeting (UNSC Resolution 2337). The resolution called for a peaceful resolution to the Gambian presidential crisis and passed unanimously; ECOWAS military forces, led by a Senegalese commander, entered the Gambia following the resolution's passage. Senegal's armed forces played an active role in this military intervention and had a vested political interest in Jammeh stepping down; Adama Barrow, the current Gambian president, was sworn into his presidential office in the Gambian embassy in Dakar, Senegal for fear of his safety. Additionally, Jammeh was a cause of concern because his alleged aid to Casamance separatists in Senegal. Conflicts between pro-Jammeh forces and the Senegalese armed forces produced refugee flows into Senegal and Guinea-Bissau.

=== Mali Federation (1959–60) ===
Senegal was an active member of the Mali Federation during its existence from 1959 to 1960. Along with French Sudan, Senegal advocated for the union of French-speaking West African nations, including the proposal of the union's name, and was a key contributor in its creation. The formation of the Federation reflected a desire to prevent AOF (Afrique Occidentale Française, or French West Africa) from fragmenting — the constitution writing process was led by Leopold Senghor and Modibo Keita, the first presidents of Senegal and Mali, respectively.

In 1960, Senegalese and Malian interests conflicted when Senghor became a candidate for the presidency of the Federation and Keita responded by declaring a state of emergency. On August 20, Senegal left the Mali Federation. The Federation subsequently dissolved.

=== Senegambian Confederation (1981-89) ===
The Senegambian Confederation, comprising The Gambia and Senegal, was established in 1981 and dissolved in 1989. The Confederation was intended to promote security, political, and economic unity between the two countries, and in the vision of the Senegalese government, an eventual integration of the countries, to which The Gambia resisted. The Confederation's disestablishment was initiated by the abrupt withdrawal of Senegalese troops from the Gambia, but ultimately was a culmination of multiple factors.

=== CILSS ===
The Comité permanent Inter-États de Lutte contre La Sécheresse dans Le Sahel (CILSS) or the Permanent Interstates Committee for Drought Control in the Sahel is an international organization dedicated to combatting the effects of drought and desertification in the Sahel region of Africa. Founded in 1973 after major droughts across the Sahel, CILSS has worked to uphold the work of ECOWAS in ensuring food and energy security, to educate local engineers on more sustainable development practices, to provide information on ongoing environmental problems, and to research the effects of climate change and desertification. While originally consisting of 13 mostly Francophone West African nations including Senegal, the organization was integrated into ECOWAS, expanding to a total of 17 members.

Senegal is one of the founding members of CILSS and one of its biggest contributors The nation and Senegalese President Macky Sall has been leaders in development projects like "2iS" or the "Sahel Irrigation Initiative" which would create a network of irrigation infrastructure across the Sahel belt to support water-insecure areas.

=== African and Malagasy Common Organization (1961–1985) ===
The African and Malagasy Common Organization or the Organization Commune Africaine et Malgache (OCAM) was an international organization that encompassed much of Francophone West and Central Africa and Madagascar from 1961 to 1985. It was originally established as the Union Africaine et Malgache in 1961, with the support of France, for the purpose of greater economic, political, and social integration of French-speaking West Africa. At its height from 1961 to 1973, the organization included 14-15 members and changed names several times before finally settling on the African, Malagasy, and Mauritian Common Organization (OCAMM). After 1973, member states began to leave the organization because of the lack of substantive work and integration of its governing bodies, especially following the establishment of the Organization of African Unity (later the African Union) in 1963 which had a broader Pan-African focus and mandate.

Senegal was a member of OCAM from its founding to its eventual dissolution in 1985 and was instrumental in its development. President Senghor, in particular, was a major supporter of the organization because of his policy of " la Francophonie" or the integration of French-speaking Africa. Senegal remains a member of several of the institutions that were initially created by the Conference of Heads of State while OCAM was still functional, including the African and Malagasy Council on Higher Education (CAMES).

=== OMVG ===
Senegal is one of the two founding members of the Organization pour la Mise en Valeur de la Fleuve Gambie (OMVG), also known as the Organization for the Development of the Gambia River Basin. Its other members include Gambia, Guinea-Bissau, and Guinea. The objective of the organization is to ensure the proper management and shared usage of water resources in the Gambia and Geba River Basins across the borders of member states. The OMVG has become increasingly important in recent years due to climate change and conflicts between Senegal and Guinea-Bissau over water resources in the Geba river. One of its main projects is the usage of the river basin for hydro-electrification. Particularly in Southern Senegalese region of Kédougou, the planned construction of Sambangalou Hydroelectric Development (AHES) on the border of Guinea would provide power and greater agriculture potential to the area.

=== OMVS ===
The Organization pour la Mise en Valeur de la Fleuve Sénégal (OMVS) or the Organization for the Development of the Senegal River Basin was established in 1972 and consists of four member states: Senegal, Guinea, Mali, and Mauritania. Former Senegalese President Senghor is considered one of the "founding fathers" of the organization. The goals of the OMVS are to promote the economic integration, development, and sustainability of the river basin which provides essential natural resources to member states. Dakar, the capital of Senegal, relies on the Senegal river for 75% of its water usage.

The OMVS has been an effective organization at developing the Senegal River Basin, but have experienced diplomatic and environmental problems throughout its existence. The most serious of these conflicts was between Senegal and Mauritania. In the late-1980s and early-1990s, there were a series of violent clashes between Senegalese farmers and Mauritanian herders over scarce resources near the river. After the murder and expulsion of Senegalese farmers from Mauritania, troops from both countries were mobilized to the border and over 100 Mauritanians were killed in Dakar while the rest were expelled. The only remaining Mauritanians in Senegal were diplomats working for the OMVS which remained the only diplomatic relationship between Senegal and Mauritania at the time. This period almost saw the two countries go to war and cemented current tensions within the organization despite continuing plans for development and research.

== Future developments in foreign policy ==
Senegal is regarded on the international stage as one of the most stable democracies in Africa (Konte) as a result of three peaceful power-transitions since 1960 (WorldBank). Senegalese policy making is primarily based on immediate neighbors, the remainder of Africa, the Arab world and other Muslim states, and western democracies (Schraeder and Gaye, 501) and revolves around Mauritania, Mali, Guinea, Guinea-Bissau, and Gambia (Schraeder and Gaye, 502). A source of conflict between Senegal and surrounding nations has been the management and development of shared border resources (Schraeder and Gaye, 503).

Senegalese foreign policy also revolves around Senegal's involvement in the internal affairs of other African nations and the desire to take and establish a lead role in a myriad of organizations committed to promoting regional integration and African unity (Schraeder and Gaye, 504). International commitments are a distinctive aspect of Senegalese foreign policy and includes arrangements with international organizations that operate in Senegal and members of state organizations that Senegal belongs to (Sall, 9). An obligatory resolution mandated by the United Nations or a decree by the Economic Community of West African States (ECOWAS) may constitute an international commitment by Senegal.

Senegalese foreign policy is now characterized by a nationalism that is fueled by the place Senegal once had within the French colony and a traditional culture. Thus, constituting a sense of regional superiority in regards to the domain of regional integration. The thirty-five years of uninterrupted democratic rule in Senegal has also been a key factor in Senegalese foreign policy. Over seventy percent of people are dependent on agriculture to provide economic stability and most of Senegal's economic earnings stem from the exportation of groundnuts (Gray, 1). Thus, Senegal is currently working towards a structural transformation of their economy by implementing a form of economic diplomacy to strengthen regional stability and seize foreign markets (Zacchia et al., 2). Senegal plays an active role within international organizations such as the United Nations Security Council, Economic Community of West African States (ECOWAS), Nepad, and the Organisation of Islamic Cooperation or the International Organisation of La Francophonie (WorldBank).

In December 2024, Senegalese President Bassirou Diomaye Faye indicated the end of all military presence of foreign countries in Senegal, from 2025.

== Diplomatic relations ==
List of countries which Senegal maintains diplomatic relations with:

#	Country	Date
1	Egypt	4 April 1960
2	France	20 August 1960
3	United Kingdom	20 August 1960
4	Germany	23 September 1960
5	United States	24 September 1960
6	Japan	4 October 1960
7	Israel	10 November 1960
8	Morocco	15 November 1960
9	Norway	2 December 1960
10	Cameroon	1960
11	Nigeria	1960
12	Pakistan	1960
13	Sri Lanka	1960
14	Saudi Arabia	22 January 1961
15	Belgium	1 February 1961
16	Italy	1 March 1961
17	India	2 April 1961
18	Switzerland	11 April 1961
19	Ghana	21 April 1961
20	Lebanon	22 April 1961
21	Brazil	26 April 1961
22	Sweden	8 May 1961
23	Denmark	16 May 1961
24	Serbia	31 May 1961
25	Guinea	9 June 1961
—	Holy See	17 November 1961
26	Netherlands	7 November 1961
27	Austria	1961
28	Haiti	4 February 1962
29	Argentina	28 March 1962
30	Mauritania	4 May 1962
31	Mexico	9 May 1962
32	Canada	1 June 1962
33	Russia	14 June 1962
34	Poland	18 June 1962
35	South Korea	19 October 1962
36	Sierra Leone	26 October 1962
37	Liberia	1962
38	Tunisia	1962
39	Chile	4 June 1963
40	Mali	22 June 1963
41	Democratic Republic of the Congo	June 1963
42	Turkey	17 October 1963
43	Algeria	9 April 1964
44	Trinidad and Tobago	21 November 1964
45	Ethiopia	1964
46	Sudan	1964
47	Syria	21 January 1965
48	Spain	3 March 1965
49	Gambia	13 May 1965
50	Romania	5 November 1965
—	Sovereign Military Order of Malta	1965
51	Bulgaria	28 December 1967
52	Czech Republic	28 December 1967
53	Hungary	24 January 1968
54	Gabon	17 May 1968
55	Luxembourg	13 June 1968
56	Finland	31 January 1969
57	Burundi	January 1969
58	Cambodia	27 March 1969
59	Republic of the Congo	9 April 1969
60	Zambia	25 April 1969
61	Jordan	12 July 1969
62	Kuwait	16 August 1969
63	Tanzania	22 August 1969
64	Vietnam	29 December 1969
65	Kenya	13 March 1970
66	Uganda	8 April 1970
67	Venezuela	10 September 1970
68	Rwanda	9 February 1971
69	Iran	13 May 1971
70	China	7 December 1971
71	Burkina Faso	27 December 1971
72	Greece	January 1972
73	Libya	2 February 1972
74	North Korea	8 September 1972
75	Central African Republic	September 1972
76	Chad	October 1972
77	Afghanistan	20 February 1973
78	Niger	2 March 1973
79	Albania	26 April 1973
80	Qatar	5 June 1973
81	Bangladesh	13 July 1973
82	United Arab Emirates	23 July 1973
83	Australia	10 February 1974
84	Cuba	9 August 1974
85	Guinea-Bissau	10 August 1974
86	Portugal	2 September 1974
87	Iraq	30 March 1975
88	Fiji	14 May 1975
89	Cape Verde	6 July 1975
90	Somalia	2 October 1975
91	Oman	25 December 1975
92	Jamaica	8 January 1976
93	Philippines	15 March 1976
94	Barbados	18 March 1976
95	Togo	18 June 1976
96	Comoros	10 July 1976
97	Malta	3 November 1976
98	Yemen	1976
99	Malaysia	1 April 1977
100	Ivory Coast	18 March 1978
101	Djibouti	24 March 1978
102	São Tomé and Príncipe	April 1978
103	Uruguay	8 May 1978
104	Costa Rica	23 January 1979
105	Thailand	9 August 1980
106	Ecuador	25 August 1980
107	Indonesia	3 October 1980
108	Maldives	15 February 1981
109	Zimbabwe	1 June 1981
110	Colombia	1 August 1981
111	Bahrain	13 December 1981
112	Angola	16 February 1982
113	Mongolia	12 December 1985
114	Bolivia	16 January 1987
115	Panama	27 October 1987
116	Seychelles	8 July 1988
—	State of Palestine	6 January 1989
117	Namibia	18 April 1990
118	Brunei	25 November 1991
119	Estonia	3 April 1992
120	Lithuania	4 May 1992
121	Latvia	9 June 1992
122	Ukraine	25 November 1992
123	Slovakia	1 January 1993
124	Bosnia and Herzegovina	20 August 1993
125	South Africa	6 May 1994
126	Uzbekistan	6 October 1995
127	Azerbaijan	14 March 1996
128	Slovenia	19 May 1997
129	Croatia	1 October 1997
130	Suriname	17 April 1998
131	Singapore	16 June 1999
132	Belarus	25 January 2002
133	Madagascar	12 August 2002
134	North Macedonia	20 October 2002
135	Iceland	7 April 2004
136	Armenia	8 April 2004
137	San Marino	17 October 2006
138	Andorra	20 December 2006
139	Kazakhstan	13 March 2008
140	Saint Vincent and the Grenadines	23 September 2008
141	Dominica	28 January 2009
142	Monaco	23 June 2009
143	Guyana	10 November 2009
144	Paraguay	March 2010
145	Kyrgyzstan	2 April 2010
146	Georgia	19 August 2010
147	Montenegro	22 September 2010
148	Honduras	14 February 2011
149	New Zealand	17 April 2012
150	Tuvalu	1 July 2013
—	Kosovo	14 February 2014
151	Ireland	15 April 2014
152	Mozambique	29 May 2014
153	Mauritius	3 July 2014
154	Turkmenistan	25 September 2014
155	Eritrea	10 October 2014
156	Equatorial Guinea	19 February 2015
157	Botswana	16 March 2015
158	El Salvador	29 September 2015
159	Guatemala	29 September 2015
160	Malawi	9 March 2016
161	Saint Kitts and Nevis	27 April 2016
162	Peru	5 December 2017
163	Tajikistan	24 August 2018
164	Dominican Republic	24 September 2018
165	Moldova	28 April 2021
166	Liechtenstein	2021
167	South Sudan	19 July 2022
168	Bahamas	26 September 2025
169	Nepal	26 September 2026
170	Benin	Unknown
171	Cyprus	Unknown
172	Nicaragua	Unknown

== Bilateral relations ==
=== Africa ===
Country	Formal Relations Began	Notes
Madagascar	12 August 2002	Both countries established diplomatic relations on 12 August 2002: Madagascar has an embassy in Dakar.; Senegal is accredited to Madagascar from its embassy in Pretoria, South Africa.
Mauritania	4 May 1962	See Mauritania–Senegal relations Both countries established diplomatic relations on 4 May 1962 when Permanent Representative of Mauritania to Senegal Mamadou Lamine Ba, presented his credentials to President Leopold Sedar Senghor. In the years following independence, Mauritania's principal ally in sub-Saharan Africa was Senegal, although the two countries have espoused different strategies for development. The growing split between blacks and Maures in Mauritania has, however, affected ties with Senegal, which sees itself as championing the rights of Mauritania's black minority. Under the presidency of Mu'awiya al-Taya, relations between the two countries were correct, even though each accused the other of harboring exiled dissidents. In May 1987, Senegal extradited Captain Moulaye Asham Ould Ashen, a former black member of the Haidalla government accused of corruption, but only after veiled threats from Nouakchott that failure to do so would result in Mauritania's allowing Senegalese dissidents a platform from which to speak out against the government of President Abdou Diouf. At the same time, Senegal and Mauritania have cooperated successfully with Mali under the Senegal River Development Office (Organisation pour la Mise en Valeur du Fleuve Sénégal—OMVS), which was formed in 1972 as a flood control, irrigation, and agricultural development project.
Namibia	27 April 1990	Both countries established diplomatic relations on 27 April 1990: Namibia has a resident embassy in Dakar.; Senegal is accredited to Namibia from its embassy in Pretoria, South Africa.

=== Americas ===
Country	Formal Relations Began	Notes
Canada	26 May 1962	See Canada–Senegal relations Both countries established diplomatic relations on 26 May 1962.: Canada has an embassy in Dakar.; Senegal has an embassy in Ottawa.
Guatemala	29 September 2015	Both countries established diplomatic relations on 29 September 2015: Guatemala is accredited to Senegal, through its embassy in London, United Kingdom.; Senegal is accredited to Mexico from its embassy in Washington, D.C., United States.
Mexico	10 May 1962	Both countries established diplomatic relations on 10 May 1962 See Mexico–Senegal relations: Mexico is accredited to Senegal from its embassy in Rabat, Morocco. and maintains an honorary consulate in Dakar.; Senegal is accredited to Mexico from its embassy in Washington, D.C., United States and maintains an honorary consulate in Mexico City.
United States	24 September 1960	Both countries established diplomatic relations on 24 September 1960 See Senegal–United States relations Senegal enjoys an excellent relationship with the United States. The Government of Senegal is known and respected for its able diplomats and has often supported the U.S. in the United Nations, including with troop contributions for peacekeeping activities. The United States maintains friendly relations with Senegal and provides considerable economic and technical assistance.: Senegal has an embassy in Washington, DC and a consulate-general in New York City.; United States has an embassy in Dakar.

=== Asia ===
Country	Formal Relations Began	Notes
China	7 December 1971	See China–Senegal relations The People's Republic of China established diplomatic relations with the Republic of Senegal on December 7, 1971. The Senegalese Government and the Republic of China (Taiwan) signed a communique on "resuming diplomatic relations" on January 3, 1996. Therefore, the Chinese Government announced the suspension of diplomatic relations with Senegal on January 9, 1996. China and Senegal resumed diplomatic ties at the ambassadorial level as of Oct. 25, 2005.
India	2 April 1961	Both countries established diplomatic relations on 2 April 1961 See India-Senegal relations: India has an embassy in Dakar; Senegal has an embassy in New Delhi.
Indonesia	3 October 1980	Both countries established diplomatic relations on 3 October 1980
Iran	13 May 1971	See Iran–Senegal relations Both countries established diplomatic relations on 13 May 1971. Iranian president Mahmoud Ahmadinejad and his Senegalese counterpart Abdoulaye Wade had a joint press conference along with a close meeting in Feb 2008 in the city of Mashhad, both side pledged to expand the bilateral ties in the fields of economy, tourism and politics in addition to increase the efforts for empowering the OIC. Also the giant Iran-based automaker Iran Khodro established an assembly line to produce Iranian cars in Senegal and dispatch them to the African markets directly from Dakar. This Iranian-Senegalese company has the capacity to produce 10,000 Samand cars annually. In 2011, Senegal cut ties with Iran, accusing Tehran of supplying separatist rebels in the Casamance region with weapons. They purport that these weapons were used in the killing of three Senegalese soldiers.
Israel	10 November 1960	Both countries established diplomatic relations on 10 November 1960.; Both countries restored diplomatic relations on June 4, 2017 after they were broken on October 28, 1973 following the Yom Kippur War.; Israel has an embassy in Dakar.; Israel has persuaded Senegal to open an embassy in Jerusalem.
Japan	1960	Japan has an embassy in Dakar.; Senegal has an embassy in Tokyo.
Malaysia	1 April 1977	Both countries established diplomatic relations on 1 April 1977 See Malaysia–Senegal relations: Malaysia has an embassy in Dakar.; Senegal has an embassy in Kuala Lumpur.
Philippines	15 March 1976	Both countries established diplomatic relations on 15 March 1976: Philippines is accredited to Senegal from its embassy in Rabat, Morocco.; Senegal is accredited to the Philippines from its embassy in Kuala Lumpur, Malaysia.
South Korea	19 October 1962	The establishment of Diplomatic Relations between the Senegal and South Korea was on October 19, 1962; South Korea has an embassy in Dakar.
Thailand	9 August 1980	Both countries established diplomatic relations on 9 August 1980: Thailand has an embassy in Dakar which is also accredited to Ivory Coast.; Senegal is accredited to Thailand through its embassy in Kuala Lumpur, Malaysia.
Turkey	17 October 1963	See Senegal–Turkey relations Both countries established diplomatic relations on 17 October 1963 when accredited first Envoy of Turkey to Senegal with residence in Dakar Mr. Abdülahad Birden.: Senegal has an embassy in Ankara.; Turkey has an embassy in Dakar.; Trade volume between the two countries was US$292 million in 2019.; There are direct flights from Istanbul to Dakar.; Yunus Emre Institute has a local headquarters in Dakar.
United Arab Emirates	23 July 1973	Both countries established diplomatic relations on 23 July 1973 The United Arab Emirates established an embassy in Dakar in March 2018, which was unveiled by Abdullah Bin Zayed Al Nahyan. The Abu Dhabi Fund for Development loaned Senegal $13 million to invest in rural solar energy.: Senegal has an embassy in Abu Dhabi.; The United Arab Emirates has an embassy in Dakar.
Vietnam	29 December 1969	Both countries established diplomatic relations on 29 December 1969: Senegal is accredited to Vietnam through the embassy in Kuala Lumpur.; Vietnam formerly had an embassy in Dakar from 1973 to 1980; currently its embassy in Algiers is accredited to Senegal.

=== Europe ===
Country	Formal Relations Began	Notes
Austria		Austria has an embassy in Dakar.; Senegal is accredited to Austria, through its embassy in Berlin, Germany. Senegal also maintains an honorary consulate in Vienna.
France	20 August 1960	See France–Senegal relations Both countries established diplomatic relations on 20 August 1960: France has an embassy in Dakar and a consulate-general in Saint-Louis.; Senegal has an embassy in Paris and consulates-general in Bordeaux, Lyon and Marseille and a consular agency in Le Havre.
Germany	23 September 1960	See Germany–Senegal relations Both countries established diplomatic relations on 23 September 1960: Germany has an embassy in Dakar.; Senegal has an embassy in Berlin.
Kosovo	14 February 2014	Both countries established diplomatic relations on 14 February 2014: Senegal was the first African country which recognizes Kosovo's independence in 2008.; In 2017, Kosovo opened an embassy in Dakar, both country enjoy excellent friendships.
Poland	18 June 1962	See Poland–Senegal relations Both countries established diplomatic relations on 18 June 1962: Poland has an embassy in Dakar.; Senegal has an embassy in Warsaw.
Romania	5 November 1965	Both countries established diplomatic relations on 5 November 1965: Romania has an embassy in Dakar.; Senegal is accredited to Romania, through its embassy in Berlin, Germany. Senegal also maintains an honorary consulate in Bucharest.
Russia	14 June 1962	See Russia–Senegal relations The Soviet Union established diplomatic relations with Senegal on 14 June 1962: Russia has an embassy in Dakar.; Senegal has an embassy in Moscow.
Slovakia	1 January 1993	Both countries established diplomatic relations on 1 January 1993: Slovakia is accredited to Senegal through its embassy in Abuja, Nigeria.; Senegal is accredited to Slovakia, through its embassy in Berlin, Germany. Senegal also maintains an honorary consulate in Bratislava.
Spain	3 March 1965	Both countries established diplomatic relations on 3 March 1965 See Senegal–Spain relations: Senegal has an embassy in Madrid.; Spain has an embassy in Dakar.
United Kingdom	20 June 1960	See Senegal–United Kingdom relations Senegalese Foreign Minister Madické Niang with British Foreign Secretary William Hague in London, November 2010. Senegal established diplomatic relations with the United Kingdom on 20 June 1960.: Senegal maintains an embassy in London.; The United Kingdom is accredited to Senegal through its embassy in Dakar.; Both countries share common membership of the Atlantic Co-operation Pact, the International Criminal Court, and the World Trade Organization. Bilaterally the two countries have a Defence Cooperation Agreement, a Double Tax Convention, an Investment Agreement, and a Technical Cooperation Agreement.

== See also ==
- List of diplomatic missions in Senegal
- List of diplomatic missions of Senegal
- Senegambia Confederation
