= List of diplomatic missions of Senegal =

This is a list of diplomatic missions of Senegal, excluding honorary consulates. Senegal is a French-speaking country located in West Africa.

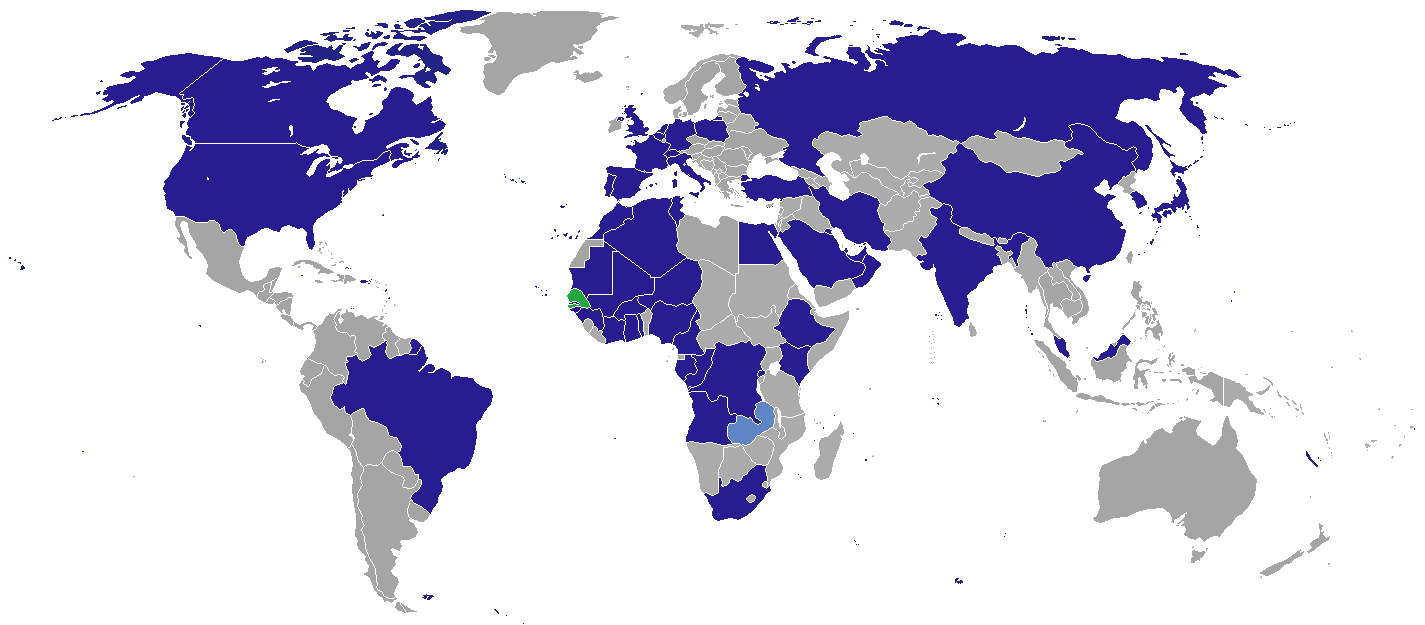
Map of Senegalese diplomatic missions

== Current missions ==
=== Africa ===
Host country	Host city	Mission	Concurrent accreditation	Ref.
Algeria	Algiers	Embassy		
Angola	Luanda	Embassy		
Burkina Faso	Ouagadougou	Embassy		
Cameroon	Yaoundé	Embassy	Countries: Central African Republic; Chad	
Cape Verde	Praia	Embassy		
Congo-Brazzaville	Brazzaville	Embassy		
Congo-Brazzaville	Pointe-Noire	Consulate-General		
Congo-Kinshasa	Kinshasa	Embassy	Countries: Malawi; Zambia	
Egypt	Cairo	Embassy	Countries: Israel; Palestine; Sudan	
Ethiopia	Addis Ababa	Embassy	Countries: Djibouti; Eritrea; International Organizations: African Union	
Gabon	Libreville	Embassy	Countries: Equatorial Guinea	
Gambia	Banjul	Embassy		
Ghana	Accra	Embassy		
Guinea	Conakry	Embassy		
Guinea-Bissau	Bissau	Embassy		
Ivory Coast	Abidjan	Embassy		
Kenya	Nairobi	Embassy	Countries: Uganda; International Organizations: United Nations; United Nations Environment Programme; United Nations Human Settlements Programme	
Mali	Bamako	Embassy		
Mauritania	Nouakchott	Embassy		
Morocco	Rabat	Embassy		
Morocco	Casablanca	Consulate-General		
Morocco	Dakhla	Consulate-General		
Niger	Niamey	Embassy		
Nigeria	Abuja	Embassy		
Rwanda	Kigali	Embassy	Countries: Burundi; Comoros; Seychelles; Tanzania	
South Africa	Pretoria	Embassy	Countries: Botswana; Eswatini; Madagascar; Mauritius; Mozambique; Namibia; Zimbabwe	
Togo	Lomé	Embassy		
Tunisia	Tunis	Embassy	Countries: Libya	
Zambia	Lusaka	Consulate-General		

=== Americas ===
Host country	Host city	Mission	Concurrent accreditation	Ref.
Brazil	Brasília	Embassy	Countries: Chile; Paraguay; Peru; Uruguay; Venezuela	
Canada	Ottawa	Embassy	Countries: Cuba; Dominican Republic	
United States	Washington, D.C.	Embassy	Countries: Bahamas; Barbados; Costa Rica; El Salvador; Grenada; Guyana; Guatemala; Honduras; Mexico; Nicaragua; Panama; Suriname; Trinidad and Tobago	
United States	New York City	Consulate-General	Countries: Bahamas; Barbados; Costa Rica; El Salvador; Grenada; Guyana; Guatemala; Honduras; Mexico; Nicaragua; Panama; Suriname; Trinidad and Tobago	

=== Asia ===
Host country	Host city	Mission	Concurrent accreditation	Ref.
China	Beijing	Embassy	Countries: Cambodia; Mongolia; North Korea	
China	Guangzhou	Consulate-General	Countries: Cambodia; Mongolia; North Korea	
India	New Delhi	Embassy	Countries: Maldives; Sri Lanka	
Iran	Tehran	Embassy	Countries: Pakistan	
Japan	Tokyo	Embassy	Countries: Australia; New Zealand; Papua New Guinea; Tonga	
Kuwait	Kuwait City	Embassy		
Malaysia	Kuala Lumpur	Embassy	Countries: Brunei; Indonesia; Laos; Myanmar; Philippines; Thailand; Vietnam; International Organizations: Association of Southeast Asian Nations	
Oman	Muscat	Embassy		
Qatar	Doha	Embassy		
Saudi Arabia	Riyadh	Embassy	International Organizations: Organisation of Islamic Cooperation	
Saudi Arabia	Jeddah	Consulate-General	International Organizations: Organisation of Islamic Cooperation	
South Korea	Seoul	Embassy	Countries: Singapore	
Turkey	Ankara	Embassy	Countries: Azerbaijan	
United Arab Emirates	Abu Dhabi	Embassy		

=== Europe ===
Host country	Host city	Mission	Concurrent accreditation	Ref.
Belgium	Brussels	Embassy	Countries: Luxembourg; International Organizations: European Union	
France	Paris	Embassy	Countries: Andorra; Monaco	
France	Bordeaux	Consulate-General	Countries: Andorra; Monaco	
France	Lyon	Consulate-General	Countries: Andorra; Monaco	
France	Marseille	Consulate-General	Countries: Andorra; Monaco	
France	Le Havre	Consular agency	Countries: Andorra; Monaco	
Germany	Berlin	Embassy	Countries: Austria; Hungary	
Holy See	Rome	Embassy (Note: The Senegalese Embassy to the Holy See is located outside Vatican territory in Rome.)	Sovereign Entity: Sovereign Military Order of Malta	
Italy	Rome	Embassy	Countries: Albania; Bosnia and Herzegovina; Bulgaria; Cyprus; Greece; Malta; North Macedonia; Serbia; Slovenia; International Organizations: Food and Agriculture Organization; International Fund for Agricultural Development; World Food Programme	
Italy	Milan	Consulate-General	Countries: Albania; Bosnia and Herzegovina; Bulgaria; Cyprus; Greece; Malta; North Macedonia; Serbia; Slovenia; International Organizations: Food and Agriculture Organization; International Fund for Agricultural Development; World Food Programme	
Italy	Naples	Consulate-General	Countries: Albania; Bosnia and Herzegovina; Bulgaria; Cyprus; Greece; Malta; North Macedonia; Serbia; Slovenia; International Organizations: Food and Agriculture Organization; International Fund for Agricultural Development; World Food Programme	
Netherlands	The Hague	Embassy	Countries: Denmark; Finland; Norway; Sweden; International Organizations: Organisation for the Prohibition of Chemical Weapons	
Poland	Warsaw	Embassy	Countries: Czechia; Latvia; Lithuania; Romania; Slovakia; Ukraine	
Portugal	Lisbon	Embassy		
Russia	Moscow	Embassy	Countries: Armenia; Belarus; Kazakhstan; Kyrgyzstan; Moldova; Tajikistan; Uzbekistan	
Spain	Madrid	Embassy	International Organizations: UN Tourism	
Spain	Barcelona	Consulate-General	International Organizations: UN Tourism	
United Kingdom	London	Embassy	Countries: Iceland; Ireland	

=== Multilateral organizations ===
Organization	Host city	Host country	Mission	Concurrent accreditation	Ref.
United Nations	New York City	United States	Permanent Mission		
United Nations	Geneva	Switzerland	Permanent Mission	Countries: Switzerland	
UNESCO	Paris	France	Delegation		

== Gallery ==
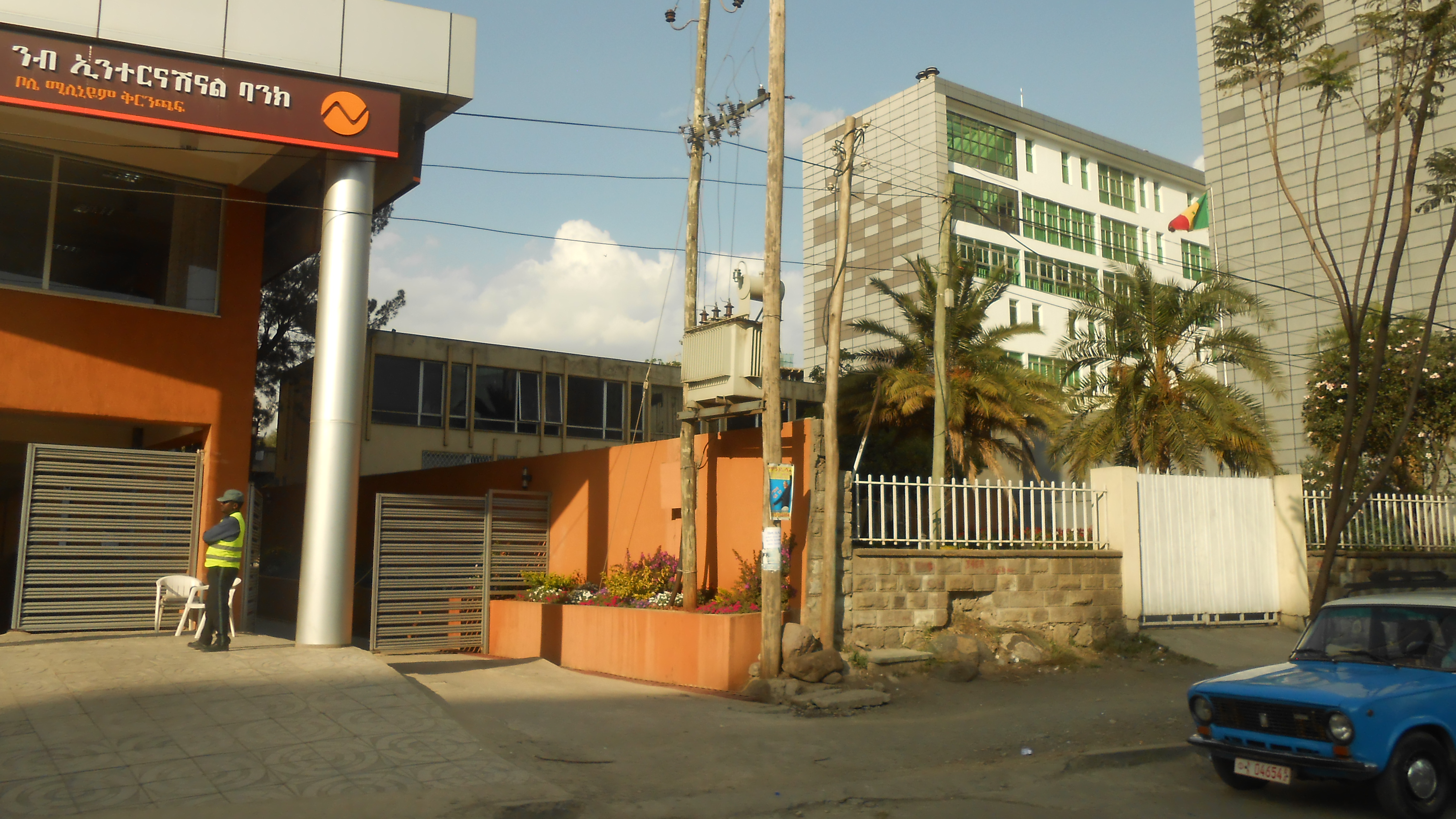
Embassy in Addis Ababa

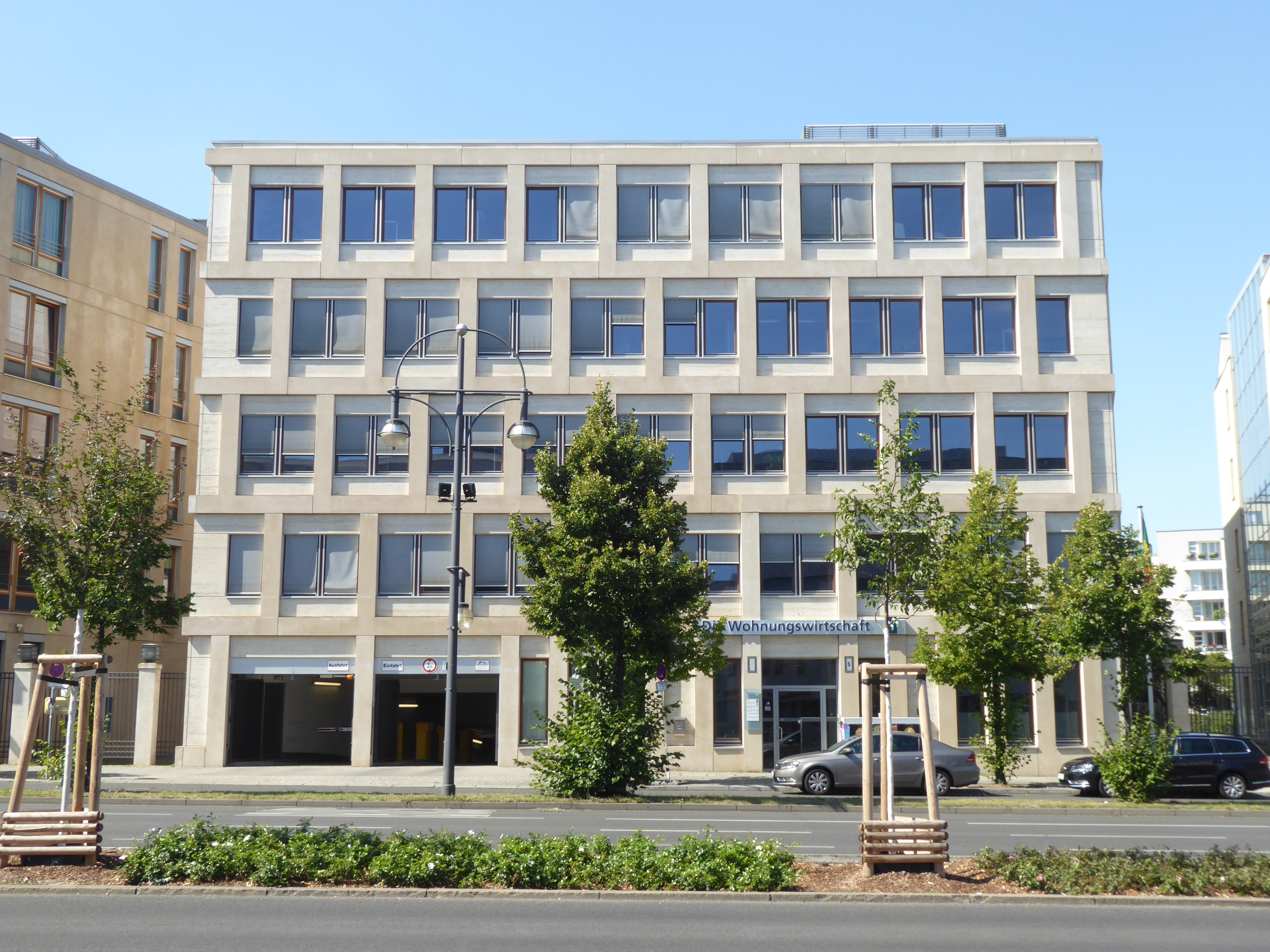
Embassy in Berlin

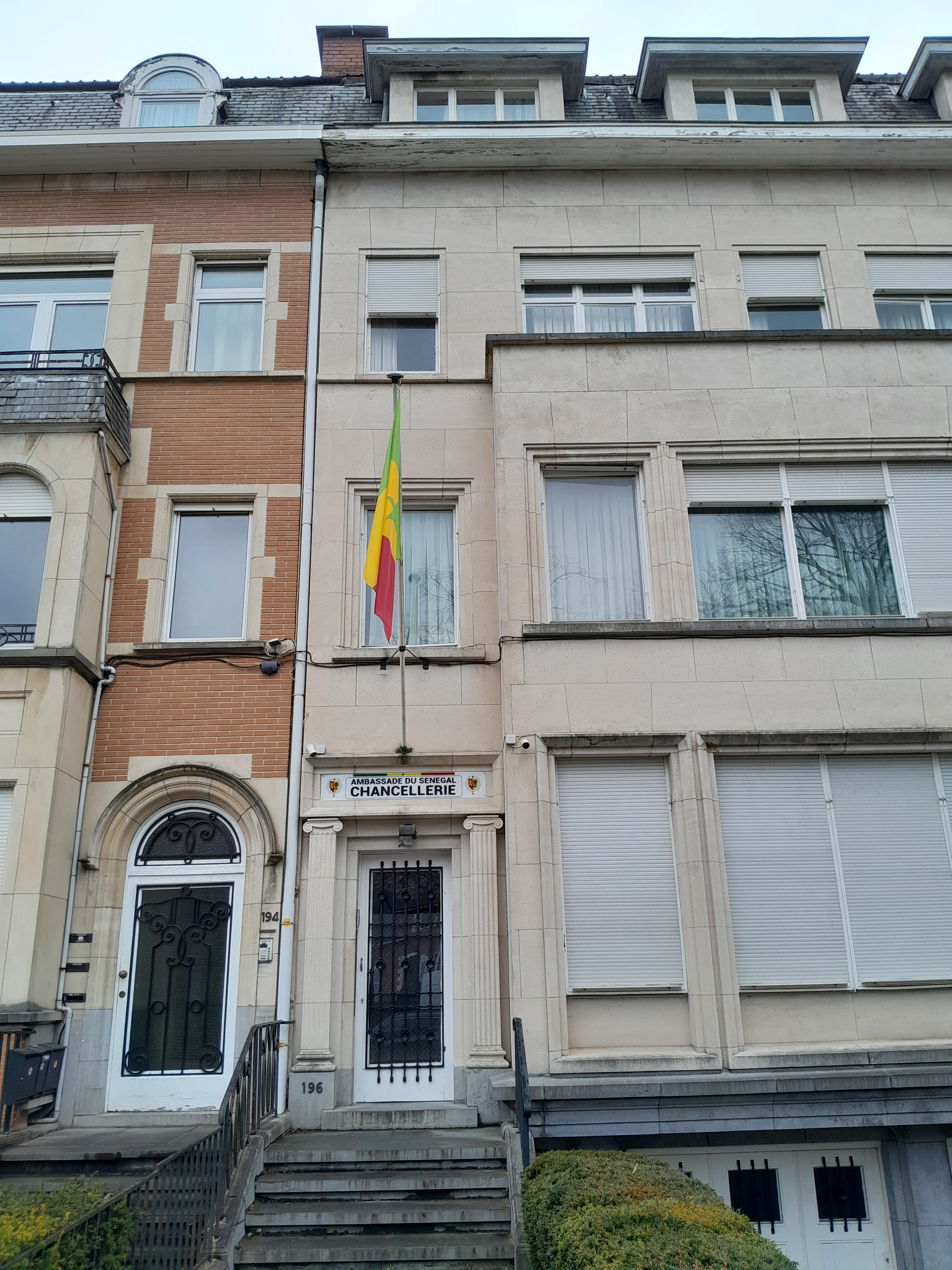
Embassy in Brussels

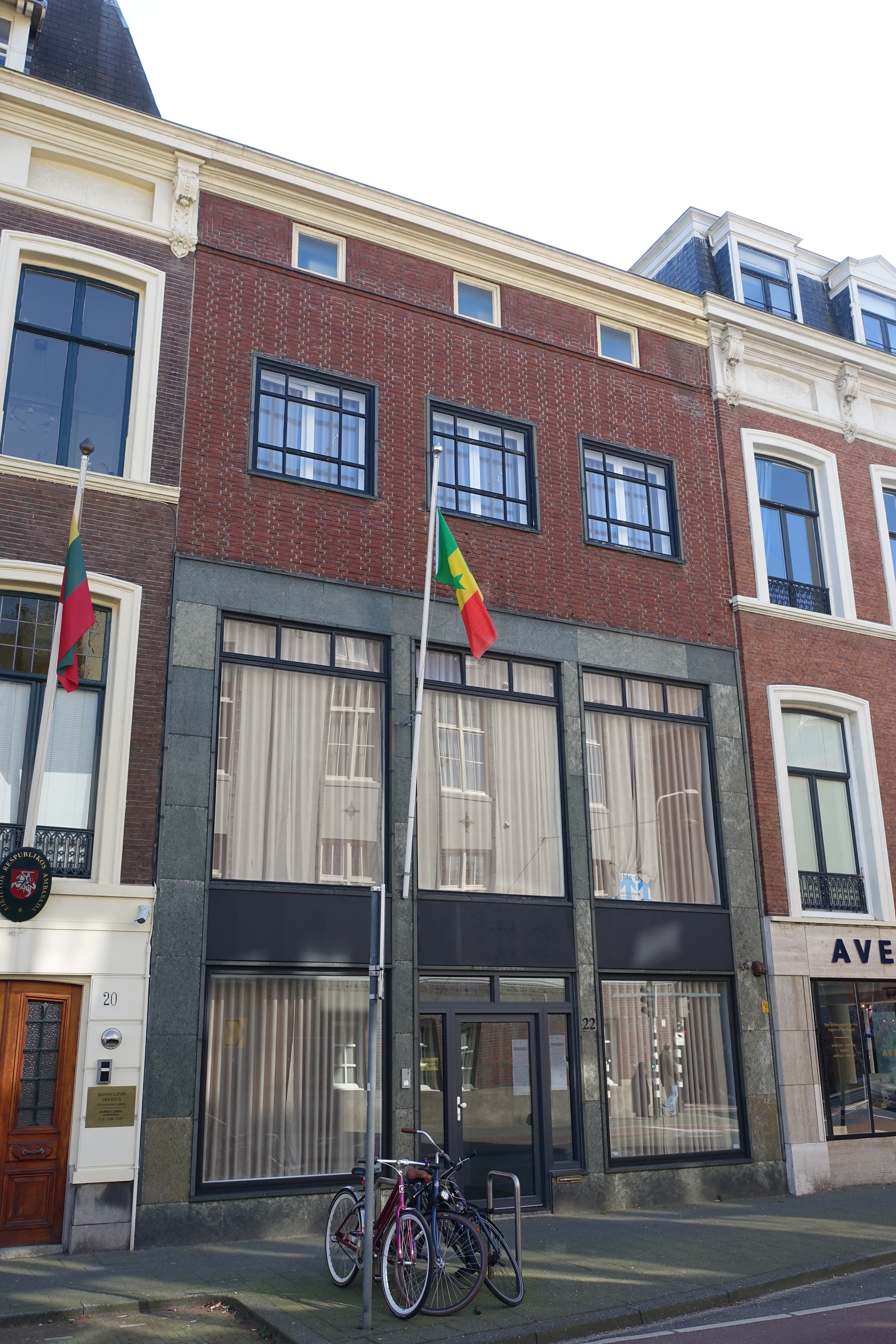
Embassy in The Hague

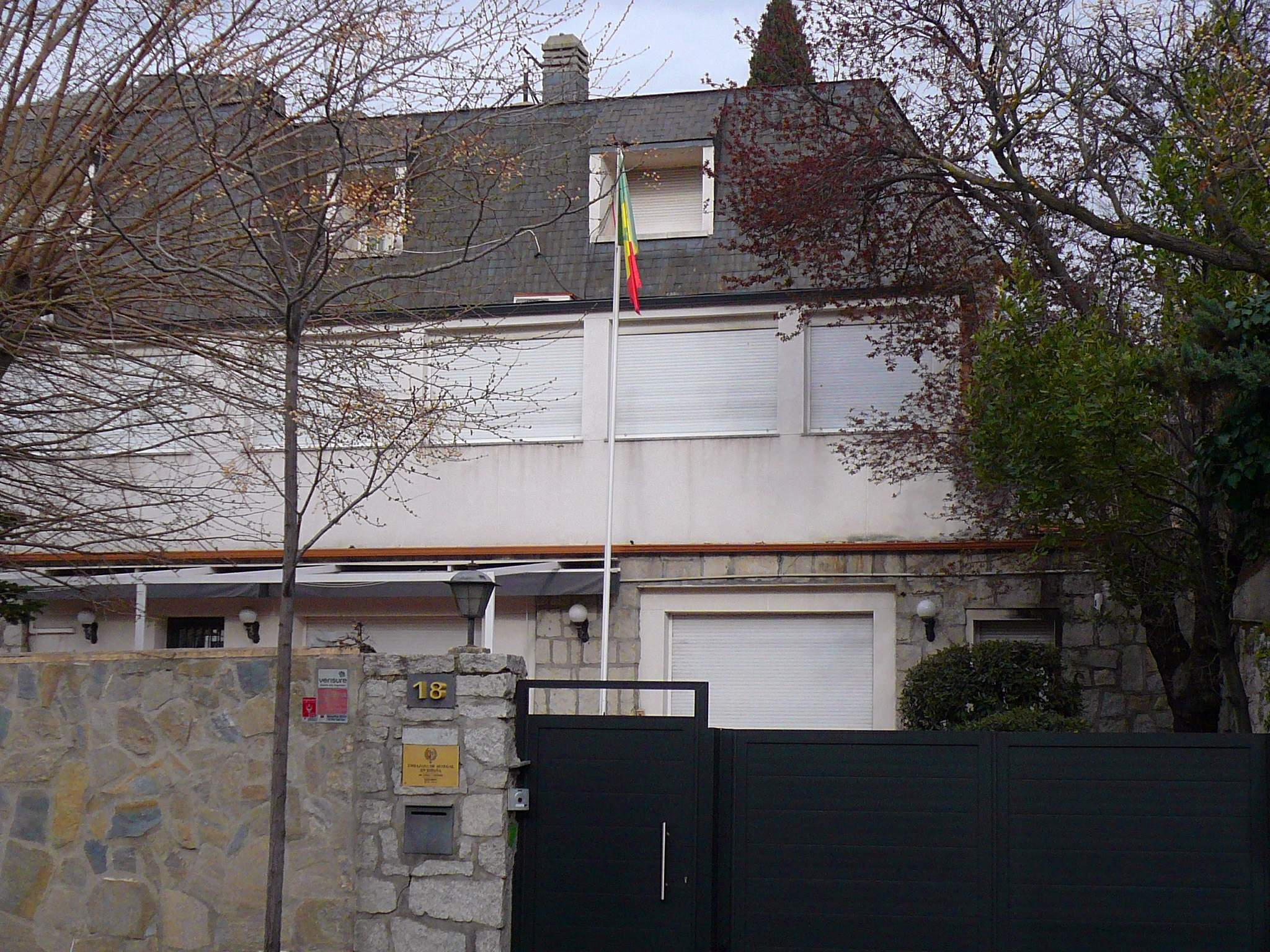
Embassy in Madrid

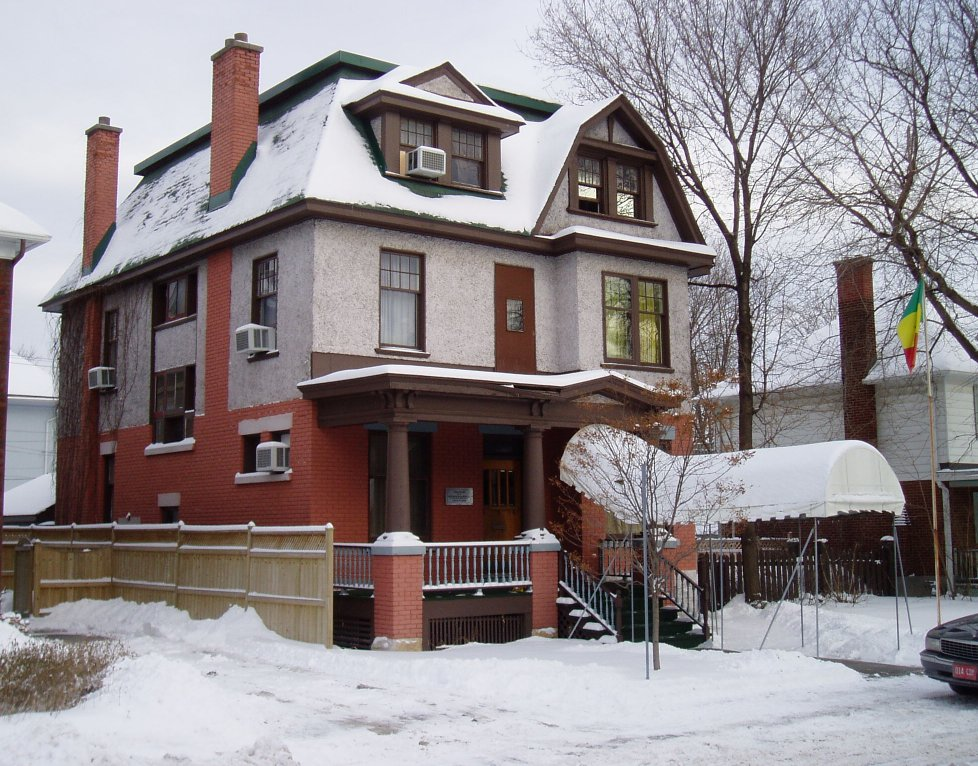
Embassy in Ottawa

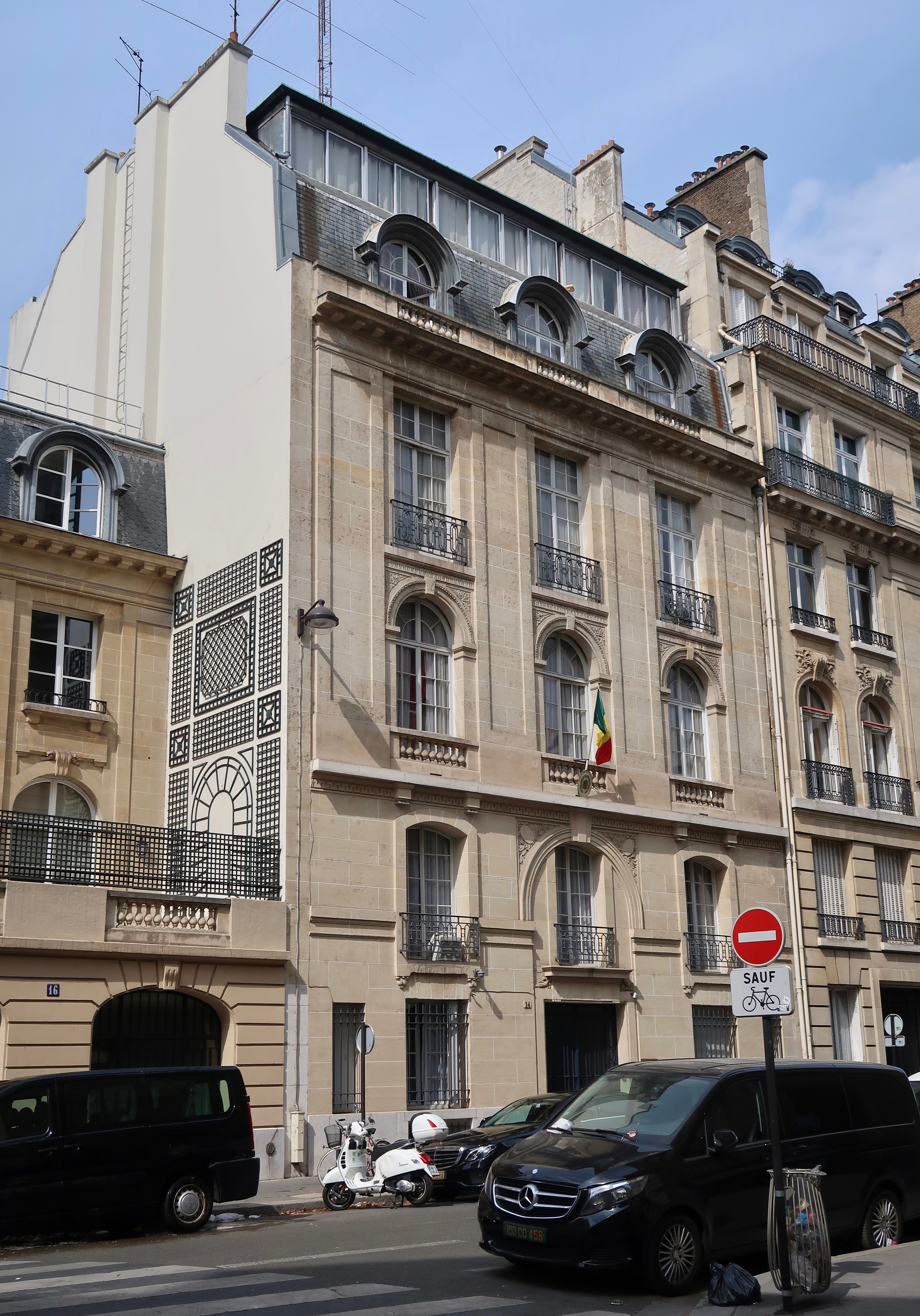
Embassy in Paris

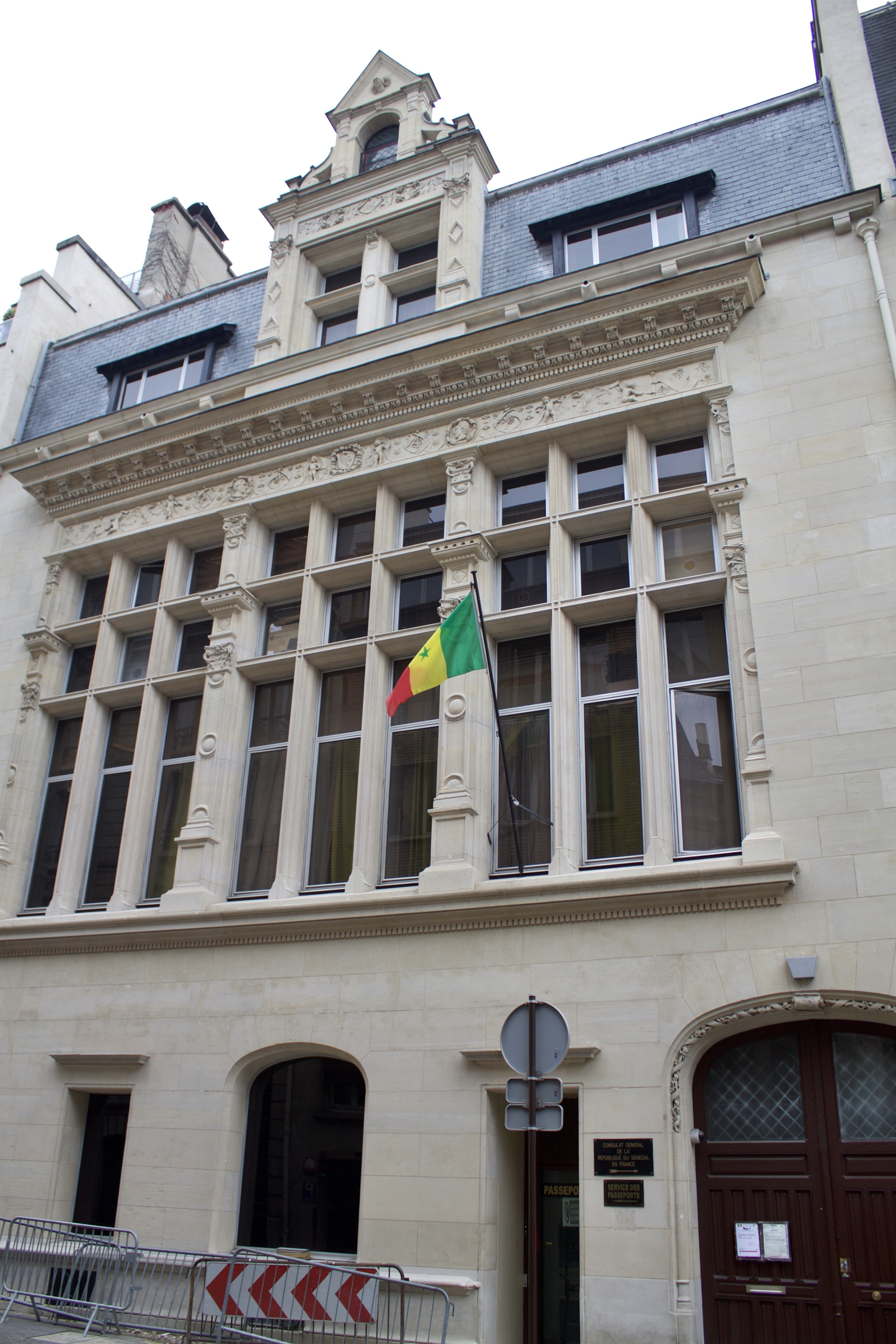
Consulate-General in Paris

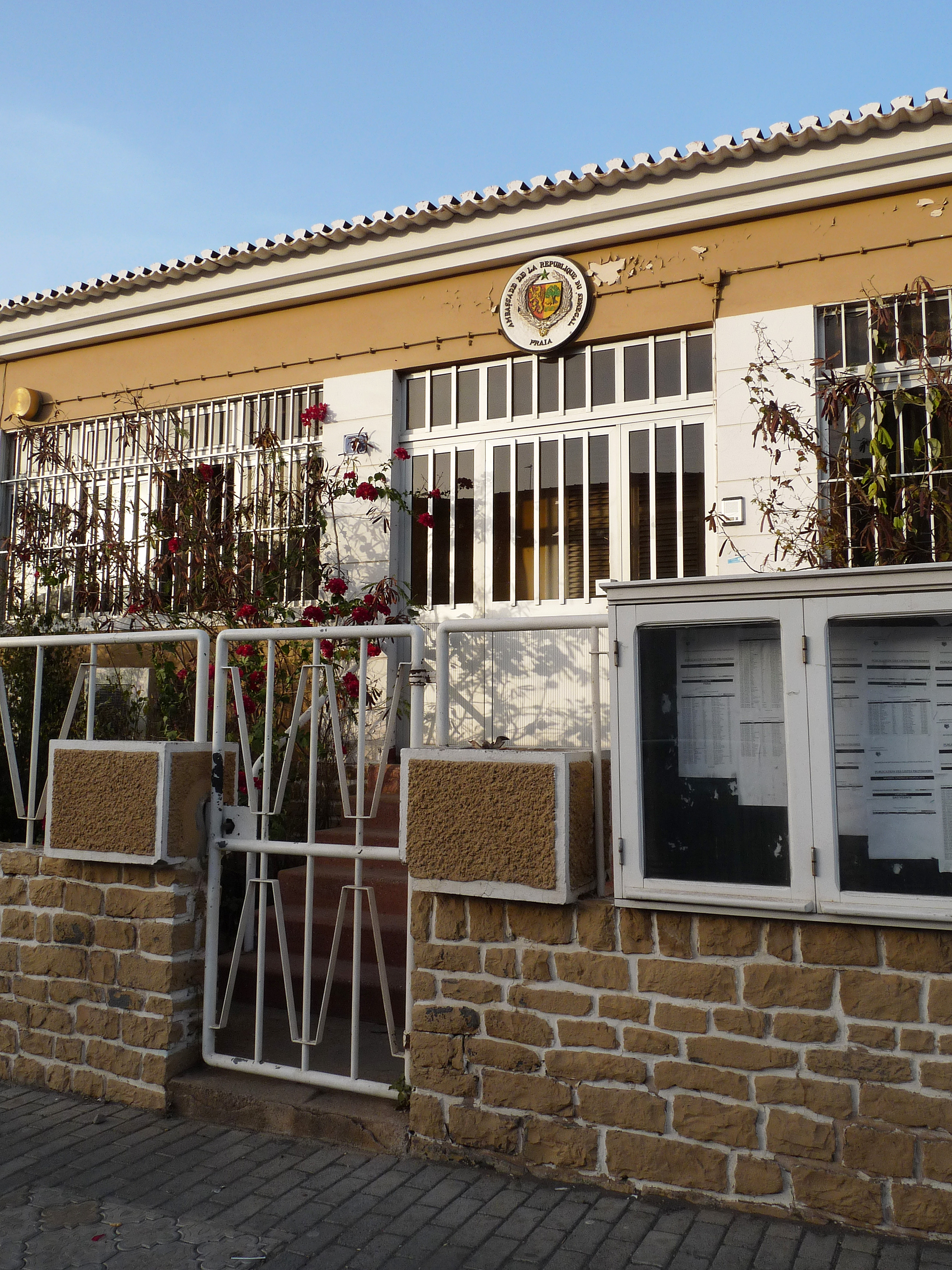
Embassy in Praia

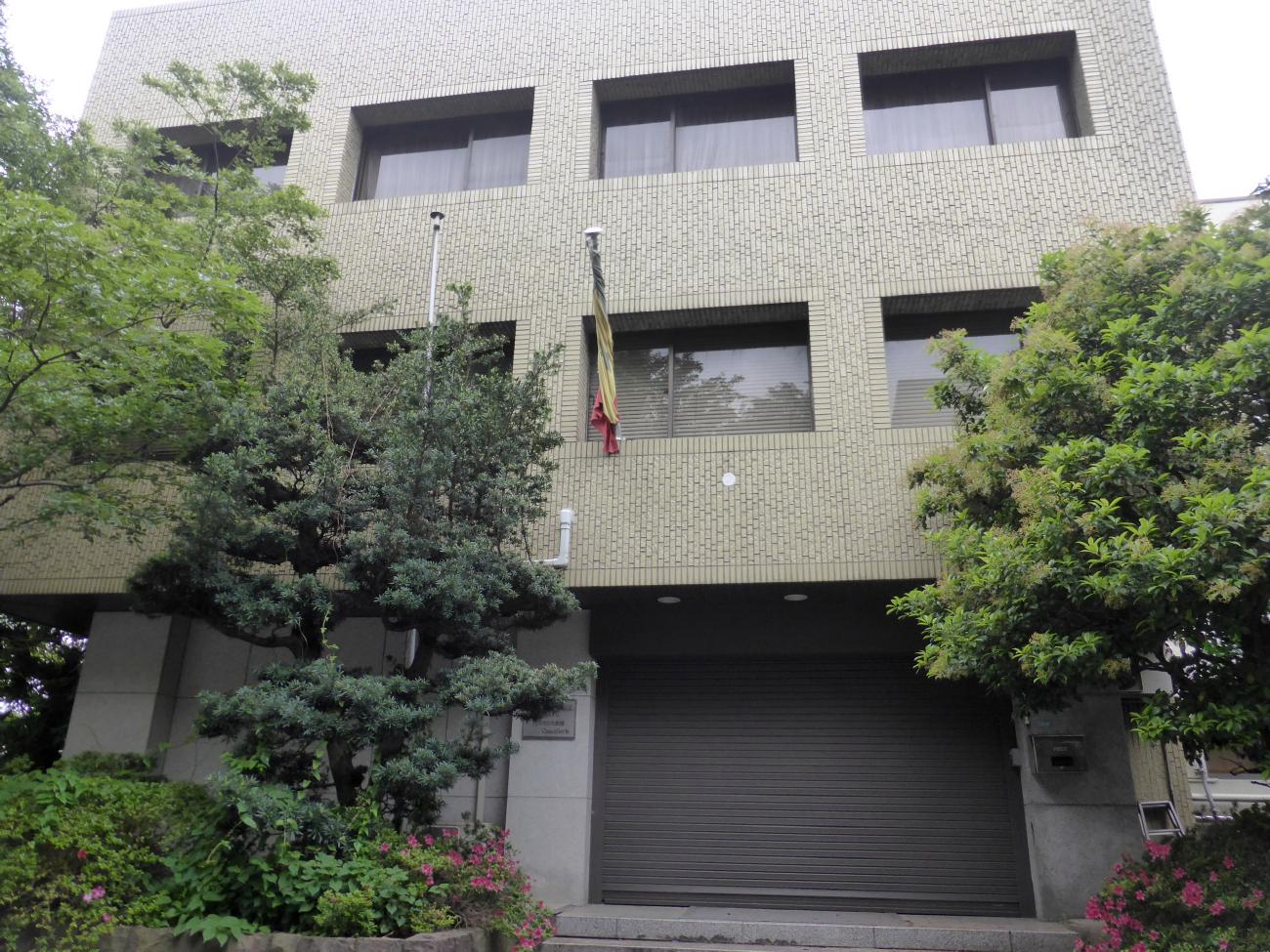
Embassy in Tokyo

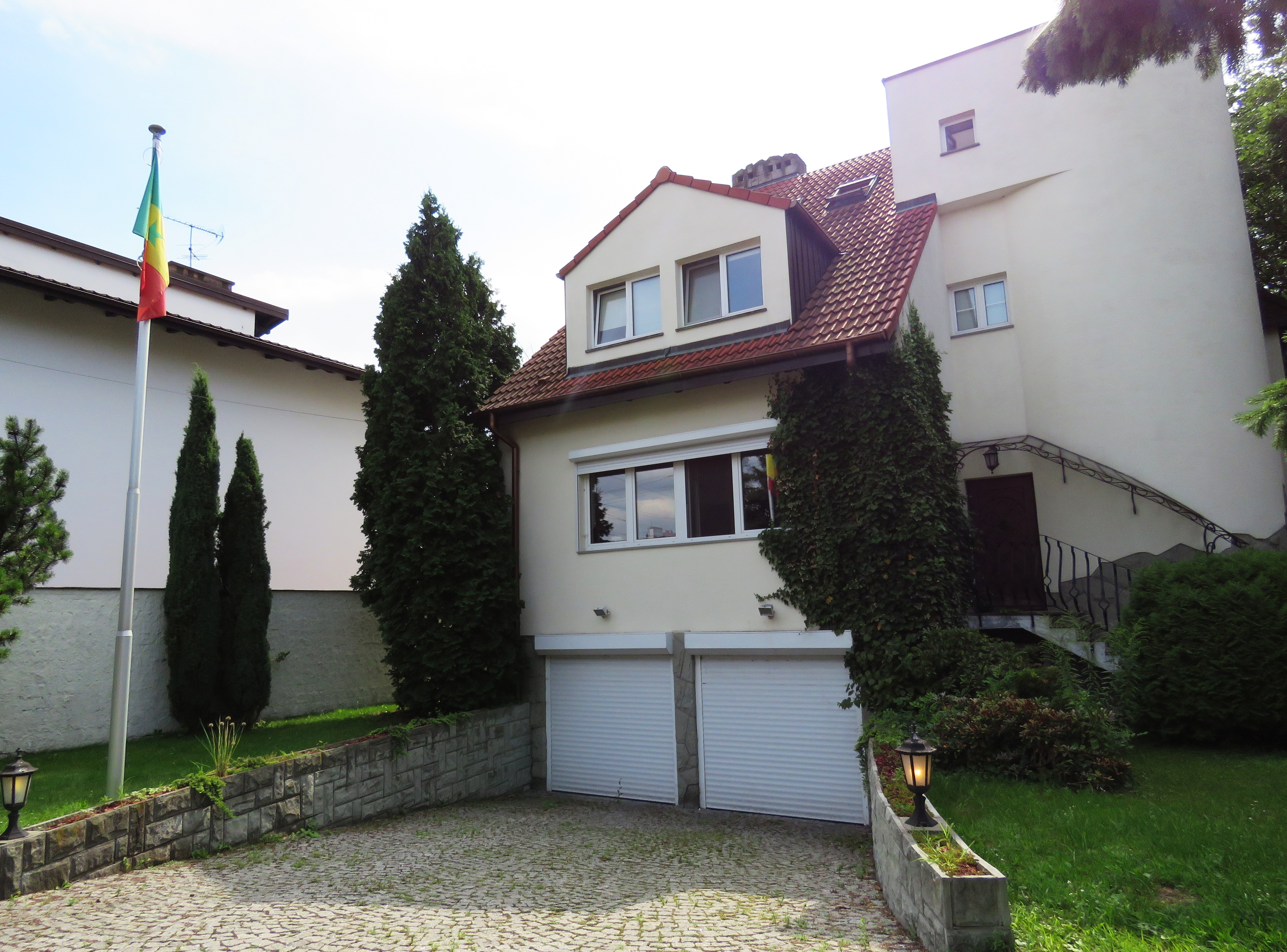
Embassy in Warsaw

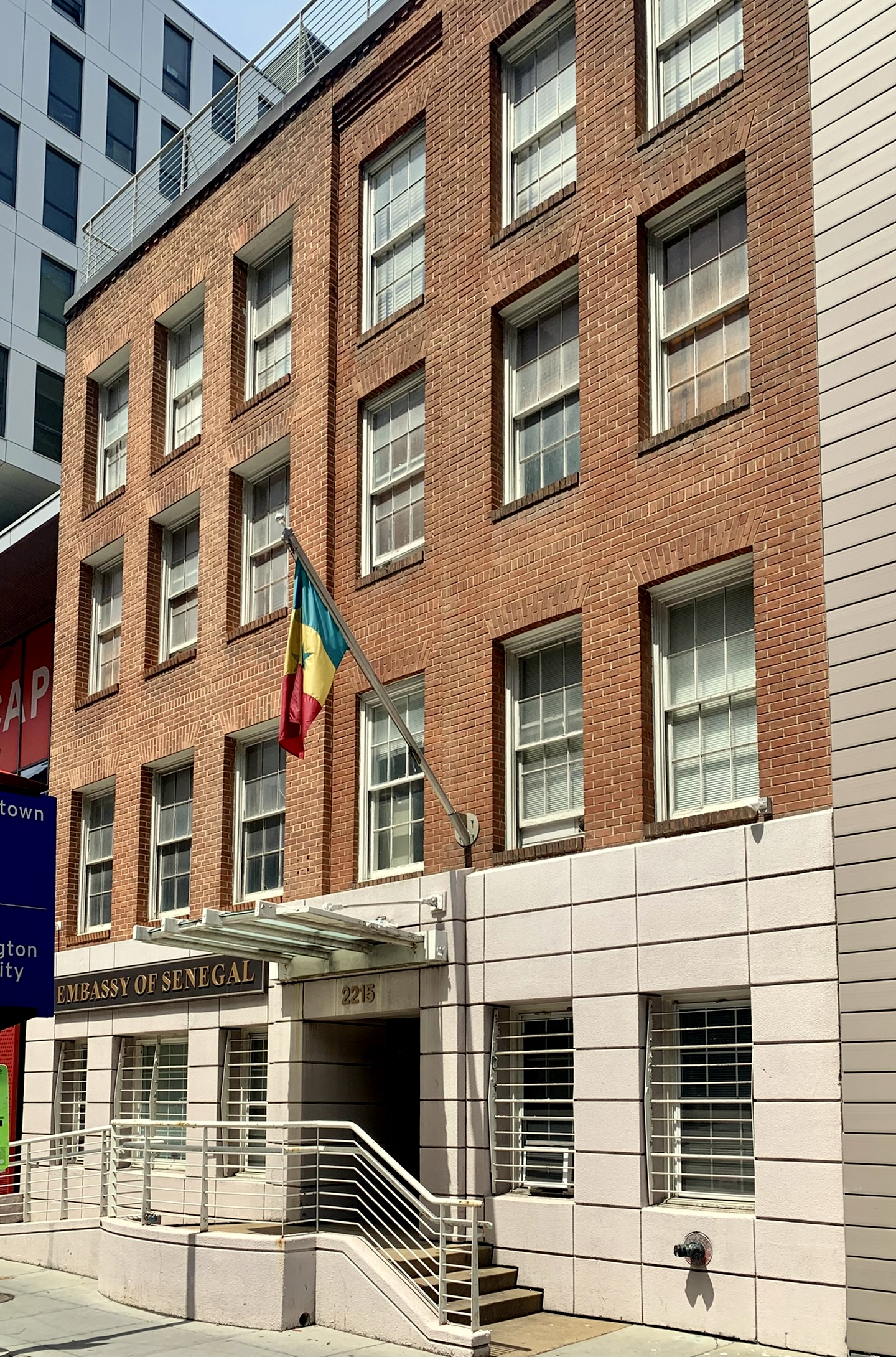
Embassy in Washington, D.C.

== Closed missions ==
=== Africa ===
Host country	Host city	Mission	Year closed	Ref.
Libya	Tripoli	Embassy (Note: To be reopened) (Note: Resident in Tunis, Tunisia)	Unknown	
Madagascar	Antananarivo	Embassy (Note: Resident in Pretoria, Gauteng, South Africa)	2012	

=== Asia ===
Host country	Host city	Mission	Year closed	Ref.
Indonesia	Jakarta	Embassy (Note: Resident in Kuala Lumpur, Malaysia)	Unknown	
Lebanon	Beirut	Embassy	Unknown	

=== Europe ===
Host country	Host city	Mission	Year closed	Ref.
Sweden	Stockholm	Embassy (Note: Resident in The Hague, Zuid-Holland, Netherlands)	2020	

== See also ==
- Foreign relations of Senegal
- List of diplomatic missions in Senegal
- Visa policy of Senegal
