= Australia–Senegal relations =

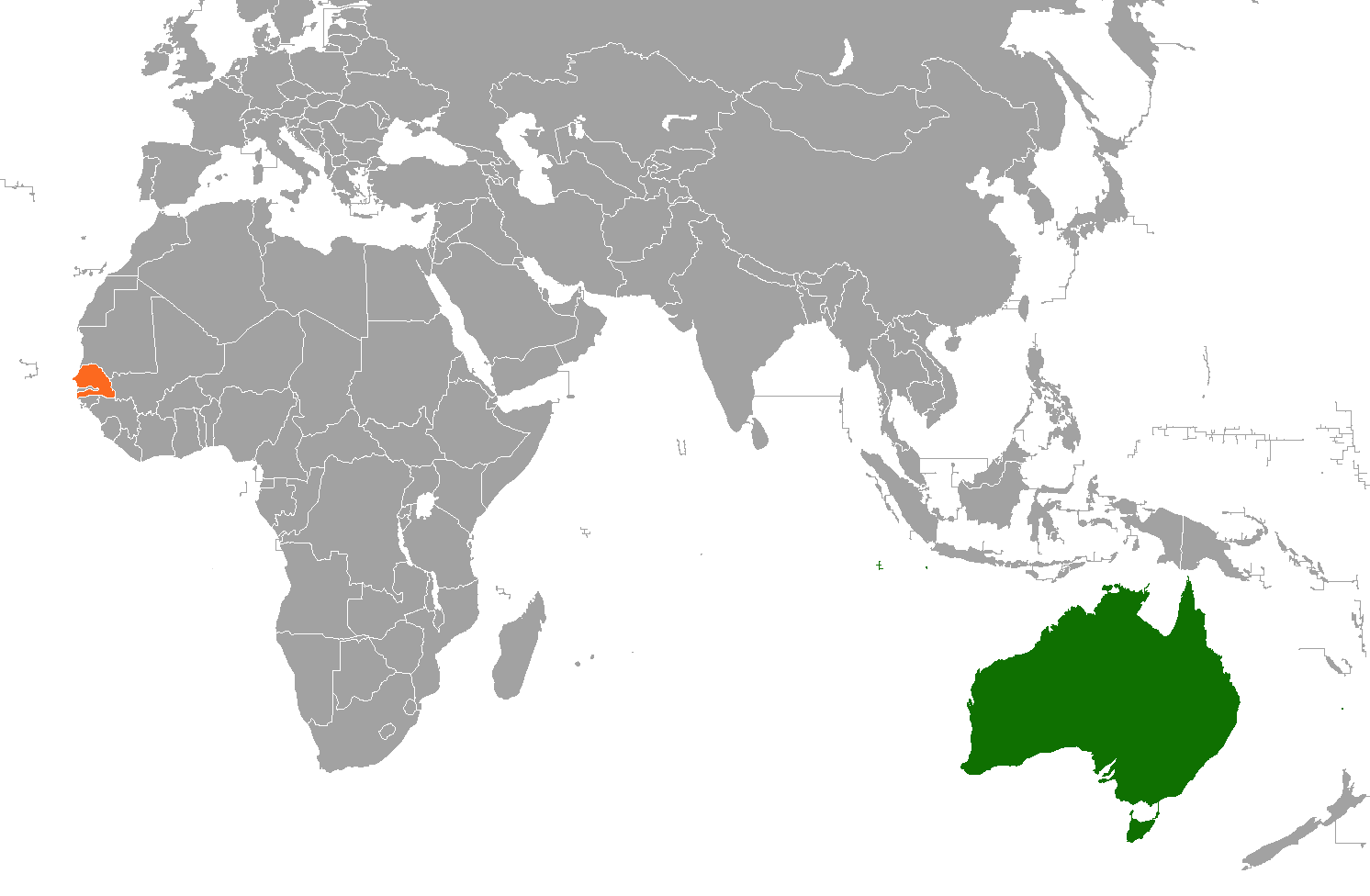

- Australia: Senegal

Monthly value of Australian merchandise exports to Senegal (A$ millions) since 1988

Bilateral relations exist between Australia and Senegal. Senegal has a non-resident ambassador in Tokyo. Australia has a non-resident ambassador in Accra.

== Diplomacy ==
Until 2004, Australia's High Commissioner to Nigeria was accredited to Senegal (along with Ghana and the Gambia). Bob Whitty held this position from January 2001, followed by Iain Cameron Dickie from February 2004. In 2004 an Australian High Commission was opened in Ghana, and the High Commissioner was accredited to Senegal (along with Burkina Faso, Ivory Coast, Guinea, Liberia, Mali, Sierra Leone and Togo). Jonathan Richardson was the first High Commissioner in this role, then William Williams held the position until February 2012, when he was replaced by Joanna Adamson.

Senegal is currently accredited to Australia through its embassy in Tokyo, Japan.

It was announced in May 2012 that Australia would establish an embassy in Dakar, Senegal, which would be the first Australian embassy in a French-speaking African nation. This promise helped to deliver African votes for Australia to obtain a seat on the United Nations Security Council in October 2012. In May 2013, the promise was indefinitely delayed due to budget cuts at the Department of Foreign Affairs and Trade under the Gillard Government.

== Trade ==
Senegal's 2003 mining code is based on those of Australia and Canada. Senegal's Director of Mines and Geology actively promotes Australian mining investment. Several mining companies listed on the Australian Securities Exchange including BHP, Mineral Deposits Limited, Bassari Resources, Erin Resources, and First Australian Resources (partnered with Petrosen, Senegal's national oil company), have projects in Senegal, primarily mining gold, mineral sands, and oil and gas.

== See also ==
- Foreign relations of Australia
- Foreign relations of Senegal
