= Russia–Senegal relations =

- Russia: Senegal

Russia–Senegal relations are the bilateral foreign relations between Russia and Senegal. Russian has an embassy in Dakar and Senegal has an embassy in Moscow.

== Bilateral Relations ==
The Soviet Union established diplomatic relations with Senegal on June 14, 1962. Political relations are stable. In September 2007, Foreign Minister Sergei Lavrov visited Senegal on an official visit, during which he held talks with Senegalese President Abdoulaye Wade, Prime Minister and Minister of Foreign Affairs. On 18–21 June 2018, the President of Senegal, Macky Sall, went to Moscow to attend the 2018 FIFA World Cup opening ceremony.

== See also ==
- Foreign relations of Russia
- Foreign relations of Senegal
- List of ambassadors of Russia to Senegal
