= Senegal–Turkey relations =

- Senegal: Turkey

Senegal–Turkey relations are the bilateral relations between Senegal and Turkey. Turkey has an embassy in Dakar since 1962. Senegal has an embassy in Ankara which was opened in August 2006. Both countries are members of the Organisation of Islamic Cooperation.

== Diplomatic relations ==
Turkey and Senegal historically have had very friendly relations.

Turkey assisted Senegal while it was going through the Sahel drought of 1966–1973 that coincided with France’s abandonment of colonial support. Mindful that the population growth far outstripped economic growth in Senegal, Turkey has constructed and subsequently managed schools in Senegal through the Maarif Foundation.

Turkey was particularly supportive of Abdou Diouf, who was considered a brilliant and technocratic prime minister. Turkey supported Abdou Diouf’s liberalization of the political process whereby he allowed a further 13 political parties to run for the 1983 election.

== Presidential visits ==
Guest	Host	Place of visit	Date of visit
(Turkey) President Recep Tayyip Erdoğan	(Senegal) President Macky Sall	Dakar	February 28, 2018
(Senegal) President Macky Sall	(Turkey) President Recep Tayyip Erdoğan	Presidential Complex, Ankara	May 3, 2019
(Turkey) President Recep Tayyip Erdoğan	(Senegal) President Macky Sall	Dakar	January 20, 2020

== Economic relations ==
- Trade volume between the two countries was US$292 million in 2018.
- There are daily direct flights from Istanbul to Dakar.
- TIKA’s Western Africa headquarters is located in Dakar since April 2007.

== Education cooperation ==
- Turkish Maarif Foundation runs schools in Senegal and the Turkish government has been granting scholarships to Senegalese students since 1992.

== See also ==
- Foreign relations of Senegal
- Foreign relations of Turkey
