= Senegal–Spain relations =

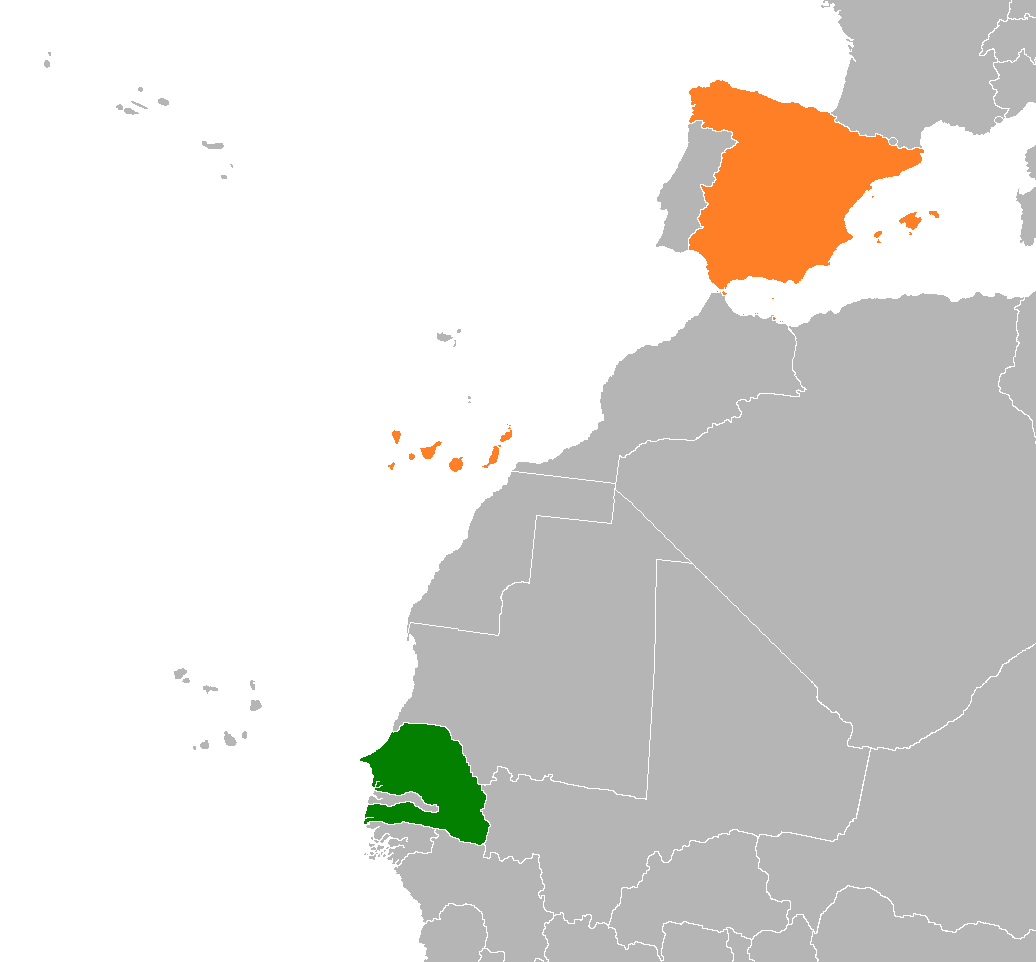
- Senegal: Spain

Senegal–Spain relations are the bilateral and diplomatic relations between these two countries. Senegal has an embassy in Madrid. Spain has an embassy in Dakar.

== History ==
Diplomatic relations between Spain and Senegal have followed an uninterrupted and friendly line since 3 March 1965, shortly after its proclamation as an independent Republic. The Senegalese Embassy in Spain, however, closed the embassy between 1991 and 2001 for budgetary reasons, during which the steps were taken from the Embassy of the African country in Paris. After the reopening of the Representation in Madrid, there has been an intensification of institutional contacts at all levels, relaunching bilateral relations that, although historically characterized by their low intensity, have not ceased to grow.

Stresses the visit of S.M. Queen Doña Sofía in greater than 2006, accompanied by the SECI that takes place within the framework of a visit to several projects of Spanish Cooperation and the growing involvement of Spain in humanitarian projects in Senegal. The real turning point in relations came from the summer of 2006, on the occasion of the cayucos crisis, which implied the massive arrival of almost 30,000 Senegalese immigrants along the Canary Islands. From then on, relations began to be based on the search for a common strategy in the fight against illegal immigration, and they were maturing throughout 2006 and 2007 until they became a true partnership that far exceeds the scope of Migrations As a result of this new approach, visits by delegations of the Ministries of Interior, Foreign Affairs, Justice and Labor and Social Affairs began to occur frequently, culminating in December 2006 with the first visit of a President of the Government Spanish, José Luis Rodríguez Zapatero, to the Republic of Senegal.

In light of the crisis, Spain and Senegal reached an August 2006 agreement so that Senegal collaborated in the joint patrolling of the African coastal waters under the purview of the Frontex's Operation HERA II. The Spanish State thus deployed two patrol boats to Senegal ("Río Ara" and "Río Cabriel") and the Guardia Civil's SEMAR donated another two more to the Senegalese State, with mixed Spanish-Senegalese patrols remaining in operation after 2007. The Spanish State's security investments in Senegal also include a permanently deployed detachment of the Civil Guard in Senegal.

A full-fledged centre of the Instituto Cervantes, the first opened in Sub-Saharan Africa, was inaugurated in Dakar on 13 December 2021.

== Cooperation ==
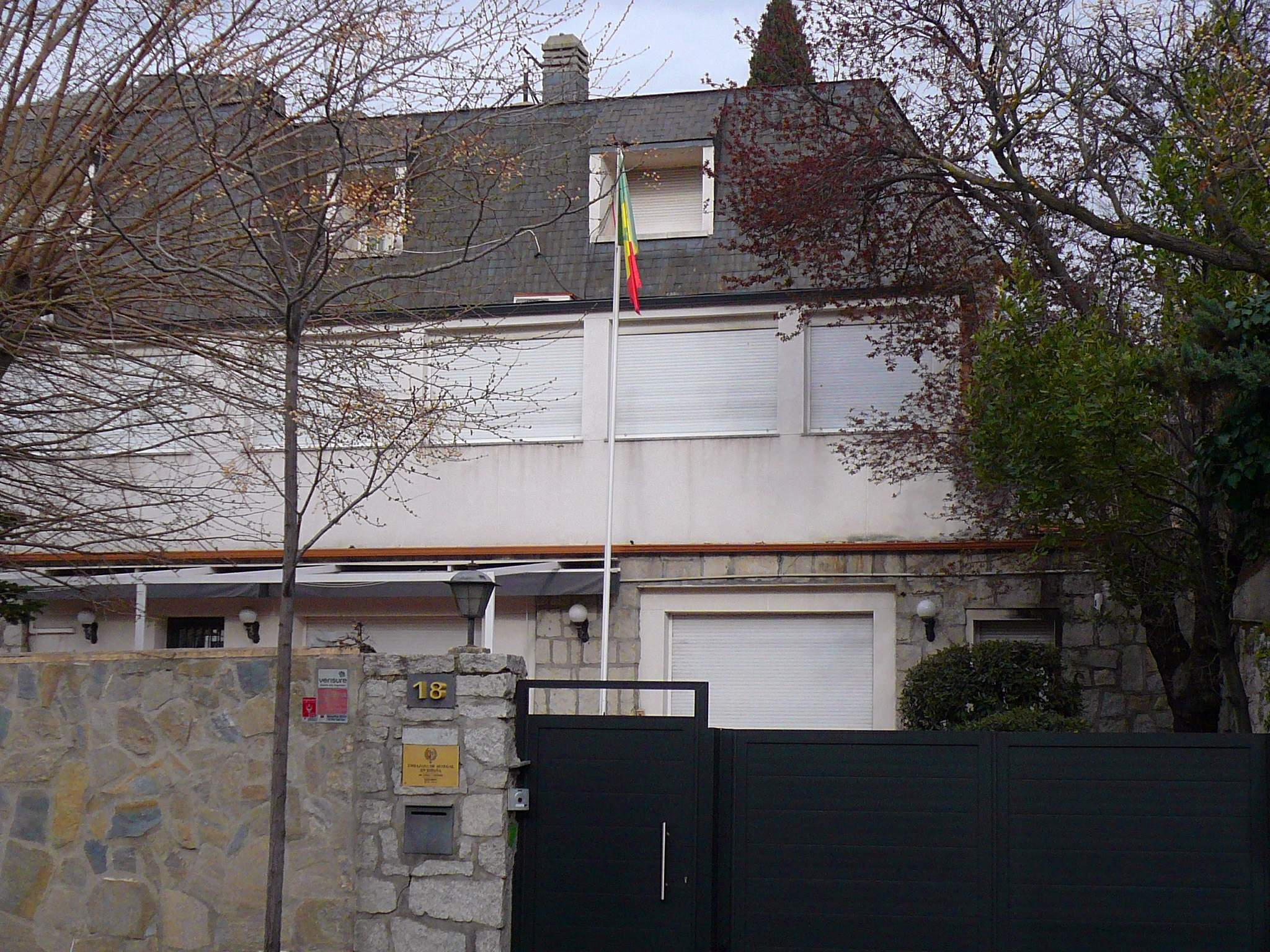
Embassy of Senegal in Madrid

On the other hand, an extensive cooperation program was developed that placed special emphasis on the provision of resources to Senegalese authorities for the surveillance of their territory as well as the strengthening of their capacities. Since then and to this day, relations with the Republic of Senegal have seen tremendous growth, and institutional visits in both directions have continued to take place at the highest level. On the Senegalese side, the continuous visits of the Minister of Interior Ngom, as well as the trips in 2007 of President Wade; to the Canary Islands on the occasion of the inauguration of Casa África and to Madrid to attend the First Conference of the Alliance of Civilizations. More recently, the visit in 2009 of the Minister of Foreign Affairs Cheikh Tidiane Gadio, for the signing of the Joint Cooperation Commission, the visit to Madrid of the Minister of Foreign Affairs Madické Niang (2009), as well as others such as that of the Ministers of Foreign Affairs Maritime Economy (2010), Justice (2011) and Armed Forces (2011).

== Cultural relations ==
Senegal–Spain cultural relations have been shaped in part by the transnational activities of Senegal’s Mouride Sufi brotherhood, which provides both spiritual guidance and material assistance to Senegalese migrants in the Canary Islands. In February 2025, a three-storey Mouride circle in Gran Canaria began hosting mostly teenage students from Senegal, many of whom had arrived via the increasingly perilous Atlantic route that brought nearly 47,000 migrants to the archipelago in 2024, offering them communal meals, religious instruction, and temporary shelter in a residential neighbourhood. Founded in the late 19th century by Amadou Bamba, who preached non-violent resistance against French colonial rule and was later exiled (1880–1910), the Mouride order now comprises roughly 40 percent of Senegal’s Muslim population and organizes an annual Grand Magal pilgrimage to its headquarters in Touba every September. The Gran Canaria dahira channels local and diaspora remittances, contributing €25,000 of the €150,000 sent back from Spain in 2024, to maintain community services on the island and support mosque construction and social projects in Senegal. Periodic visits from religious teachers reinforce these bonds.

== Trade ==
All imports from Senegal to Spain are duty-free and quota-free, with the exception of armaments, as part of the Everything but Arms initiative of the European Union.

== Official visits ==
The President of the Government, Mariano Rajoy, and the President of the Republic, Macky Sall, held a meeting on the margins of the United Nations General Assembly on 25 September 2012. Also, as above, they held an official meeting in Madrid on 15 December 2014.

The Secretary of State for Foreign Affairs, Gonzalo de Benito, visited Dakar on 22 and 23 November 2012. The Secretary of State for International Cooperation and For Latin America, Jesús Gracia, visited Dakar on 2 December 2013. On 3 February 2014 took place the visit to Dakar of the Secretary of State for Security, Francisco Martínez. The Minister of Industry, Energy and Tourism, José Manuel Soria, visited Dakar on 10 March 2014.

Spanish Prime Minister Pedro Sánchez made an official visit to Senegal on 8–9 April 2021 on an invitation from Senegalese President Macky Sall. Both signed a joint declaration and two memorandums of understanding concerning collaboration on migration policies.

== See also ==
- Foreign relations of Senegal
- Foreign relations of Spain
