= Senegal–United Kingdom relations =

- Senegal: United Kingdom

Diplomatic mission
- Embassy of Senegal, London: Embassy of the United Kingdom, Dakar

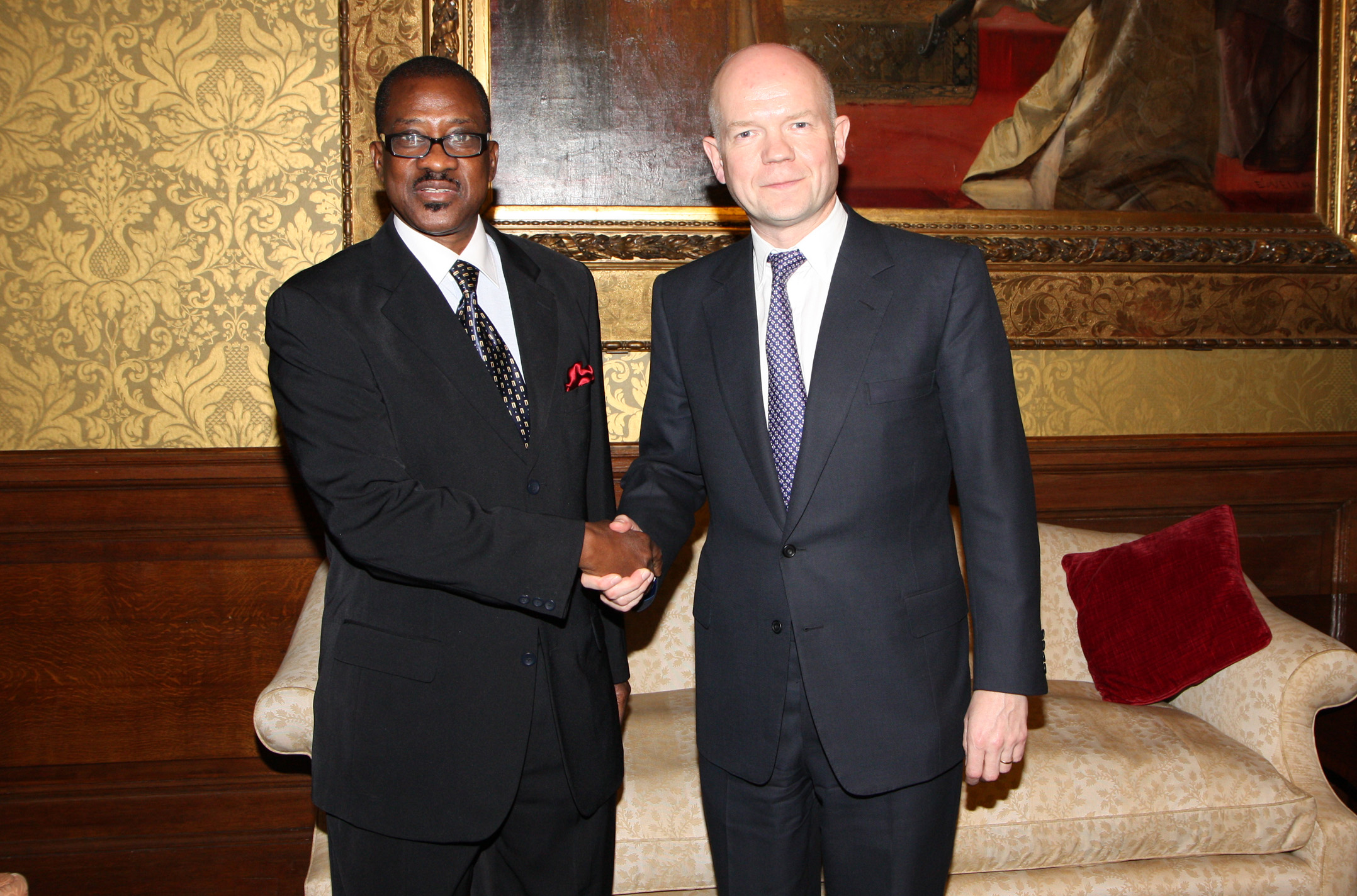
Senegalese Foreign Minister Madické Niang with British Foreign Secretary William Hague in London, November 2010.

Senegal–United Kingdom relations refer to the diplomatic, historical, economic, and cultural ties between the Republic of Senegal and the United Kingdom of Great Britain and Northern Ireland. The bilateral relationship is characterized by cooperation in areas including development assistance, trade, security, education, and regional diplomacy in West Africa.

Both countries share common membership of the Atlantic Co-operation Pact, the International Criminal Court, and the World Trade Organization. Bilaterally the two countries have a Defence Cooperation Agreement, a Double Tax Convention, an Investment Agreement, and a Technical Cooperation Agreement.

== Diplomatic missions ==
- Senegal maintains an embassy in London.
- The United Kingdom is accredited to Senegal through its embassy in Dakar.

== See also ==
- Foreign relations of Senegal
- Foreign relations of the United Kingdom
