= India–Senegal relations =

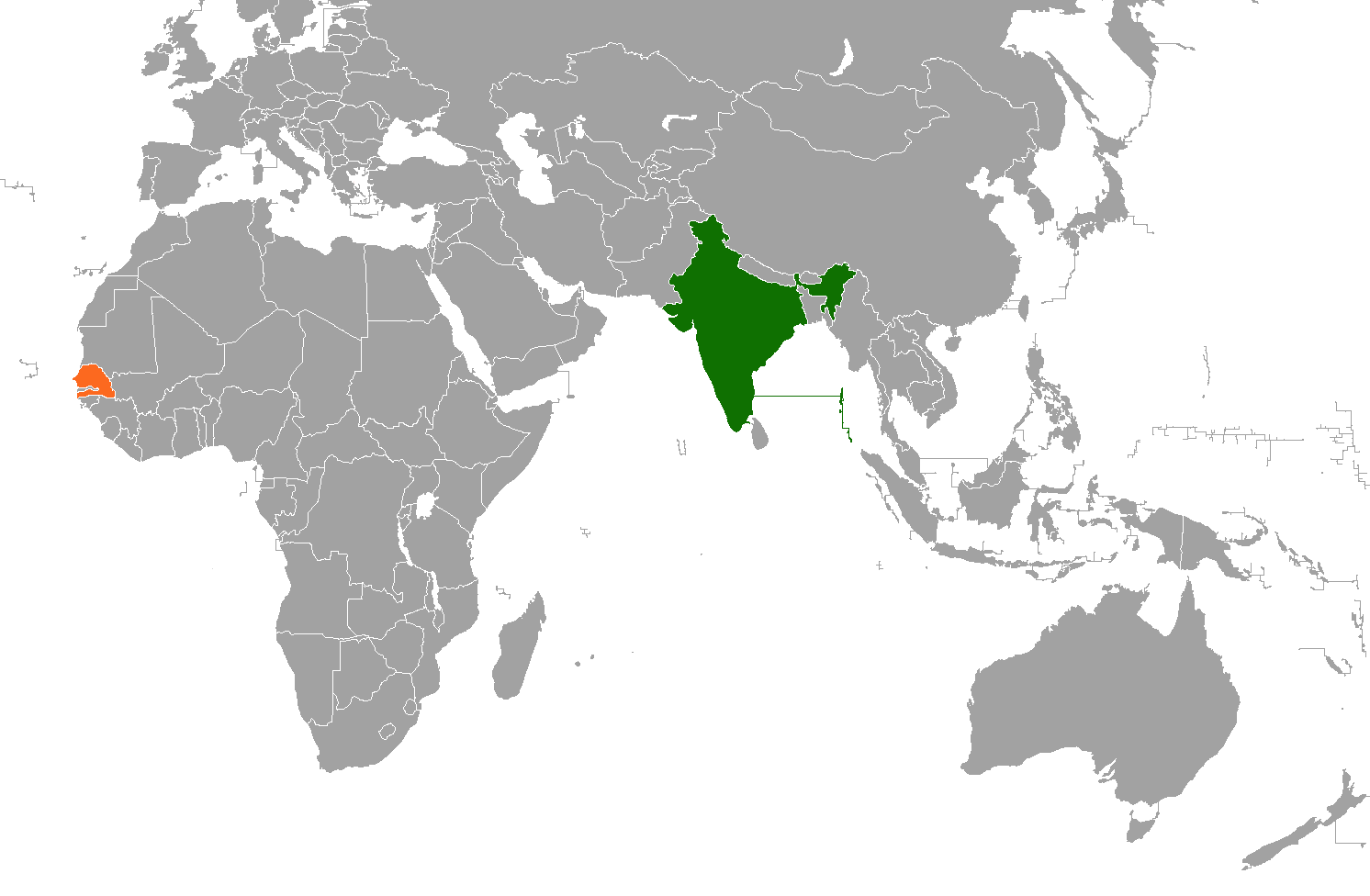
- India: Senegal

India–Senegal relations are bilateral diplomatic relations between India and Senegal. India maintains an embassy in Dakar and Senegal in New Delhi. Although people to people contacts have been limited, the two countries enjoy warm relations and in recent years trade and investment have been increasing steadily.

== History ==
India and Senegal have had close and cordial relations since the latter gained its independence from France in 1960. Diplomatic relations between the two countries were established at the ambassadorial level with the establishment of a resident Indian mission in Dakar in 1962. The two countries share common values of democracy, development and secularism and have been supportive of each other on international fora. Senegal has been supportive of India's quest for membership in the Organisation of Islamic Cooperation and the two countries initiated the Team-9 project that also involves seven other west and central African countries.

== Indians and Indian Culture in Senegal ==
Unlike eastern or southern Africa that have large populations of Indians and Persons of Indian Origin, the Indian community in Senegal is tiny amounting to only some 300 individuals who run businesses or are involved in the execution of projects being undertaken under lines of credit provided by India. However, Senegal is often described as the most Indophile of West African nations and it has been influenced by a range of Indian cultural institutions ranging from Hindi cinema to the concept of caste and outcastes. There are dozens of Indo-Senegalese friendship societies and film clubs and Indian music and cuisine are popular in Senegal as are Bollywood movies and dance and Indian television serials like Vaidehi. The Senegalese singer Akon, who sings in Hindi, became a sensation in India for his rendition of Chammak Challo in the Bollywood movie Ra.One.

== Economic Ties ==
=== Trade ===
Trade between India and Senegal amounted to $425 million in 2009–10 with India enjoying a small surplus in the balance of trade. Trade doubled in 5 years from 2002 to 2003, when it is stood at $222 million. Phosphates and iron scrap constitute the bulk of Indian imports from Senegal while its exports consist of textiles, automobiles, pharmaceuticals and food items. India is among Senegal's top trade partners. Senegal imports rolling stock for its railways from India. Both Indian Railways and RITES have been involved in providing a range of services to the Senegal Railways including providing consultancy services, conducting feasibility studies and providing rolling stock including diesel multiple units, engines and railway compartments. The two countries entered into a Bilateral Investment Promotion and Protection Agreement in 2005 and a Double Taxation Avoidance Agreement in 2007.

=== Economic Cooperation ===
In 2003, the Government of India provided a line of credit worth $2 billion to a group of 9 West African nations, including Senegal, called Team-9. Senegal revamped its urban public transportation system through an Indo-Senegalese joint venture that assembled Tata buses in the Senegalese town of Thies. India's decision to allow duty-free imports from Least Developed Countries has benefitted Senegal and India's Exim Bank provided the country with a $28 million line of credit to help it access consultancy services and equipment for undertaking a rural electrification programme.

=== Investments ===
Senegal has welcomed Indian investments in that country in a range of sectors including textiles, chemicals and manufacturing. In 2006 ArcelorMittal entered into an agreement with the Government of Senegal for the production of iron ore in south eastern Senegal through investments amounting to $2 billion. Since Senegalese law requires Asian companies that are awarded infrastructure contracts to partner with Senegalese companies, joint ventures with Indian companies have been an important means of transferring technological know how and training to Senegal. Senegal's largest industrial complex, the Industries Chimiques du Senegal (ICS), is a joint venture between Senegal and India involving the Indian fertiliser major IFFCO and it exports much of its phosphate output to India. IFFCO in 2007 undertook a $100 million project to revive the 6.6 lakh tonne capacity phosphoric acid plant of the Industries Chimiques de Senegal to raise its production to optimum levels.

== Technical Cooperation ==
India provides scholarships for training Senegalese personnel under its Indian Technical and Economic Cooperation Programme. Senegal is also part of India's Pan-African e-Network project that allows it to tap Indian expertise through telemedicine and teleeducation. A hub earth station of the network is located in the Sebikotane village of Senegal. Senegal, once the largest importer of rice in Africa, sought technological support from India for increasing its rice production in 2008. In 2011, speaking at the Africa-India Forum Summit at Addis Ababa in 2011, Senegal's President Abdoulaye Wade noted that India's assistance had helped his country "in increasing rice production so dramatically that it has gone from being an importer to an exporter in a matter of four years".

== See also ==
- Embassy of India, Dakar
