= Senegal–United States relations =

- Senegal: United States

Senegal–United States relations are bilateral relations between Senegal and the United States.

Senegal is one of the most pro-American nations in the world, with 69% of its people viewing the U.S. favorably, increasing to 81% in 2013, going down somewhat to 74% in 2014. According to the 2012 U.S. Global Leadership Report, 79% of the Senegalese approve of U.S. leadership, with 20% disapproving.

== History ==
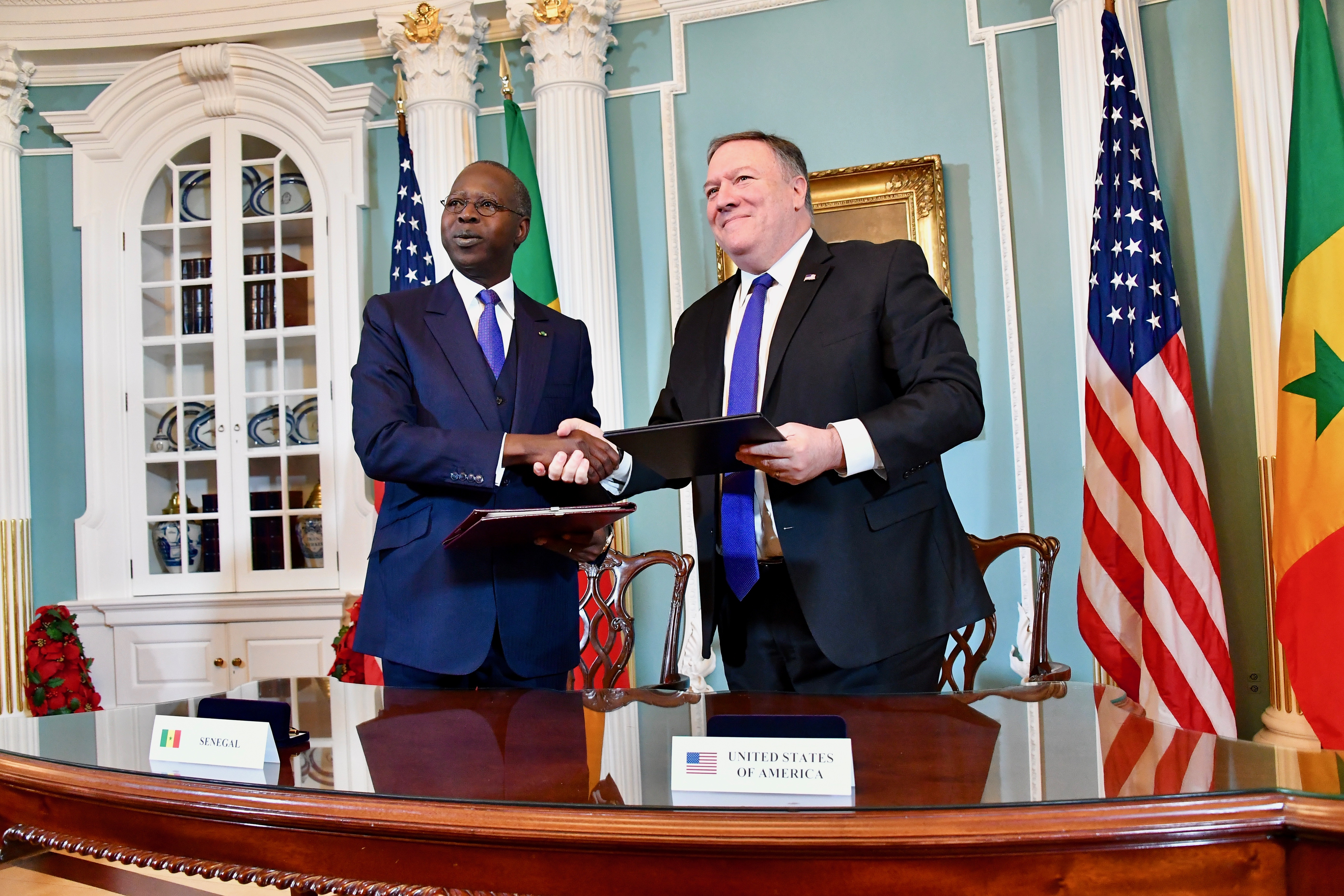
Senegalese Prime Minister Mahammed Boun Abdallah Dionne (left) and US Secretary of State Michael Pompeo (right) in December 2018

In November 1961 Senegalese President Léopold Sédar Senghor visited the White House, where a dinner was held.

About 300 Senegalese students come to the United States each year for study. President Diouf paid his first official visit to Washington, D.C., in August 1983 and traveled several times to the U.S. thereafter. Senegal was President George W. Bush's first stop in his July 2003 visit to Africa. In June 2001, President Wade met President Bush at the White House. Senegal hosted the Second African-African American Summit in 1995. First Lady Hillary Clinton began her trip to Africa in March 1997 with a visit to Senegal, and President Bill Clinton visited Senegal in 1998. Assistant Secretary for African Affairs Walter Kansteiner visited Senegal in August 2001. Foreign Minister Gadio met Secretary of State Colin Powell in September and November 2001. Senegal took a strong position against terrorism in the wake of the September 11, 2001 terrorist attacks against the U.S., and in October 2001 hosted a conference establishing the African Pact Against Terrorism. On July 20, 2005, Secretary Rice attended the fourth annual African Growth and Opportunity Act (AGOA) Forum held in Dakar, Senegal. That year's Forum focused on increasing investment initiatives and facilitating economic and political development in Africa. In June 2007, First Lady Laura Bush made Senegal her first stop during a four country Africa tour in support of the President's Malaria Initiative (PMI) and the President Emergency Plan for AIDS Relief (PEPFAR).

The U.S. Agency for International Development (USAID) implements the U.S. Government's development assistance program. USAID's strategy focuses on promoting economic growth/private sector development by expanding microfinance and business development services and commercializing natural and non-traditional products; improving local delivery of services and sustainable use of resources; increasing use of decentralized health services; and improving middle school education, especially for girls. In addition, there is a conflict resolution and rehabilitation program to improve conditions for peace in Senegal's two southern regions known as the "Casamance". USAID will provide $29.9 million in development assistance to Senegal in fiscal year 2005.

The Peace Corps program in Senegal has approximately 150 volunteers serving in agriculture, forestry, health, and small business development. The U.S. Embassy's Cultural Affairs Section administers the Fulbright, Humphrey, and International Visitor exchange programs. The Fulbright teacher, researcher, and lecturer programs are two-way exchanges; hence the section also supports American grantees in Senegal during their stay. In addition to exchanges, the section organizes numerous programs for the Senegalese public including U.S. speaker programs, fine arts programs, film festivals, and a book club. Finally, the section organizes an annual regional colloquium for American Studies professionals, journalists, and civic leaders from over 15 countries in Africa.

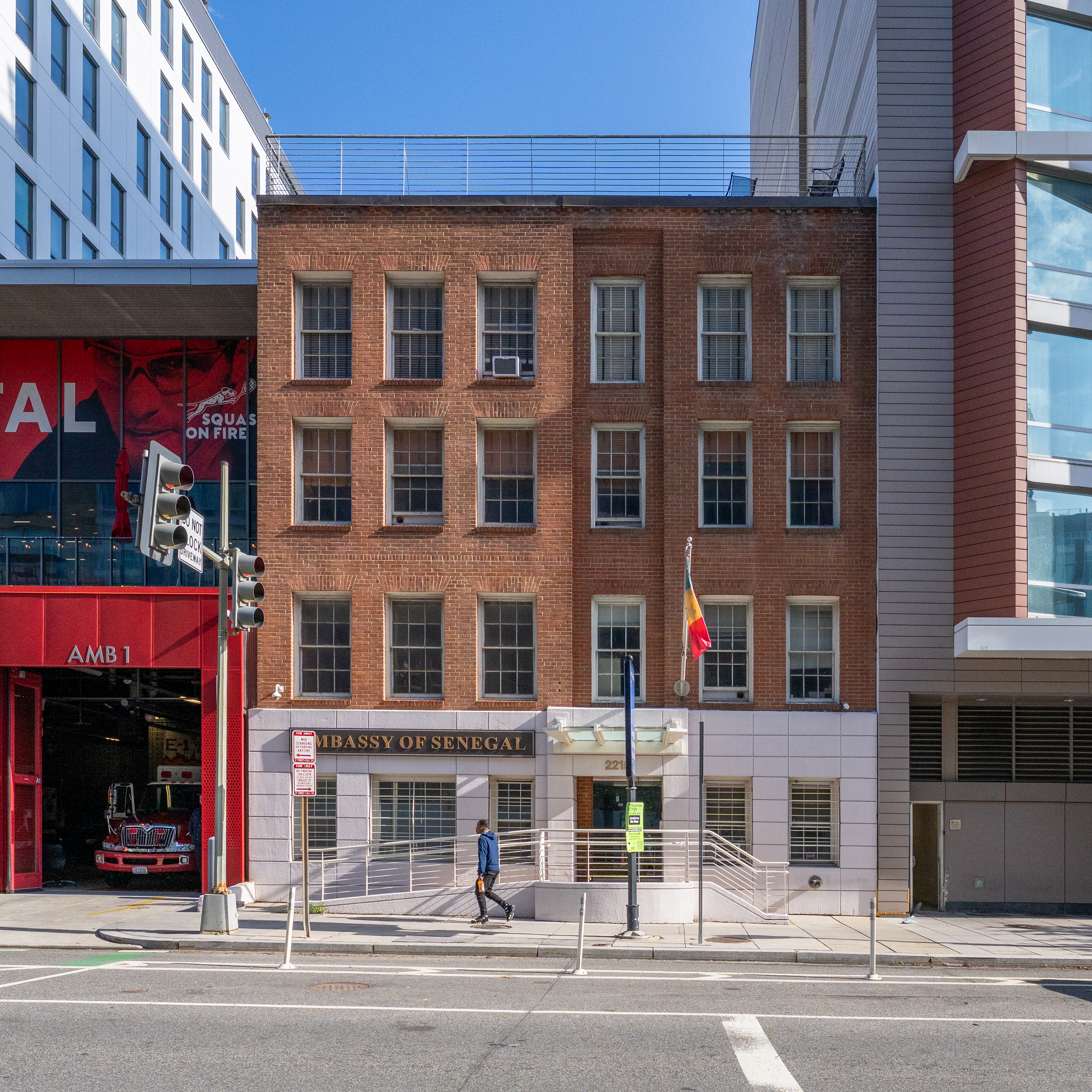
Embassy of Senegal at 2215 M Street NW in Washington, D.C.

== Embassies ==
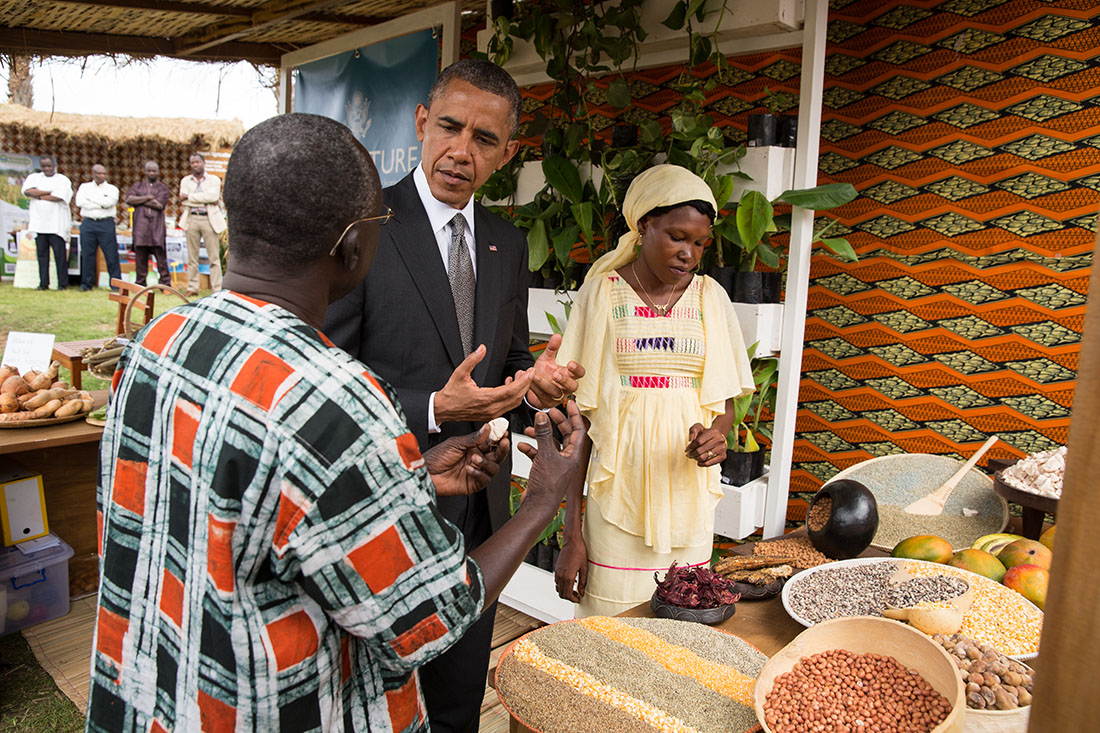
President Barack Obama talks with exhibitors as he tours the Feed the Future Agricultural Technology Expo in Dakar, Senegal, June 28, 2013.

The principal missions relating to the two countries' bilateral relations are the Embassy of the United States, Dakar and the Senegalese Embassy in Washington, D.C.

== List of relevant U.S officials ==
Principal U.S. Officials include:

- Ambassador—Michael A. Raynor
- Deputy Chief of Mission—Jonathan Fischer
- USAID Director—Kevin Mullaly
- Peace Corps Director—Cheryl Faye
- Defense Attaché—COL Darryl E. Dennis, USAR
- Office of Defense Cooperation – COL Ross Clemmons
- Political Counselor—David Mosby
- Economic Counselor—Wallace Bain
- Public Affairs Officer—Robin Diallo
- Consular Officer—James David Loveland
- Management Officer—Salvatore Piazza

== See also ==
- Senegalese Americans
- Foreign relations of Senegal
- Foreign relations of the United States
