= Mexico–Senegal relations =

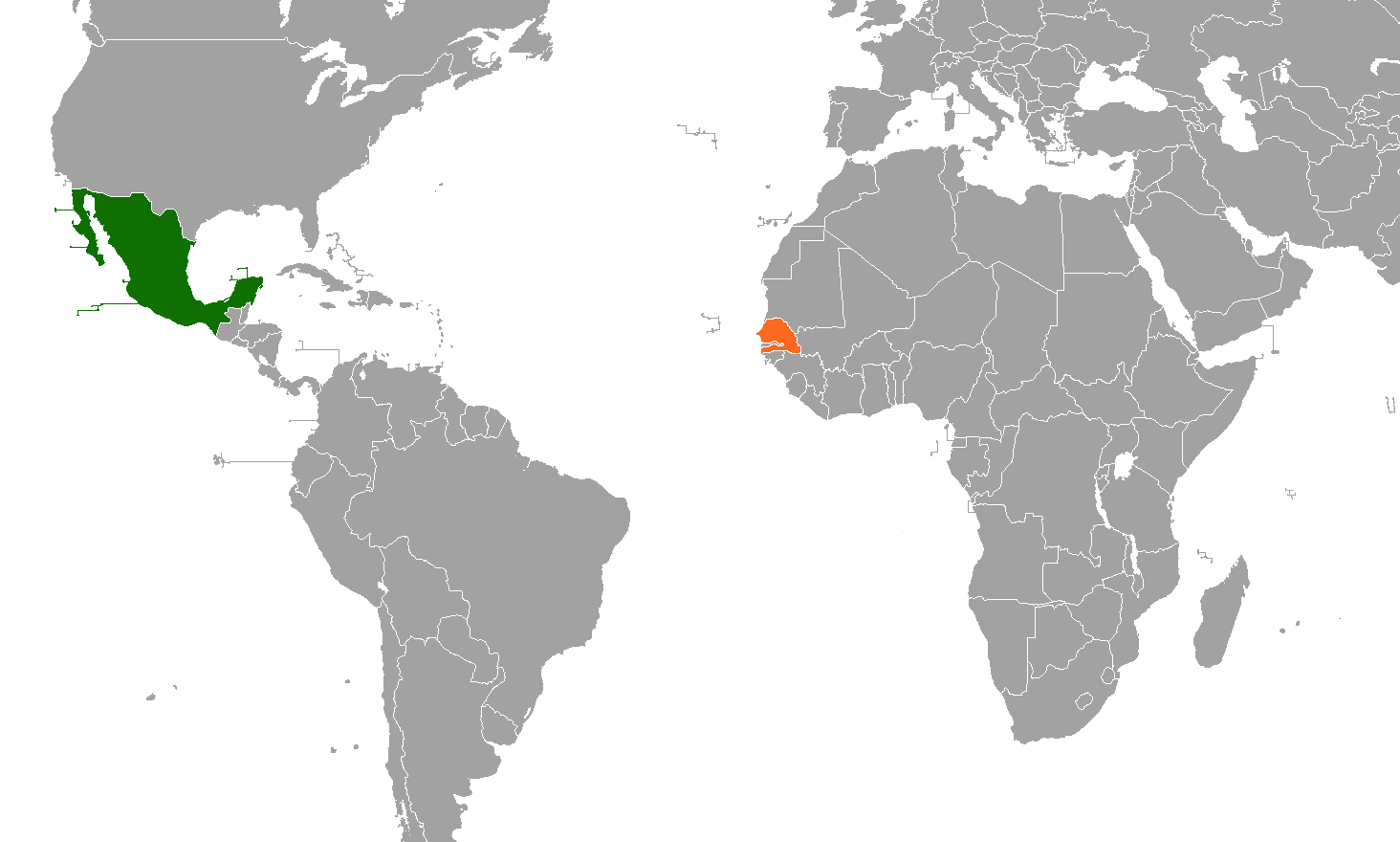

- Mexico: Senegal

The nations of Mexico and Senegal established diplomatic relations in 1962. Both nations are members of the Group of 15 and the United Nations.

== History ==
In April 1960, Senegal obtained its independence from France. In 1961, Mexican President Adolfo López Mateos sent a presidential delegation of goodwill, led by Special Envoy Alejandro Carrillo Marcor and Delegate José Ezequiel Iturriaga, to visit Senegal and to pave the way for the establishment of diplomatic relations between both nations. On 10 May 1962, Mexico and Senegal established diplomatic relations.

In 1972, Mexican Architect Pedro Ramírez Vázquez was asked by President Senghor to design The Museum of Black Cultures in Dakar. The museum was never built, however, its premise was used for the Museum of Black Civilisations which was inaugurated in 2011.

In 1974, Mexican Foreign Secretary Emilio Óscar Rabasa paid a visit to Senegal in preparation of the visit by President Luis Echeverría. In 1976, Mexico opened a resident embassy in Dakar. In May 1975, Senegalese President Léopold Sédar Senghor paid a visit to Mexico. In July 1975, Mexican President Luis Echeverría reciprocated the visit and paid a state visit to Senegal, becoming the first sitting Mexican President to visit Africa.

In 1982, the Association of Friends of Mexico in Senegal was formed, with the appointment of former President Senghor as honorary President. The objective was to create direct links between the two countries for mutual understanding.

In 1991, Mexican Foreign Secretary Fernando Solana paid a visit to Senegal. That same year, Mexico closed its embassy in Senegal and in 1993, Mexico opened an honorary consulate in Dakar. In March 2002, Senegalese President Abdoulaye Wade paid a visit to the northern Mexican city of Monterrey to attend the International Conference on Financing for Development.

In November 2014, Mexican Foreign Undersecretary, Carlos de Icaza, travelled to Dakar to attend the Organisation internationale de la Francophonie conference, where Mexico was admitted as an observer to the organization. In 2022, both nations celebrated 60 years of diplomatic relations.

In previous years, there has been an increase of migrants crossing into Mexico en route to the Mexico–United States border. By early 2024, more than 20,000 Senegalese nationals entered Mexico to attempt entering the United States.

== High-level visits ==
High-level visits from Mexico to Senegal

- Special Envoy Alejandro Carrillo Marcor (1961)
- Delegate José Ezequiel Iturriaga (1961)
- Foreign Secretary Emilio Óscar Rabasa (1974)
- President Luis Echeverría (1975)
- Foreign Secretary Fernando Solana (1991)
- Foreign Undersecretary Lourdes Aranda (2013)
- Foreign Undersecretary Carlos de Icaza (2014)

High-level visits from Senegal to Mexico

- President Léopold Sédar Senghor (1975)
- President Abdoulaye Wade (2002)
- Minister of State Djibo Leyti Kâ (2010)

== Bilateral agreements ==
Both nations have signed a few bilateral agreements such as an Agreement on Cinematic Coproduction (1975); Agreement on Tourism (1975); Agreement on Cultural and Scientific Cooperation (1975); and an Agreement on Technical Cooperation (1975).

== Trade ==
In 2023, trade between Mexico and Senegal totaled US$54.8 million. Mexico's main exports to Senegal include: malt extract and food preparation, articles of iron or steel, medicines, machinery parts, gas generators, instruments and appliances for machines, and fish. Senegal's main exports to Mexico include: pumps for liquid, motors, electronic equipment, machinery, seafood, articles of iron or steel, parts and accessories for motor vehicles, plastic, and minerals.

== Diplomatic missions ==
- Mexico is accredited to Senegal from its embassy in Rabat, Morocco. and maintains an honorary consulate in Dakar.
- Senegal is accredited to Mexico from its embassy in Washington, D.C., United States and maintains an honorary consulate in Mexico City.
