= List of diplomatic missions in Senegal =

This is a list of diplomatic missions in Senegal. The capital, Dakar, currently hosts 84 embassies. A former French colony, Senegal is a regional power in western Africa.

This listing excludes honorary consulates.

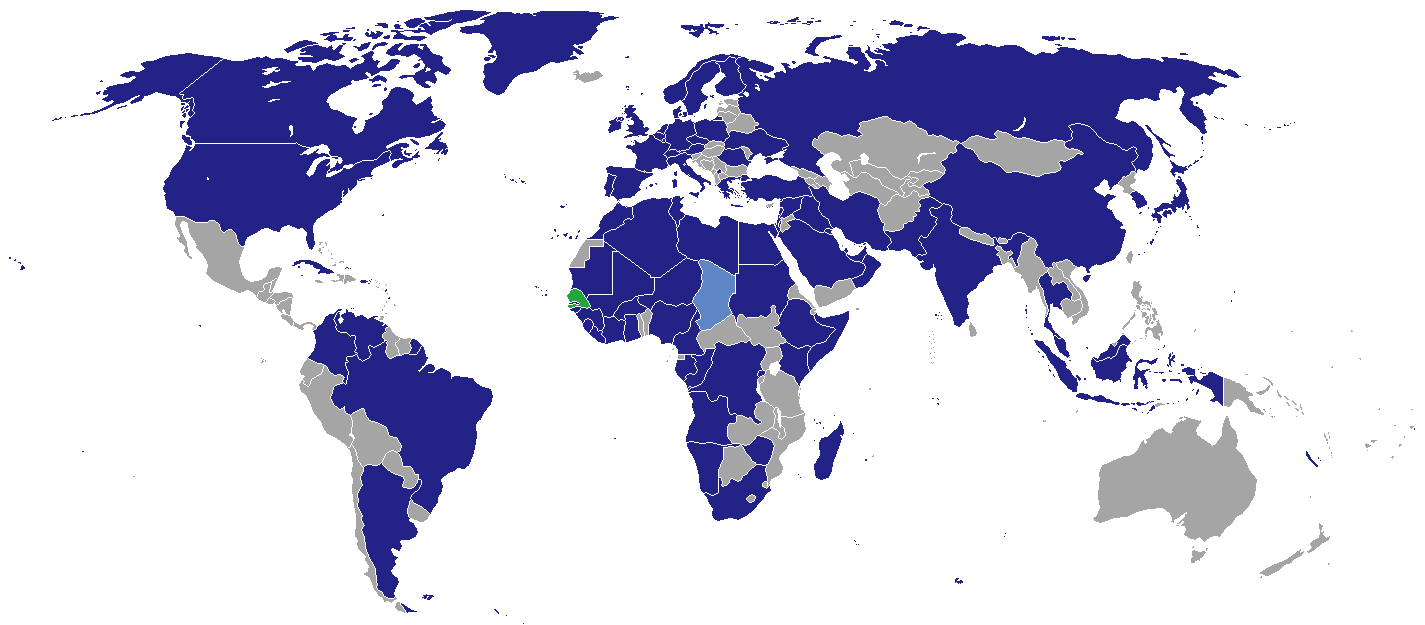
Map of diplomatic missions in Senegal

== Diplomatic missions in Dakar ==
=== Embassies ===
1. Algeria
2. Angola
3. Argentina
4. Austria
5. Belgium
6. Brazil
7. Burkina Faso
8. Cameroon
9. Canada
10. Cape Verde
11. China
12. Colombia
13. Congo-Brazzaville
14. Congo-Kinshasa
15. Comoros
16. Cuba
17. Czechia
18. Denmark
19. Egypt
20. Ethiopia
21. Finland
22. France
23. Gabon
24. Gambia
25. Germany
26. Ghana
27. Greece
28. Guinea
29. Guinea-Bissau
30. Holy See
31. India
32. Indonesia
33. Iran
34. Iraq
35. Ireland
36. Israel
37. Italy
38. Ivory Coast
39. Japan
40. Kenya
41. Kosovo
42. Kuwait
43. Lebanon
44. Liberia
45. Libya
46. Luxembourg
47. Madagascar
48. Malaysia
49. Mali
50. Mauritania
51. Morocco
52. Namibia
53. Netherlands
54. Niger
55. Nigeria
56. Norway
57. Oman
58. Pakistan
59. Palestine
60. Poland
61. Portugal
62. Qatar
63. Romania
64. Russia
65. Rwanda
66. Saudi Arabia
67. Sierra Leone
68. Somalia
69. South Africa
70. South Korea
71. Sovereign Military Order of Malta
72. Spain
73. Sudan
74. Sweden
75. Syria
76. Thailand
77. Tunisia
78. Turkey
79. Ukraine
80. United Arab Emirates
81. United Kingdom
82. United States
83. Venezuela
84. Zimbabwe

=== Other missions or delegations ===
1. European Union (Delegation)
2. Quebec (General Delegation)
3. United Nations (Resident Coordinator's Office)
4. Wallonia (Delegation)

=== Gallery ===
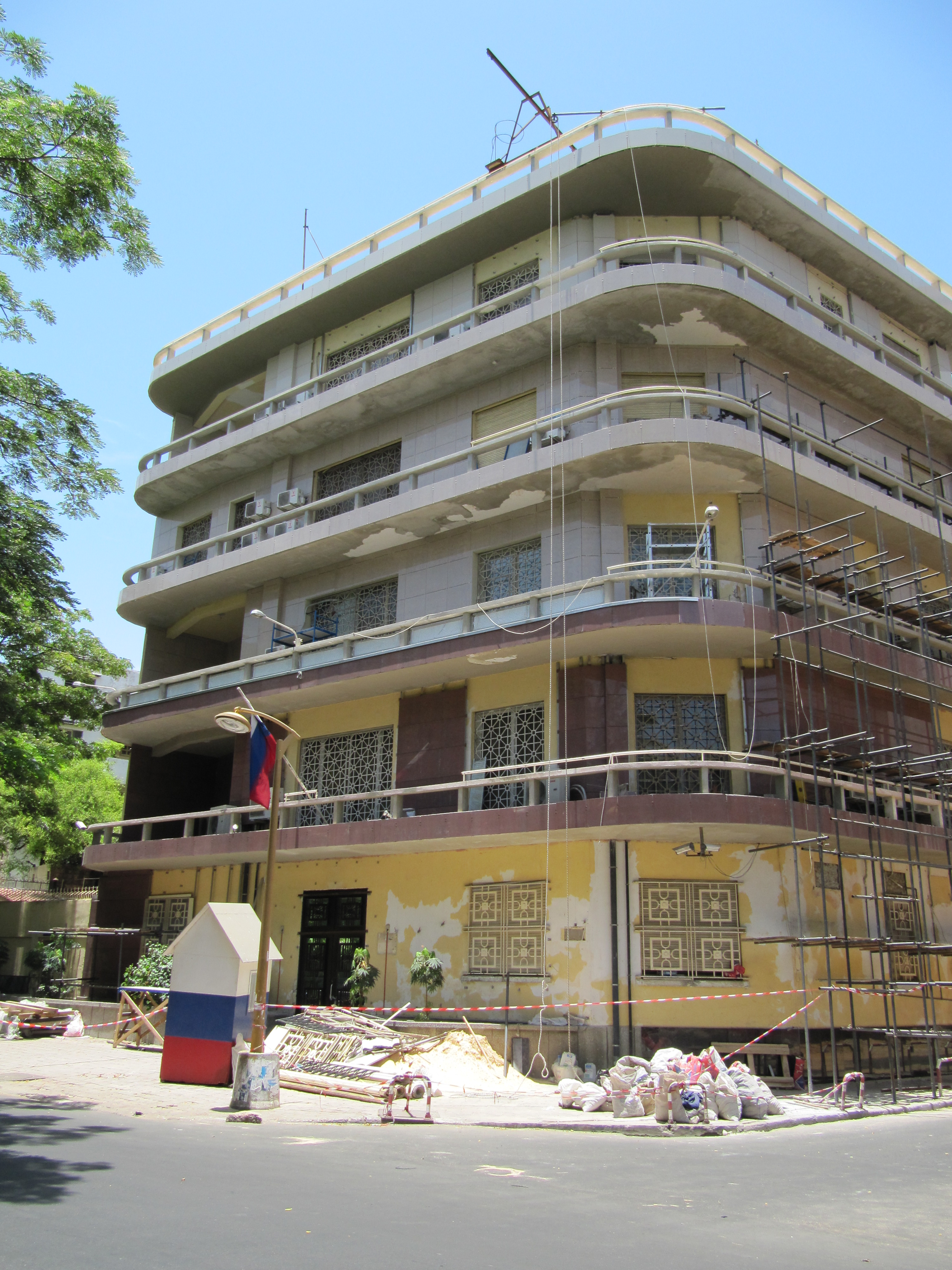
Embassy of Russia

== Consular missions ==
=== Dakar ===
- Chad (Consulate-General)

=== Ziguinchor ===
- Guinea-Bissau (Consulate-General)

== Non-resident embassies accredited to Senegal ==
=== Resident in Abuja, Nigeria ===
- Tanzania
- Trinidad and Tobago
- Zambia

=== Resident in Algiers, Algeria ===
- Kazakhstan
- Slovakia
- Vietnam

=== Resident in Paris, France ===
- Afghanistan
- Armenia
- Costa Rica
- Cyprus
- Estonia
- Haiti
- Honduras
- Iceland
- New Zealand
- Panama
- Tajikistan
- Turkmenistan
- Uruguay
- Uzbekistan

=== Resident in Rabat, Morocco ===
- Azerbaijan
- Bahrain
- Croatia
- Dominican Republic
- Mexico
- Peru
- Philippines
- Serbia

=== Resident in other cities ===
- Australia (Accra)
- Belize (London)
- Bolivia (Madrid)
- Central African Republic (Abidjan)
- Dominica (London)
- Equatorial Guinea (Conakry)
- Malawi (Addis Ababa)
- Seychelles (Addis Ababa)
- Togo (Accra)
- Tonga (London)
- Yemen (Nouakchott)

== Closed missions ==
Host city	Sending country	Mission	Year closed	Ref.
Dakar	Bangladesh	Embassy	Unknown	
Dakar	Cambodia	Embassy	Unknown	
Dakar	Mexico	Embassy	1991	
Dakar	Nicaragua	Embassy	2021	
Dakar	North Korea	Embassy	2023	
Dakar	Philippines	Embassy	1993	
Dakar	Vietnam	Embassy	1980	
Saint Louis	France	Consulate-General	2010	
