= List of diplomatic missions in Washington, D.C. =

This is a list of the 182 resident embassies in Washington, D.C. For other diplomatic missions in the United States, see List of diplomatic missions in the United States.

== Embassies ==
| Embassy | Location | Neighborhood | Image | Reference |
|---|---|---|---|---|
| Albania | 2100 S Street NW 38.913937°N 77.046961°W | Kalorama Heights | | |
| Algeria | 2118 Kalorama Road NW | Kalorama Heights | | |
| Angola | 2108 16th Street NW | U Street | | |
| Antigua and Barbuda | 3234 Prospect Ave NW | Georgetown | | |
| Argentina | 1600 New Hampshire Avenue NW | Dupont Circle | | |
| Armenia | 2225 R Street NW | Embassy Row | | |
| Australia | 1601 Massachusetts Avenue NW | Downtown | | |
| Austria | 3524 International Court NW | North Cleveland Park | | |
| Azerbaijan | 2741 34th Street NW | Embassy Row | | |
| (The Bahamas) Bahamas | 2220 Massachusetts Avenue, NW | Embassy Row | | |
| Bahrain | 3502 International Drive NW | North Cleveland Park | | |
| Bangladesh | 3510 International Drive NW | North Cleveland Park | | |
| Barbados | 2144 Wyoming Avenue NW 38.916944°N 77.048739°W | Kalorama Heights | | |
| Belarus | 1619 New Hampshire Avenue NW | Dupont Circle | | |
| Belgium | 1430 K Street, N.W. | Downtown | | |
| Belize | 2535 Massachusetts Avenue NW | Embassy Row | | |
| Benin | 2124 Kalorama Road NW | Kalorama Heights | | |
| Bolivia | 3014 Massachusetts Avenue NW | Embassy Row | | |
| Bosnia and Herzegovina | 2109 E Street NW | Foggy Bottom | | |
| Botswana | 1531-3 New Hampshire Avenue NW | Dupont Circle | | |
| Brazil | 3006 Massachusetts Avenue NW | Embassy Row | | |
| Brunei | 3520 International Court NW | North Cleveland Park | | |
| Bulgaria | 1621 22nd Street NW | Embassy Row | | |
| Burkina Faso | 2340 Massachusetts Avenue NW | Embassy Row | | |
| Burundi | 2233 Wisconsin Avenue NW | Glover Park | | |
| Cambodia | 4530 16th Street NW | Crestwood | | |
| Cameroon | 2349 Massachusetts Ave NW | Embassy Row | | |
| Canada | 501 Pennsylvania Avenue NW | Penn Quarter | | |
| Cape Verde | 3415 Massachusetts Avenue NW | Embassy Row | | |
| Central African Republic | 2704 Ontario Rd NW | Adams Morgan | | |
| Chad | 2401 Massachusetts Avenue NW | Embassy Row | | |
| Chile | 1732 Massachusetts Avenue NW | Embassy Row | | |
| China | 3505 International Place NW | North Cleveland Park | | |
| Colombia | 1724 Massachusetts Avenue NW | Embassy Row | | |
| (Republic of the Congo) Congo, Republic of the | 1720 16th Street NW | Dupont Circle | | |
| (Democratic Republic of the Congo) Congo, Dem. Republic of the | 1100 Connecticut Ave NW, #725 | Downtown | | |
| Costa Rica | 2114 S Street NW | Kalorama Heights | | |
| Croatia | 2343 Massachusetts Avenue NW | Embassy Row | | |
| Cuba | 2630 16th Street NW | Adams Morgan | | |
| Cyprus | 2211 R Street NW | Kalorama Heights | | |
| Czech Republic | 3900 Spring of Freedom Street NW | Forest Hills | | |
| Denmark | 3200 Whitehaven Street NW | Embassy Row | | |
| Djibouti | 1156 15th Street NW | Downtown | | |
| Dominica | 1001 19th Street North, Suite 1200 | Arlington, Virginia | | |
| Dominican Republic | 1715 22nd Street NW | Kalorama Heights | | |
| Ecuador | 2535 15th Street NW | Columbia Heights | | |
| Egypt | 3521 International Court NW | North Cleveland Park | | |
| El Salvador | 1400 16th Street NW | Dupont Circle | | |
| Equatorial Guinea | 2020 16th Street NW | U Street | | |
| Eritrea | 1708 New Hampshire Ave NW | Dupont Circle | | |
| Estonia | 2131 Massachusetts Avenue NW | Embassy Row | | |
| Eswatini | 1712 New Hampshire Avenue NW | Dupont Circle | | |
| Ethiopia | 3506 International Drive NW | North Cleveland Park | | |
| Fiji | 2000 M Street NW | Downtown | | |
| Finland | 3301 Massachusetts Avenue NW | Embassy Row | | |
| France | 4101 Reservoir Road NW | Georgetown | | |
| Gabon | 2034 20th Street NW | Adams Morgan | | |
| (The Gambia) Gambia | 5630 16th St NW | Sixteenth Street Heights | | |
| (Georgia (country)) Georgia | 1824 R Street NW | Dupont Circle | | |
| Germany | 4645 Reservoir Road NW | Colony Hill | | |
| Ghana | 3512 International Drive NW | North Cleveland Park | | |
| Greece | 2221 Massachusetts Avenue NW | Embassy Row | | |
| Grenada | 1701 New Hampshire Avenue NW | Dupont Circle | | |
| Guatemala | 2220 R Street NW | Embassy Row | | |
| Guinea | 2112 Leroy Place NW | Kalorama Heights | | |
| Guyana | 2490 Tracy Place NW | Kalorama Heights | | |
| Haiti | 2311 Massachusetts Avenue NW | Embassy Row | | |
| Holy See (Vatican City) | 3339 Massachusetts Avenue, NW | Embassy Row | | |
| Honduras | 1220 19th St, NW #320 | Dupont Circle | | |
| Hungary | 1500 Rhode Island Avenue, N.W. | Scott Circle | | |
| Iceland | 2900 K Street NW | Georgetown | | |
| India | 2107 Massachusetts Avenue NW | Embassy Row | | |
| Indonesia | 2020 Massachusetts Avenue NW | Embassy Row | | |
| Iraq | 1801 P Street NW | Dupont Circle | | |
| (Republic of Ireland) Ireland | 1700 Pennsylvania Avenue NW | Downtown | | |
| Israel | 3514 International Drive NW | North Cleveland Park | | |
| Italy | 3000 Whitehaven Street NW | Embassy Row | | |
| (Ivory Coast) vory Coast | 2424 Massachusetts Avenue NW | Embassy Row | | |
| Jamaica | 1520 New Hampshire Avenue NW | Dupont Circle | | |
| Japan | 2520 Massachusetts Avenue NW | Embassy Row | | |
| Jordan | 3504 International Drive NW | North Cleveland Park | | |
| Kazakhstan | 1401 16th Street NW | Dupont Circle | | |
| Kenya | 2249 R Street NW | Kalorama Heights | | |
| Kosovo | 3612 Massachusetts Ave NW | Kalorama Heights | | |
| Kuwait | 2940 Tilden Street NW | Forest Hills | | |
| Kyrgyzstan | 2360 Massachusetts Avenue NW | Embassy Row | | |
| Laos | 2222 S Street NW | Kalorama Heights | | |
| Latvia | 2306 Massachusetts Avenue NW | Embassy Row | | |
| Lebanon | 2560 28th Street NW | Woodley Park | | |
| Lesotho | 2511 Massachusetts Avenue NW | Embassy Row | | |
| Liberia | 5201 16th Street NW; 38.953421°N 77.036019°W | Sixteenth Street Heights | | |
| Libya | 1460 Dahlia Street NW | Shepherd Park | | |
| Liechtenstein | 2900 K Street NW | Georgetown | | |
| Lithuania | 2622 16th Street NW | Adams Morgan | | |
| Luxembourg | 2200 Massachusetts Avenue NW | Embassy Row | | |
| Madagascar | 2374 Massachusetts Avenue NW | Embassy Row | | |
| Malawi | 2408 Massachusetts Avenue NW | Embassy Row | | |
| Malaysia | 3516 International Court NW | North Cleveland Park | | |
| Mali | 2130 R Street NW | Kalorama Heights | | |
| Malta | 2017 Connecticut Avenue NW | Kalorama | | |
| Marshall Islands | 2433 Massachusetts Avenue NW | Embassy Row | | |
| Mauritania | 2129 Leroy Place NW | Kalorama Heights | | |
| Mauritius | 1709 N Street NW | Downtown | | |
| Mexico | 1911 Pennsylvania Avenue NW | Downtown | | |
| (Federated States of Micronesia) Micronesia | 1725 N Street NW | Dupont Circle | | |
| Moldova | 2101 S Street NW | Kalorama Heights | | |
| Monaco | 888 17th Street, NW | Farragut Square | | |
| Mongolia | 2833 M Street NW | Georgetown | | |
| Montenegro | 1610 New Hampshire Avenue NW | Dupont Circle | | |
| Morocco | 3508 International Drive NW | North Cleveland Park | | |
| Mozambique | 1525 New Hampshire Avenue NW | Dupont Circle | | |
| Myanmar | 2300 S Street NW | Kalorama Heights | | |
| Namibia | 1605 New Hampshire Avenue NW | Dupont Circle | | |
| Nepal | 2131 Leroy Place NW | Kalorama Heights | | |
| Netherlands | 4200 Linnean Avenue NW | Forest Hills | | |
| New Zealand | 37 Observatory Circle NW | Observatory Circle | | |
| Nicaragua | 1627 New Hampshire Avenue NW | Dupont Circle | | |
| Niger | 2204 R Street NW | Embassy Row | | |
| Nigeria | 3519 International Court NW | North Cleveland Park | | |
| North Macedonia | 2129 Wyoming Avenue NW | Kalorama Heights | | |
| Norway | 2720 34th Street NW | Embassy Row | | |
| Oman | 2535 Belmont Road NW | Kalorama Heights | | |
| Pakistan | 3517 International Court NW | North Cleveland Park | | |
| Palau | 1701 Pennsylvania Avenue NW | Downtown | | |
| Panama | 2862 McGill Terrace NW | Woodley Park | | |
| Papua New Guinea | 1779 Massachusetts Avenue NW | Embassy Row | | |
| Paraguay | 2209 Massachusetts Ave, NW | Embassy Row | | |
| Peru | 1700 Massachusetts Avenue NW | Embassy Row | | |
| Philippines | 1600 Massachusetts Avenue NW | Embassy Row | | |
| Poland | 2640 16th Street NW | Adams Morgan | | |
| Portugal | 2012 Massachusetts Avenue NW | Embassy Row | | |
| Qatar | 1530 P Street NW | Dupont Circle | | |
| Romania | 1607 23rd Street NW | Embassy Row | | |
| Russia | 2650 Wisconsin Avenue NW | Cathedral Heights | | |
| Rwanda | 1714 New Hampshire Avenue NW | Dupont Circle | | |
| Saint Kitts and Nevis | 1203 19th Street, NW | Dupont Circle | | |
| Saint Lucia | 1629 K Street, NW, Suite 1250 | Downtown | | |
| Saint Vincent and the Grenadines | 1629 K St NW, Suite 704 | Downtown | | |
| Saudi Arabia | 601 New Hampshire Avenue NW; Jamal Khashoggi Way | Foggy Bottom | | |
| Senegal | 2215 M St. NW | West End | | |
| Serbia | 1333 16th Street NW | Dupont Circle | | |
| Sierra Leone | 1701 19th Street NW | Dupont Circle | | |
| Singapore | 3501 International Place NW | North Cleveland Park | | |
| Slovakia | 3523 International Court NW | North Cleveland Park | | |
| Slovenia | 2410 California Street NW | Kalorama Heights | | |
| Somalia | 1609 22nd St NW | Dupont Circle | | |
| South Africa | 3051 Massachusetts Avenue NW | Embassy Row | | |
| South Korea | 2450 Massachusetts Avenue NW | Embassy Row | | |
| South Sudan | 1015 31st St NW, #300 | Georgetown | | |
| Spain | 2375 Pennsylvania Avenue NW | West End | | |
| Sri Lanka | 3025 Whitehaven Street NW | Kalorama Heights | | |
| Sudan | 2210 Massachusetts Avenue NW | Embassy Row | | |
| Suriname | 4201 Connecticut Avenue NW, Suite 400 | Forest Hills | | |
| Sweden | 2900 K Street NW | Georgetown | | |
| Switzerland | 2900 Cathedral Avenue NW | Woodley Park | | |
| Syria | 2215 Wyoming Avenue, NW | Kalorama Heights | | |
| Tajikistan | 1005 New Hampshire Avenue NW | West End | | |
| Tanzania | 1232 22nd St. NW | West End | | |
| Thailand | 1024 Wisconsin Ave NW | Georgetown | | |
| Timor-Leste | 1450 Dahlia Street, NW | Shepherd Park | | |
| Togo | 2208 Massachusetts Avenue NW | Embassy Row | | |
| Trinidad and Tobago | 1708 Massachusetts Avenue NW | Embassy Row | | |
| Tunisia | 1515 Massachusetts Avenue NW | Embassy Row | | |
| Turkey | 2525 Massachusetts Avenue NW | Embassy Row | | |
| Turkmenistan | 2207 Massachusetts Avenue NW | Embassy Row | | |
| Uganda | 5911 16th Street NW | Sixteenth Street Heights 38.961076°N 77.036015°W | | |
| Ukraine | 3350 M Street NW | Georgetown | | |
| United Arab Emirates | 3522 International Court NW | North Cleveland Park | | |
| United Kingdom | 3100 Massachusetts Avenue NW | Embassy Row | | |
| Uruguay | 1913 I Street NW | Foggy Bottom | | |
| Uzbekistan | 1746 Massachusetts Avenue NW | Embassy Row | | |
| Vietnam | 1233 20th Street NW | Dupont Circle | | |
| Yemen | 2319 Wyoming Avenue NW | Kalorama Heights | | |
| Zambia | 2419 Massachusetts Avenue NW | Embassy Row | | |
| Zimbabwe | 1608 New Hampshire Avenue NW | Dupont Circle | | |

== Other missions ==
| Country/Territory/Organization | Mission type | Location | Neighborhood | Image | Reference |
|---|---|---|---|---|---|
| Bermuda | Representative office | 325 7th Street NW, Suite 350 | Downtown | | |
| European Union | Delegation | 2175 K Street NW | Downtown | | |
| Hong Kong | Economic and Trade Office | 1520 18th Street NW | Dupont Circle | | |
| Iran | Interests Section | 1250 23rd Street NW, Suite 200 | West End | | |
| Quebec | Representative office | 805 15th Street NW, Suite 450 | Downtown | | |
| Republic of China (Taiwan) | Taipei Economic and Cultural Representative Office | 4201 Wisconsin Avenue NW | North Cleveland Park | | |

== Consular Sections and Consulates-General ==
| Country | Mission type | Location | Neighborhood | Image | Reference |
|---|---|---|---|---|---|
| Algeria | Consular Section | 2118 Kalorama Rd NW | Kalorama Heights | | |
| Angola | Consular Section | 2100 16th Street NW | U Street | | |
| Argentina | Consular Section | 1811 Q St NW, Washington, DC 20009 | Dupont Circle | | |
| Bolivia | Consulate-General | 718 Connecticut Ave. NW, 2nd Floor | Dupont Circle | | |
| Brazil | Consulate-General | 1030 15th Street NW | Downtown | | |
| Chile | Consular Section | 1736 Massachusetts Avenue, NW | Embassy Row | | |
| China | Consular Section | 2201 Wisconsin Avenue NW, Suite 110 | Observatory Circle | | |
| Cuba | Consular Section | 2639 16 Street NW | Columbia Heights | | |
| Greece | Consular Section | 2217 Massachusetts Avenue NW | Embassy Row | | |
| Honduras | Consulate-General | 1990 M Street NW | Downtown | | |
| India | Consular Section | 2536 Massachusetts Avenue | Embassy Row | | |
| Iraq | Consular Section | 3421 Massachusetts Avenue NW | Embassy Row | | |
| Mexico | Consular Section | 1250 23rd Street NW, Suite 002 | West End | | |
| Morocco | Consular Section | 1601 21st Street NW | Dupont Circle | | |
| Peru | Consulate-General | 1225 23rd Street NW | West End | | |
| Philippines | Consular Section | 1617 Massachusetts Avenue NW | Embassy Row | | |
| Poland | Consular Section | 2224 Wyoming Avenue N.W | Kalorama Heights | | |
| South Korea | Consulate-General | 2320 Massachusetts Avenue NW | Embassy Row | | |
| Thailand | Consular section | 2300 Kalorama Road, NW | Kalorama Heights | | |

== See also ==
- Foreign policy of the United States
- List of diplomatic missions of the United States
- List of diplomatic missions in the United States
