= Embassy Row =

Section of Washington, DC

Coordinates: 38.9157204°N 77.0708922°W

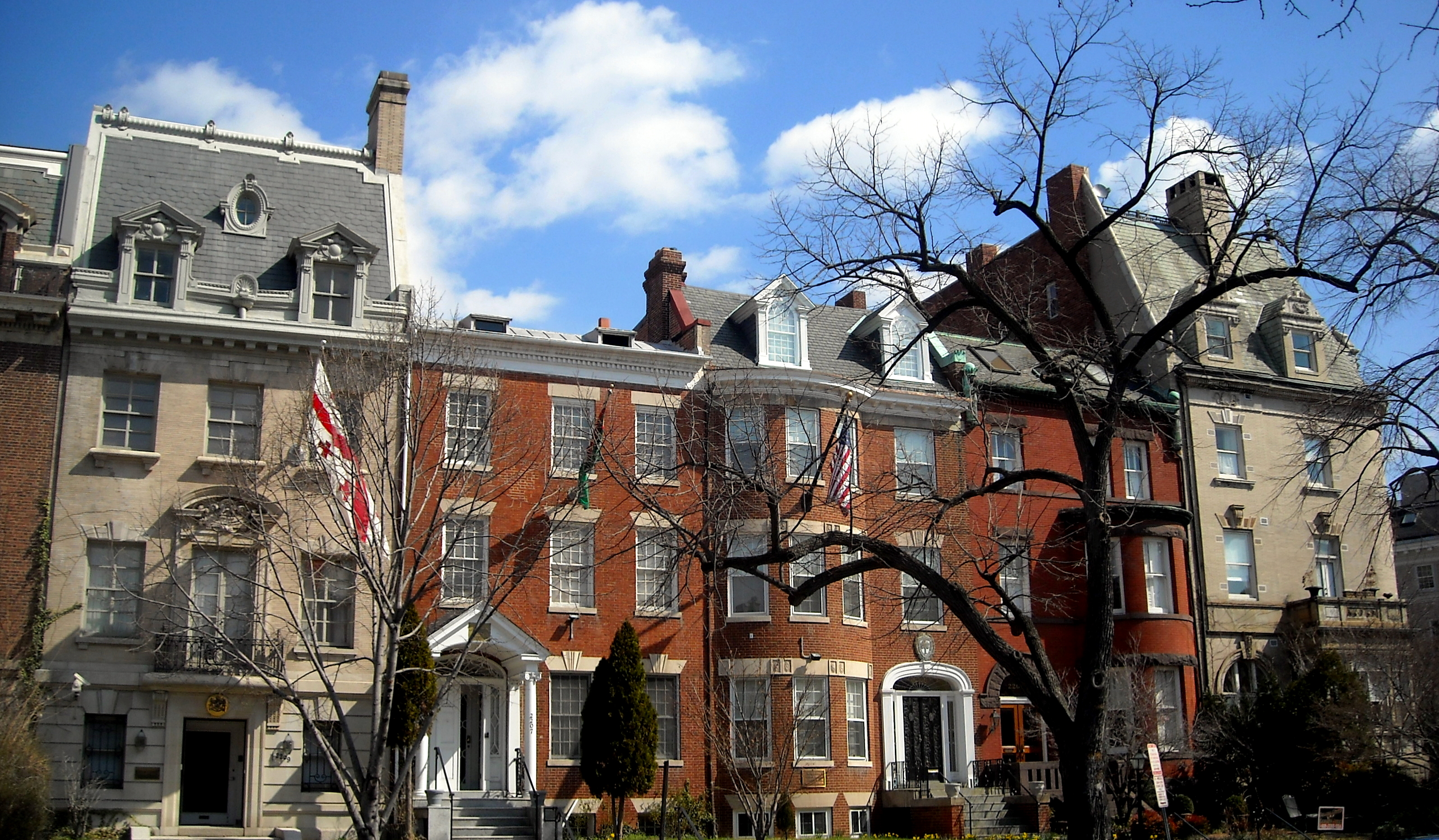
Private residences and embassies located on Massachusetts Avenue between 22nd Street and Sheridan Circle

Embassy Row is the informal name for a section of Northwest Washington, D.C., with a high concentration of embassies, diplomatic missions, and diplomatic residences. It spans Massachusetts Avenue N.W. between 18th and 35th street, bounded by Scott Circle to the south and the United States Naval Observatory to the north; the term is often applied to nearby streets and neighborhoods that also host diplomatic buildings, such as Kalorama.

Of the 182 diplomatic missions in the city, the majority are located on or near Embassy Row, including those of Italy, Australia, India, Greece, Egypt, Ireland, Japan, and the United Kingdom. Due to the large number of well-preserved Gilded Age estates and townhouses, many of which house diplomatic missions or dignitaries, Embassy Row has been protected as part of the Massachusetts Avenue Historic District. Its historic and multicultural character has also made the area a center of tourism and local cultural life.

== History ==
Considered Washington's premier residential address in the late 19th and early 20th centuries, Massachusetts Avenue became known for its numerous mansions housing the city's social and political elites. Consequently, the segment between Scott Circle and Sheridan Circle gained the nickname "Millionaires' Row".

The Great Depression of 1929 led many to sell their homes; the often illustrious and expansive estates were well-suited for housing diplomatic missions as well as lodges of social clubs, giving Embassy Row its present name and identity. The relocation to Embassy Row of diplomatic representations, many of which had been established in Meridian Hill in previous decades, was further catalyzed by the construction of the British Embassy, commissioned in 1925 and completed in 1930, and the Japanese Embassy, built in 1931. The greatest number of embassies and chanceries moved to Embassy Row and the neighboring Kalorama neighborhood in the 1940s and early 1950s.

On the southeastern section of the row, between Scott Circle and Dupont Circle, many individual houses and mansions were replaced by larger office or apartment buildings between the 1930s and the 1970s. More recently, several prominent think tanks have clustered in that area, which has occasionally been referred to as Think Tank Row.

Many of Embassy Row's diplomatic buildings open to the public once a year in May, an initiative nicknamed Passport DC. This event was started in 2007 by the embassies of member states of the European Union, and extended in 2008 to other countries around the world under coordination by Cultural Tourism DC. Within this program, the EU embassies still open on a separate day, labelled EU Open House. A separate program, the Embassy Series, started in 1994 and coordinates concerts organized in the embassy buildings.

Embassy Row is protected as the Massachusetts Avenue Historic District, created in 1974 following controversy about the demolition of historic townhouses on 1722-28 Massachusetts Ave NW. Many of its notable buildings are listed in the DC Inventory of Historic Sites. Because few historic buildings remain on Scott Circle, the eastern boundary of the Historic District was set on 17th Street NW, but, since three embassies are located there and none farther east, Scott Circle is included in this article's definition of Embassy Row. The Western boundary used here is identical to that of the Historic District, namely Observatory Circle. However, some (e.g. real estate professionals) describe Embassy Row as extending as far west as Wisconsin Avenue NW.

== From Scott Circle to Sheridan Circle ==
This section of Massachusetts Avenue was the one known as the "Millionaires' Row" of Washington, D.C., in the late 19th and early 20th century.

North Side

- 1499 Massachusetts Ave NW: Post Massachusetts Avenue apartment building (arch. Esocoff & Associates, 2002)
- 1515 Massachusetts Ave NW: American Association for the Advancement of Science building (arch. Faulkner, Fryer and Vanderpool, 1956), now Embassy of Tunisia
- 1500 Rhode Island Ave NW: Brodhead-Bell-Morton Mansion, now the Embassy of Hungary (arch. John Fraser, 1879; remodeled by John Russell Pope, 1912)
- 1 Scott Circle NW: General Scott Apartments (arch. Robert O. Sholz, 1942)
- 1601 Massachusetts Ave NW: Embassy of Australia (arch. Bates, Smart & McCutcheon, 1965)
- 1617 Massachusetts Ave NW: Daniel C. Stapleton House (arch. Clarke Waggaman, 1917), now annex of the Embassy of the Philippines
- 1619 Massachusetts Ave NW: Forest Industries building (arch. Keyes, Lesbridge & Condon, 1961), now Benjamin T. Rome Building of Johns Hopkins University
- 1625 Massachusetts Ave NW: Airline Pilots Association building (arch. Vlastimil Koubek, 1972), now also Washington campus of Johns Hopkins Carey Business School
- 1701 Massachusetts Ave NW: The Bay State apartment building (arch. Robert O. Sholz, 1939)
- 1711 Massachusetts Ave NW: Boston House apartment building (arch. Berla & Abel, 1950)
- 1717 Massachusetts Ave NW: Bernstein-Offit building of Johns Hopkins University; the upper two floors used to host the embassy of the German Democratic Republic (arch. Cooper & Auerback, 1964)
- 1727 Massachusetts Ave NW: The Winthrop apartment building (arch. Alvin L. Aubinoe, 1940)
- 1775 Massachusetts Ave NW: Brookings Institution main building (arch. Faulkner, Kingsbury & Stenhouse, 1960)
- 1779 Massachusetts Ave NW: Carnegie Endowment for International Peace (arch. Smith, Hinchman & Gryll, 1989), also hosting the Embassy of Papua New Guinea
- 1789 Massachusetts Ave NW (numbered 1785 until 2016): McCormick Apartments (arch. Jules Henri de Sibour, 1917), now American Enterprise Institute
- 1801 Massachusetts Ave NW: Herbert Wadsworth House (arch. George Cary, 1902), now the Sulgrave Club
- 15 Dupont Circle NW: Robert W. Patterson House (arch. Stanford White, 1902), now Ampeer Dupont Circle apartments
- 11 Dupont Circle NW: office building (1974), home of the Peterson Institute for International Economics until 2001
- 1500 New Hampshire Ave NW: Dupont Circle Hotel (1950)
- 1501 Connecticut Ave NW: commercial building (1923), now Starbucks Coffee
- 1913 Massachusetts Ave NW: Dupont Circle Branch of the Riggs National Bank (arch. George Nicholas Ray, 1923), now PNC
- 2001 Massachusetts Ave NW: apartment house (arch. Gertrude Sawyer, 1935), now Kossuth House of the Hungarian Reformed Federation of America (1935)
- 2007 Massachusetts Ave NW: Horace A. Taylor House (arch. George Oakley Totten Jr., 1901)
- 2009 Massachusetts Ave NW: Hershell Main House, later Alice Roosevelt Longworth house (built 1881, front rebuilt 1910), now the Washington Legal Foundation
- 2015 Massachusetts Ave NW: Embassy Row Hotel, rebranded The Ven Embassy Row in late 2020 (arch. Fischer and Elmore, 1971)
- 2025 Massachusetts Ave NW: Samuel M. Bryan House (arch. W. Bruce Gray, 1885), now the Urban Alliance Foundation
- 2027 Massachusetts Ave NW: House (1911), now the Religious Action Center of Reform Judaism
- 1600 21st Street NW: D. Clinch Phillips House (arch. Hornblower & Marshall, 1897), now the Phillips Collection
- 2107 Massachusetts Ave NW: T. Morris Murray House (1901), now Embassy of India
- 2121 Massachusetts Ave NW: Richard T. Townsend House (arch. Carrère and Hastings, 1901), now the Cosmos Club
- 2131 Massachusetts Ave NW: George W. Barrie House (arch. Marsh & Peter, 1905), now Embassy of Estonia
- 2201 Massachusetts Ave NW: Frederick A. Miller House (arch. Paul J. Pelz, 1901)
- 2203 Massachusetts Ave NW: Emeline D. Lovett House (arch. Alexander Millar, 1890)
- 2205 Massachusetts Ave NW: Anna Jenness-Miller House (arch. Waddy Wood, 1920), now the National Society Daughters of the American Colonists
- 2207 Massachusetts Ave NW: townhouse (arch. Louis D. Meline, 1902), now Embassy of Turkmenistan
- 2209 Massachusetts Ave NW: townhouse (arch. Wyeth & Cresson, 1911), now Embassy of Paraguay
- 2211 Massachusetts Ave NW: Irene Rucker Sheridan House (arch. Wood, Donn & Deming, 1904)
- 2217 Massachusetts Ave NW: Embassy of Greece (arch. Angelos Demetriou, 2006)
- 2221 Massachusetts Ave NW: Hennen Jennings House (arch. George Oakley Totten Jr., 1906), now residence of the Ambassador of Greece

South Side

- 1500 Massachusetts Ave NW: 1500 Massachusetts apartment building (1952)
- 1616 Rhode Island Ave NW: Center for Strategic and International Studies (arch. Hickok Cole, 2013)
- 1600 Massachusetts Ave NW: Embassy of the Philippines (1993)
- 1700 Massachusetts Ave NW: Emily J. Wilkins House (arch. Jules Henri de Sibour, 1909), now Embassy of Peru
- 1708 Massachusetts Ave NW: Henry C. Nevins House (arch. Harvey L. Page, 1891), now Embassy of Trinidad and Tobago
- 1720 Massachusetts Ave NW: town house, now Stephanie Tubbs Jones building of the Congressional Black Caucus Foundation
- 1724 Massachusetts Ave NW: Embassy of Colombia (1981)
- 1732 Massachusetts Ave NW: J.C. McGuire House (arch. Glenn Brown, 1889), now Embassy of Chile
- 1736 Massachusetts Ave NW: now Consular section of the Embassy of Chile
- 1740 Massachusetts Ave NW: Paul H. Nitze School of Advanced International Studies (1962)
- 1746 Massachusetts Ave NW: Clarence Moore House (arch. Jules Henri de Sibour, 1909), now Embassy of Uzbekistan
- 1750 Massachusetts Ave NW: Peterson Institute for International Economics (arch. James von Klemperer for Kohn Pedersen Fox, 2001)
- 1776 Massachusetts Ave NW: office building (1969)
- 1780 Massachusetts Ave NW: Ingalls House (arch. Jules Henri de Sibour, 1912), now office of the President of the Brookings Institution
- 1800 Massachusetts Ave NW: office building (1979), now the Service Employees International Union
- 1369 Connecticut Ave NW: U.S. Trust Company building (arch. Jules Henri de Sibour, 1912), now SunTrust branch
- 1350 Connecticut Ave NW: Dupont Circle Building (arch. Mihran Mesrobian, 1931)
- 21 Dupont Circle NW: Euram Building (arch. Hartman-Cox, 1972)
- 1 Dupont Circle NW: office building (arch. Vlastimil Koubek, 1968), now the American Council on Education
- 2000 P Street NW: The Toronto apartment building (arch. Albert H. Beers, 1908)
- 2000 Massachusetts Ave NW: James G. Blaine Mansion (arch. George Fraser, 1881), now Phillips & Cohen LLP
- 2012 Massachusetts Ave NW: Joseph Beale House (arch. Glenn Brown, 1897), now Embassy of Portugal
- 2020 Massachusetts Ave NW: Walsh-McLean House (arch. Henry Andersen, 1903), now Embassy of Indonesia
- 2100 Massachusetts Ave NW: Fairfax Hotel (arch. B. Stanley Simmons, 1927)
- 2118 Massachusetts Ave NW: Larz Anderson House (arch. Arthur Little & Herbert W. C. Browne, 1905), now Society of the Cincinnati
- 2122 Massachusetts Ave NW: State House apartment building (arch. Matthew G. Lepley, 1951)
- 2200 Massachusetts Ave NW: Alexander Stewart House (arch. Jules Henri de Sibour, 1909), now Embassy of Luxembourg
- 2202 Massachusetts Ave NW: townhouse (1914), now office of the Defense Attaché of the Embassy of Turkey
- 2208 Massachusetts Ave NW: townhouse (arch. Louis D. Meline, 1900), now Embassy of Togo
- 2210 Massachusetts Ave NW: townhouse (arch. Louis D. Meline, 1901), now Embassy of Sudan
- 2212 Massachusetts Ave NW: townhouse (arch. Louis D. Meline, 1898)
- 2214-16 Massachusetts Ave NW: twin townhouses (arch. George Nicholas Ray, 1931)
- 2220 Massachusetts Ave NW: townhouse (arch. George Nicholas Ray, 1914), now Embassy of the Bahamas
- 2228 Massachusetts Ave NW: townhouse (arch. George Oakley Totten Jr. & Laussat Roger, 1903), now office of the Defense and Military Attaché of the Embassy of Greece
- 2230 Massachusetts Ave NW: James C. Hooe House (arch. George Oakley Totten Jr., 1907)
- 2232 Massachusetts Ave NW: townhouse (1900), now Economic and Commercial Bureau of the Embassy of Egypt
- 2234 Massachusetts Ave NW: Henrietta M. Halliday House (arch. William Penn Cresson), 1908), now Embassy of Ireland
- 1607 23rd St NW: Frank Ellis House (arch. Carrère and Hastings, 1907), now Embassy of Romania

== From Sheridan Circle to Observatory Circle ==
North Side

- 2223 Massachusetts Ave NW: American Society of International Law (arch. George Oakley Totten Jr., 1907)
- 2225 R St NW: Embassy of Armenia
- 2249 R St NW: C. Peyton Russell House (arch. Nathan C. Wyeth, 1908), now Embassy of Kenya
- 2251 R St NW: Frederick A. Keep House (arch. Nathan C. Wyeth, 1906), now residence of the Ambassador of Vietnam
- 2253 R St NW: Charles L. Fitzhugh House (arch. Waddy Wood, 1904), now residence of the Ambassador of the Philippines
- 2301 Massachusetts Ave NW: Joseph Beale House (arch. Glenn Brown, 1909), now residence of the Ambassador of Egypt
- 2305 Massachusetts Ave NW: Sarah S. Wyeth House (arch. Nathan C. Wyeth, 1909), now residence of the Ambassador of Chile
- 2311 Massachusetts Ave NW: Gibson Fahnestock House (arch. Nathan C. Wyeth, 1910), embassy of the Republic of China from 1952 to 1978, now Embassy of Haiti
- 2315 Massachusetts Ave NW: Francis B. Moran House (arch. George Oakley Totten Jr., 1909), formerly embassy of Persia/Iran (1935–43) then embassy of Pakistan (1951–2011)
- 2339 Massachusetts Ave NW: Wendell Mansions apartment building (arch. Edward Hughes Glidden, 1906)
- 2343 Massachusetts Ave NW: Former chancery of the embassy of Austria (arch. George Nicholas Ray, 1930), now Embassy of Croatia
- 2349 Massachusetts Ave NW: Christian Hauge House (arch. George Oakley Totten Jr., 1906), later embassy of Czechoslovakia (1929–72) and now Embassy of Cameroon
- 2347 S Street NW: Owsley House (arch. Ward Brown, 1929), now residence of the Ambassador of the Netherlands
- 2401 Massachusetts Ave NW: Former chancery of the Embassy of Malaysia (1969), now Embassy of Chad
- 2419 Massachusetts Ave NW: Louis Arthur Coolidge House (arch. William Penn Cresson & Nathan C. Wyeth, 1906), now Embassy of Zambia
- 2433 Massachusetts Ave NW: Harry Wardman House (arch. Mihran Mesrobian, 1934), now Embassy of the Marshall Islands
- 2443 Massachusetts Ave NW: Residence of the Ambassador of Venezuela (arch. Chester A. Patterson, 1939)
- 2501 Massachusetts Ave NW: C.H. Harlow House (arch. Waddy Wood, 1916), later home of Robert A. Taft
- 2511 Massachusetts Ave NW: house (1942), now Embassy of Lesotho
- 2525 Massachusetts Ave NW: Embassy of Turkey (arch. Shalom Baranes Associates, 1999)
- 2535 Massachusetts Ave NW: house (1953), now Embassy of Belize
- 2551 Massachusetts Ave NW: Islamic Center of Washington (arch. Mario Rossi in association with Irwin S. Porter & Sons, 1957)
- 2929 Massachusetts Ave NW: Maie H. Williams House (arch. Clarke Waggaman, 1918)
- 3003 Massachusetts Ave NW: Alanson B. Houghton House (arch. Frederick H. Brooke, 1935), former residence of the Ambassador of Iran
- 3005 Massachusetts Ave NW: former Embassy of Iran (1959)
- 3051 Massachusetts Ave NW: Embassy of South Africa (1936, expanded 1964)
- 3301 Massachusetts Ave NW: Embassy of Finland (arch. Mikko Heikkinen and Markku Komonen, 1994)
- 3339 Massachusetts Ave NW: Embassy of the Holy See (arch. Frederick V. Murphy, 1938)
- 3401 Massachusetts Ave NW: Residence of the Ambassador of Norway (arch. John J. Whelan, 1931)
- 3415 Massachusetts Ave NW: Joseph W. Babcock House (arch. Arthur B. Heaton, 1912), now Embassy of Cape Verde and Embassy of Timor-Leste
- 3417 Massachusetts Ave NW: Soka Gakkai International-USA Buddhist Center (arch. William Hellmuth, 2008)
- 3421 Massachusetts Ave NW: house (1927), now Embassy of Iraq

South Side

- 1606 23rd St NW: Edward H. Everett House (arch. George Oakley Totten Jr., 1914), now residence of the Ambassador of Turkey
- 2304 Massachusetts Ave NW: house (arch. Louis D. Meline, 1901), now part of the Embassy of Latvia
- 2306 Massachusetts Ave NW: Alice Pike Barney House (arch. Waddy Wood, 1902), now Embassy of Latvia
- 2320 Massachusetts Ave NW: detached house (arch. Frank Russell White, 1918), now Consular section of the Embassy of South Korea
- 2324 Massachusetts Ave NW: town house (arch. Louis D. Meline, 1902), now annex of the Embassy of Greece
- 2328 Massachusetts Ave NW: town house (arch. Donn and Deming, 1922)
- 2332-38 Massachusetts Ave NW: row of four townhouses (arch. Nicholas T. Haller, 1899)
- 2340 Massachusetts Ave NW: townhouse (1914), now Embassy of Burkina Faso
- 2344 Massachusetts Ave NW: George Wallace William Hanger House (arch. William James Palmer, 1907)
- 2346 Massachusetts Ave NW: George Cabot Lodge House (arch. Wood, Donn & Deming, 1905)
- 2360 Massachusetts Ave NW: townhouse (arch. William James Palmer, 1911), now Embassy of Kyrgyzstan
- 2370 Massachusetts Ave NW: Alice W.B. Stanley House (arch. Smith & Edwards, 1930), now Korean Cultural Center
- 2374 Massachusetts Ave NW: townhouse (1921), now Embassy of Madagascar
- 2406 Massachusetts Ave NW: Nellie and Isabelle Sedgeley House (arch. Nathan C. Wyeth, 1911), now Cultural Office of the Embassy of the UAE
- 2408 Massachusetts Ave NW: Granville Roland Fortescue House (arch. Nathan C. Wyeth, 1911), now Embassy of Malawi
- 2412: Frederick Atherton House (arch. Nathan C. Wyeth and Francis P. Sullivan, 1930)
- 2424 Massachusetts Ave NW: Embassy of Cote d'Ivoire (arch. Wanchul Lee, 2004)
- 2432 Massachusetts Ave NW: house (1951), now residence of the Ambassador of Algeria
- 2440 Massachusetts Ave NW: Charles Mason Remey House (arch. Smith & Edwards, c. 1930), now Permanent mission of Mexico to the OAS
- 2450 Massachusetts Ave NW: Embassy of South Korea (arch. Marani & Morris, Faulkner, Kingsbury and Stenhouse, 1953)
- 2500 Massachusetts Ave NW: apartment house (arch. Louis E. Sholtes, 1922)
- 2516 Massachusetts Ave NW: Old Ambassador's Residence of the Embassy of Japan (arch. Delano & Aldrich, 1931)
- 2520 Massachusetts Ave NW: Chancery of the Embassy of Japan (arch. Robert B. Anderson, 1986)
- 2536 Massachusetts Ave NW: Chancery Annex of the Embassy of India (1954)
- 2540 Massachusetts Ave NW: The Army and Navy apartment house (arch. Harry L. Edwards, 1925)
- 2558 Massachusetts Ave NW: Spanish Mission to the Organization of American States (1926)
- 3000 Whitehaven St NW: Embassy of Italy (arch. Piero Sartogo, 2000)
- 3025 Whitehaven St NW: Embassy of Sri Lanka
- 3200 Whitehaven St NW: Embassy of Denmark (1960)
- 3000 Massachusetts Ave NW: Robert S. McCormick House (arch. John Russell Pope, 1928), now residence of the Ambassador of Brazil
- 3006 Massachusetts Ave NW: Embassy of Brazil (arch. Olavo Redig de Campos, 1971)
- 3014 Massachusetts Ave NW: house (1941), now Embassy of Bolivia
- 3100 Massachusetts Ave NW: Embassy of the United Kingdom (arch. Edwin Lutyens, 1931); chancery building (arch. Eric Bedford) added in the late 1950s.
- 3450 Massachusetts Ave NW: United States Naval Observatory

== Statuary ==
The monumental setting of the Row has favored the erection of many memorials and statues. They are erected either on private grounds, many of them by the embassies to showcase a prominent national figure, or on public (federal) land following an Act of Congress, including the successive Circles and several triangular parks created by the intersections between the diagonal avenue and the L'Enfant Plan grid. A special case is the statue of Winston Churchill, which has one foot on the grounds of the British Embassy and the other on federal land to symbolize the UK-US alliance.

- Samuel Hahnemann Monument on the eastern side of Scott Circle, by Charles Henry Niehaus (1900)
- Equestrian statue of Winfield Scott, by Henry Kirke Brown (1874)
- the Daniel Webster Memorial, by Gaetano Trentanove (1900)
- a modern bust of Miguel Grau in front of the Embassy of Peru (2011)
- a bust of Bernardo O'Higgins by Galvarino Ponce Morel, in front of the Embassy of Chile (2009)
- the Dupont Circle Fountain, by Daniel Chester French (1920)
- a statue of Hindu goddess Saraswati by a Balinese sculpting team, on the grounds of the Indonesian Embassy, with a group of three children including a young Barack Obama in front (2013)
- the Mahatma Gandhi Memorial by Gautam Pal, in front of the Indian Embassy (2000)
- a bronze cast of George Washington by Jean-Antoine Houdon, in front of the Society of the Cincinnati (2008). (This statue was moved away in June 2020.)
- the statue of Tomas Masaryk, by Vincenc Makovský (1937, cast 1968, erected 2002)
- a copy in reduced size of the 1969 bronze statue of Eleftherios Venizelos by Yannis Pappas, now in Freedom Park in Athens, erected in front of the Greek Embassy (2009)
- the statue of Mustafa Kemal Atatürk by Jeffery L. Hall, in front of the Turkish Ambassador's residence (2013)
- Equestrian statue of Philip Sheridan, by Gutzon Borglum (1908)
- the statue of Philip Jaisohn in front of the South Korean Consular Section, by Jae-kil Lee (2008)
- a bust of Orlando Letelier commemorating his assassination, by Barry Woods Johnston, in front of the residence of the Ambassador of Chile (2018)
- the statue of St Jerome by Ivan Meštrović, in front of the Croatian Embassy (1954, relocated c. 1998)
- a cast of Allow Me by Seward Johnson, in front of the house on 2346 Massachusetts Ave NW (1984)
- the statue of Robert Emmet, by Jerome Connor (1916, relocated 1966)
- an abstract sculpture by Dong-koo Yun in front of the Korean Embassy (2000)
- another statue of Mustafa Kemal Atatürk, this one cast in fiberglass by Ragıp Çiçen, donated by İbrahim Fırtına and standing inside the Turkish Embassy (2004)
- the statue of Winston Churchill by William McVey, in front of the British Embassy (1966)
- the statue of Nelson Mandela by Jean Doyle, in front of the South African Embassy (2013)
- the monument to Khalil Gibran, by Gordon S. Kray (1991)
- the statue of Crown Princess Martha Louise of Norway by Kirsten Kokkin, in front of the Norwegian Embassy (2005)

== Other embassies in Washington, D.C. ==
In the immediate vicinity of Embassy Row, many other embassies and diplomatic residences are located within one or two blocks of Massachusetts Avenue on cross streets, particularly R, S, and 22nd Streets NW near Sheridan Circle, and in the Kalorama neighborhood north of Embassy Row. The section of New Hampshire Avenue NW north of Dupont Circle alone is home to the embassies of Argentina, Belarus, Botswana, the Democratic Republic of the Congo, Eritrea, Eswatini, Grenada, Jamaica, Montenegro, Mozambique, Namibia, Nicaragua, Rwanda, and Zimbabwe.

In the early days of Washington, D.C., most diplomats and ambassadors lived on or around Lafayette Square. The first purpose-designed embassy building in Washington was the embassy of the United Kingdom on 1300 Connecticut Avenue, immediately south of Embassy Row, built in 1872 by Sir Edward Thornton on John Fraser's design, and demolished in 1931. Thornton's choice of location, at a time when Dupont Circle was still almost entirely undeveloped, may be considered the origin of Embassy Row as a diplomatic neighborhood.

In the first three decades of the 20th century, several European legations gathered farther northeast, on a section of 16th Street near Meridian Hill Park. This area was specifically developed by local resident Mary Foote Henderson to attract embassies, and she even aimed at having the residences of the U.S. president and vice-president relocated there. However, the neighborhood was hit hard by the Great Depression, and Embassy Row became a comparatively more attractive location for diplomats in the following decade. Former embassy buildings in the Meridian Hill area include those of France (arch. George Oakley Totten Jr., 1907, now the Council for Professional Recognition); Mexico (arch. Nathan C. Wyeth, 1911, now the Mexican Cultural Institute); the Netherlands (arch. George Oakley Totten Jr., 1922, now the Embassy of Ecuador); Spain (arch. George Oakley Totten Jr., 1923 and addition by Jules Henri de Sibour, 1927; now the Spain-USA Foundation); Egypt (arch. George Oakley Totten Jr., 1924, now Meridian Hall); Italy (arch. Warren and Wetmore, 1925, currently under redevelopment); and Brazil (arch. George Oakley Totten Jr., 1927, later embassy of Hungary and now the Josephine Butler Parks Center). The embassies of Cuba (arch. Macneil & Macneil, 1918), Lithuania (arch. George Oakley Totten Jr., 1909), and Poland (arch. George Oakley Totten Jr., 1910) are still located in the Meridian Hill neighborhood. A bit further up 16th Street, the Embassy Building No. 10, built in the late 1920s, never actually served as an embassy despite being designed as one.

A high-security enclave in Van Ness, one mile north of the Naval Observatory on the federally owned former grounds of the National Bureau of Standards in Cleveland Park, was developed from 1968 as the International Chancery Center. It is home to the embassies of Austria, Bahrain, Bangladesh, Brunei, China, Egypt, Ethiopia, Ghana, Israel, Jordan, Kuwait, Malaysia, Morocco, Monaco, Nigeria, Pakistan, Singapore, Slovakia, and the United Arab Emirates.

A number of other embassies are scattered south of Massachusetts Avenue and closer to the National Mall, notably those of Canada, Mexico, Spain, Saudi Arabia, and the European Union. Still others are located in or around Georgetown, such as those of France, Germany, Russia, Sweden, Thailand, Ukraine, and Venezuela. The Caribbean Chancery on 3216 New Mexico Avenue NW hosts the embassies of four English-speaking Caribbean nations.

== See also ==
- Charles Carroll Glover
- List of diplomatic missions in Washington, D.C.
