= Statue of Winston Churchill (Washington, D.C.) =

Statue by William M. McVey in Washington, D.C., U.S.

- Statue of Winston Churchill
- Artist: William M. McVey (sculptor); George F. Dalton and Associates (architect); Fred Toguchi Associates (architect)
- Year: 1966
- Type: Bronze
- Dimensions: 210 cm × 110 cm × 180 cm (84 in × 42 in × 72 in)
- Location: Embassy of the United Kingdom Washington, D.C., United States; 38°55.189′N 77°03.690′W
- Owner: English Speaking Union

The statue of Winston Churchill on Embassy Row in Washington, D.C., is a bronze memorial in honor of British Prime Minister Winston Churchill. The plan to erect a memorial began after Churchill's 89th birthday. The English-Speaking Union (ESU) was the driving force behind the fundraising and installation of the statue. Eight sculptors submitted designs for the statue and the person chosen was William M. McVey. The architectural firms for the site were George F. Dalton and Associates and Fred Toguchi Associates.

There was a delay in finishing the statue due to opposition from some ESU members that the statue included Churchill holding a cigar. After a vote took place, it was decided to keep the cigar. The statue is placed so that one foot is on the Embassy of the United Kingdom's soil, and the other foot is on American soil. The unveiling and dedication took place on April 9, 1966, with notable attendees including Secretary of State Dean Rusk, Supreme Court Justice Earl Warren, and Churchill's son, Randolph.

== History ==
=== Memorial plans ===
Businessman Alexander Liggett brought up the idea of erecting a statue of Winston Churchill, as a way to demonstrate the Special Relationship between the U.S. and the U.K. On Churchill's 89th birthday, the English-Speaking Union (ESU) announced the organization would be erecting a statue in his honor. Plans for the memorial, with considerable input from American Kay Halle, included a two-country design to demonstrate Churchill's ancestry and closeness with the U.S. Eight sculptors submitted designs for the statue. The sculptor chosen, William M. McVey, had created a 5 in (13 cm) soft clay model for his design. It was stolen during a political gathering at a hotel and was never recovered.

McVey began working on the statue in 1964, while teaching at Ohio State University (OSU), and sculpted it in one of the university's labs. He took a leave of absence from being the director of sculpture at the Cleveland Institute of Art to teach at OSU and sculpt Churchill's statue. There was considerable debate about the inclusion of a cigar in the statue. After a vote by the ESU, it was decided to keep the cigar. An article from The New York Times said "Critics had contended it would be undignified. Cigar proponents argued a cigarless Churchill would not be an authentic Churchill." According to McVey, there were only 22 out of 300 photos of Churchill he looked at that did not include a cigar. The architectural firms chosen to design the site were George F. Dalton and Associates and Fred Toguchi Associates.

=== Dedication ===
The unveiling and dedication ceremony for the statue took place on April 9, 1966. U.S. Secretary of State Dean Rusk was the one chosen to unveil the statue while the United States Marine Band played Battle Hymn of the Republic, a song loved by Churchill. Amongst other attendees were U.S. Supreme Court Justice Earl Warren, General Lauris Norstad, British Ambassador Patrick Dean, and Churchill's son Randolph. The ceremony took place three years to the date since Churchill received his honorary citizenship of the United States. Before Churchill died in 1965, he was shown the plans for the statue and wrote a letter expressing his support and thankfulness. Speakers at the event included Rusk and Churchill's son. Rusk read a letter from U.S. President Lyndon B. Johnson which said he was issuing a proclamation that every April 9th should be known as Churchill Day.

=== Later history ===
When McVey died in 1995, it was noted in The New York Times the statue of Churchill was his best work. Churchill's statue has stood across the street from the statue of Nelson Mandela since 2013, when the latter was dedicated in front of the Embassy of South Africa. In 2023, during the Russo-Ukrainian War, two supporters of Ukraine started tying yellow and blue balloons to statues in Washington, D.C. The Churchill statue was one of many the two decorated with the balloons.

== Location and design ==
The Churchill statue stands in front of the Embassy of the United Kingdom in Washington, D.C. The embassy is located at 3100 Massachusetts Avenue NW on Embassy Row. The straddling placement of the statue, one foot on the embassy's land and one foot on American land, was designed on purpose. Its placement demonstrates Churchill being born to an American mother., in addition to him receiving honorary citizenship of the United States.

The bronze statue of Churchill is 9 ft (2.7 m) tall, resting on a granite pedestal that is 1.5 ft (0.46 m) tall. He is depicted walking while his right hand gives the V sign and his left hand is holding the top of his cane. His left hand is also holding a cigar. He is dressed wearing a suit with a bowtie and vest. Beneath the statue is a time capsule to be opened in 2063, the 100-year anniversary of Churchill receiving his honorary U.S. citizenship. Underneath the base is soil from Blenheim Palace, Chartwell, and New York City, his childhood home, his home as an adult, and his mother's home in Brooklyn, respectively.
