= Embassy of Iraq, Washington, D.C. =

Diplomatic mission to the United States

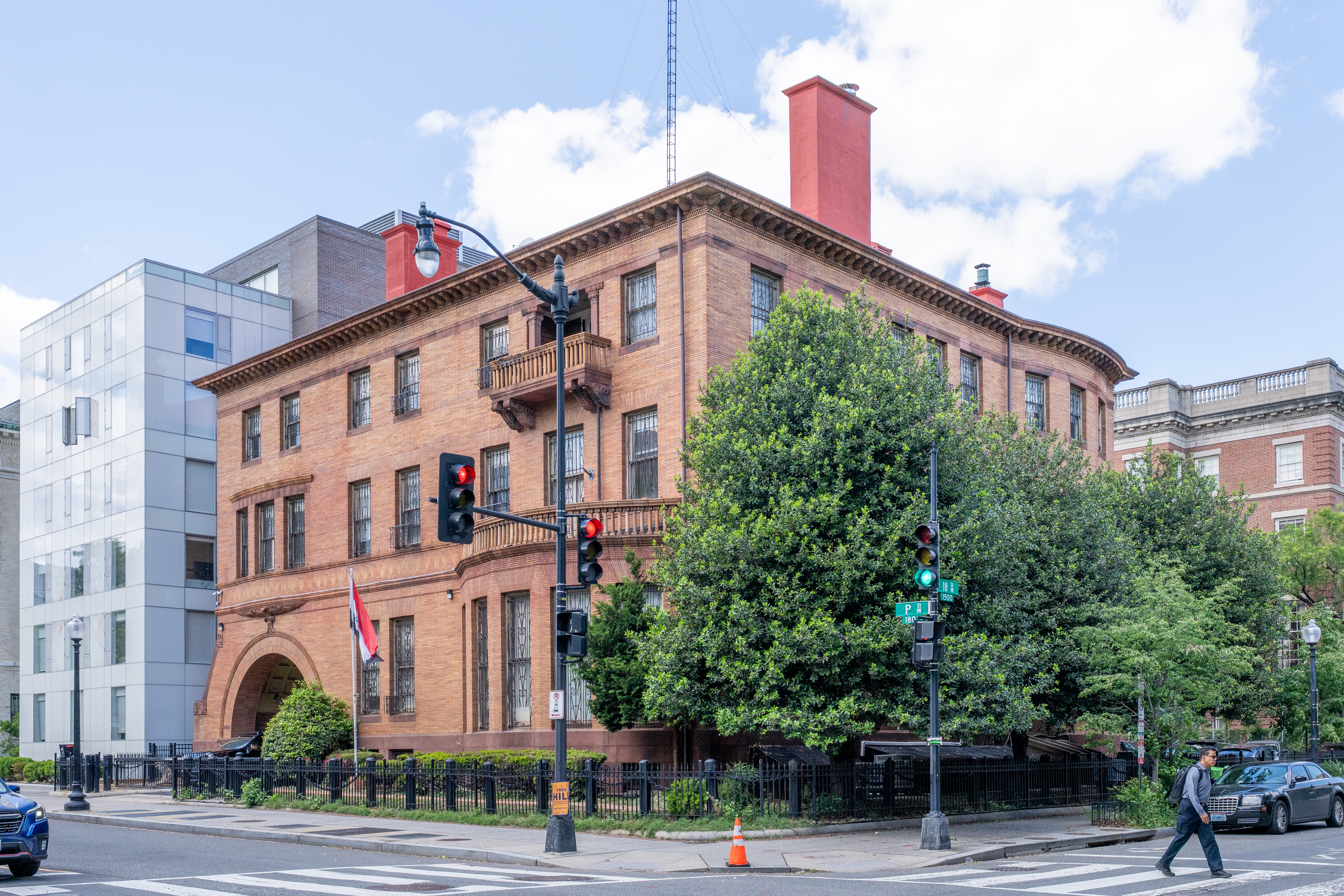
- The chancery, or main diplomatic building, in Dupont Circle
- Location: Washington, D.C.
- Address: 1801 P Street, N.W.
- Coordinates: 38°55′30.58″N 77°4′6.47″W

The Embassy of Iraq in Washington, D.C. is the diplomatic mission of the Republic of Iraq to the United States. The embassy is located at 1801 P Street NW, in the Dupont Circle neighborhood.

== Offices ==
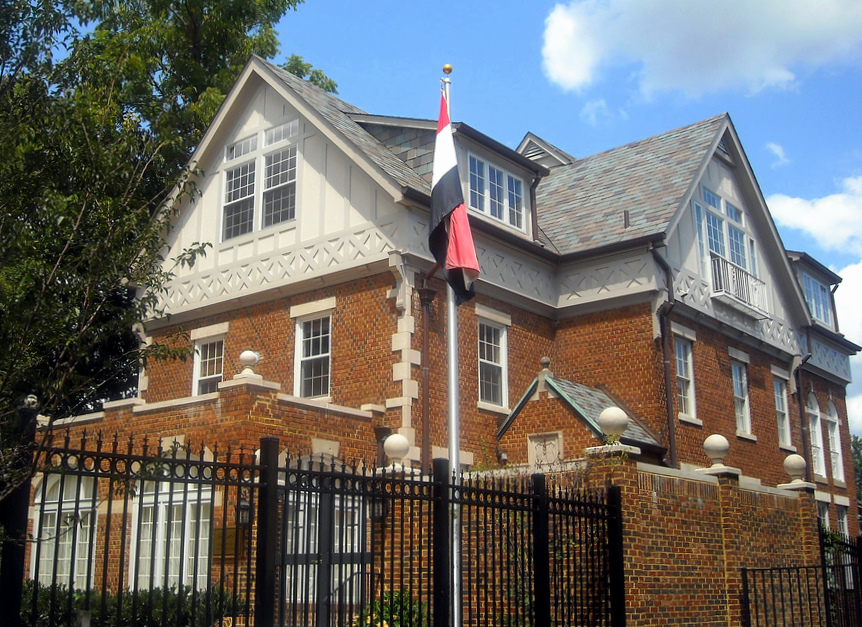
Consular Section of the Embassy of Iraq, 3421 Massachusetts Avenue

The consular section of the embassy is located at 3421 Massachusetts Avenue, N.W., on Embassy Row.

== See also ==
- Embassy of the United States, Baghdad
- Foreign relations of Iraq
- Iraq–United States relations
- List of diplomatic missions in Washington, D.C.
- List of diplomatic missions of Iraq
