= Think Tank Row (Washington, D.C.) =

Think Tank Row designates a cluster of think tanks located on or around Massachusetts Avenue NW in Washington, D.C., between Thomas Circle and Dupont Circle. The expression alludes to Embassy Row, a section of Massachusetts Avenue to the northwest, and has been credited to policy pundit James McGann.

The cluster includes:

- American Enterprise Institute, on 1785 Massachusetts Avenue NW since 2016
- Brookings Institution, on 1775 Massachusetts Avenue NW since 1960 (and 1780 Massachusetts Avenue NW since 2008)
- Carnegie Endowment for International Peace, on 1779 Massachusetts Avenue NW since 1989
- Center for Strategic and International Studies, on 1616 Rhode Island Avenue NW since 2013
- Peterson Institute for International Economics, on 1750 Massachusetts Avenue NW since 2001

It also includes an academic institution that interacts with think tanks:

- Washington Center of the University of California, on 1608 Rhode Island Avenue NW

Other nearby think tanks include the Aspen Institute, the Atlantic Council, the Middle East Institute, the Milken Institute, the German Marshall Fund, the Center for International Policy, the Institute for Policy Studies, the New America Foundation, and Resources for the Future. The Cato Institute and The Heritage Foundation are also located on Massachusetts Avenue, but some distance from Think Tank Row.

== Gallery ==
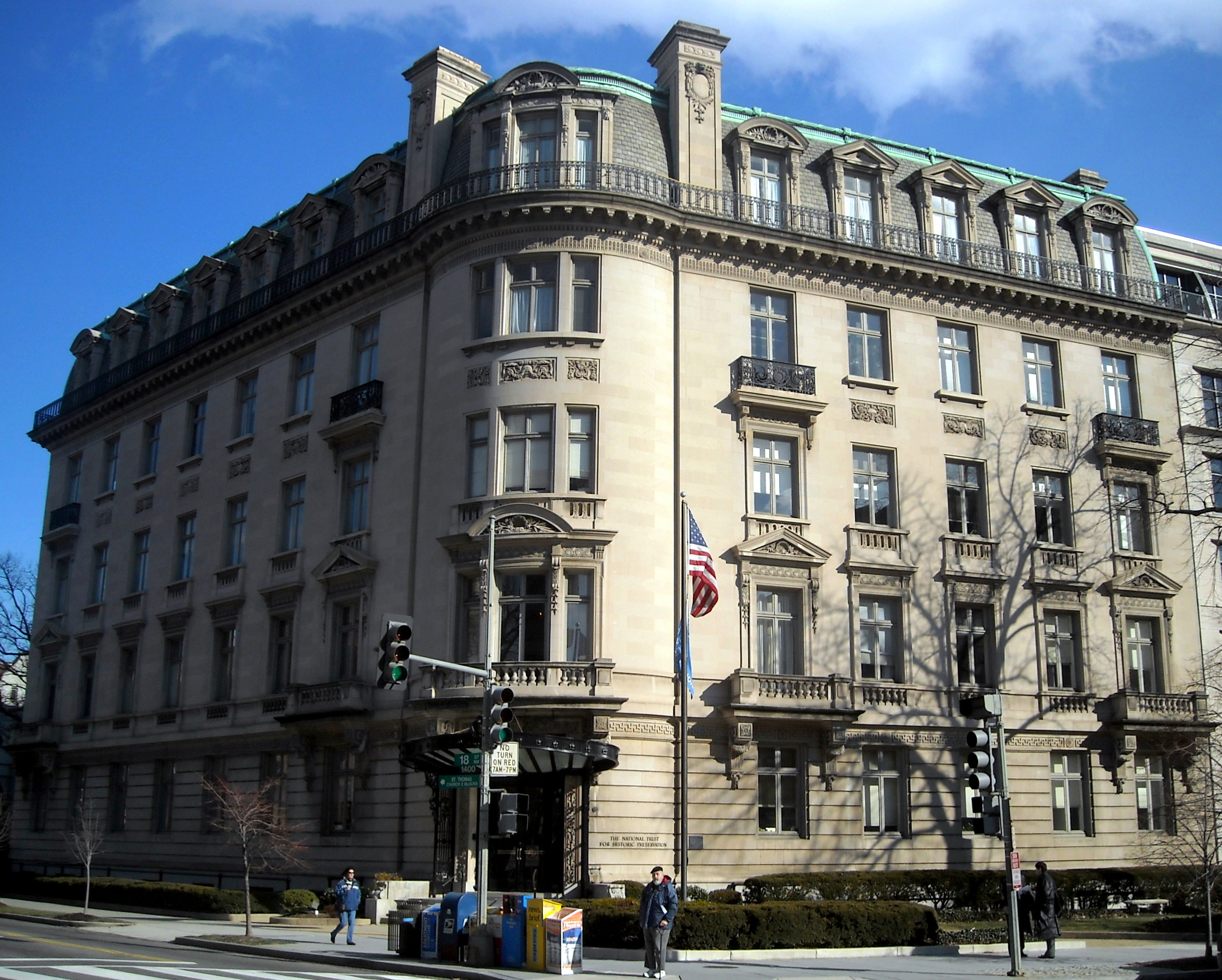
American Enterprise Institute

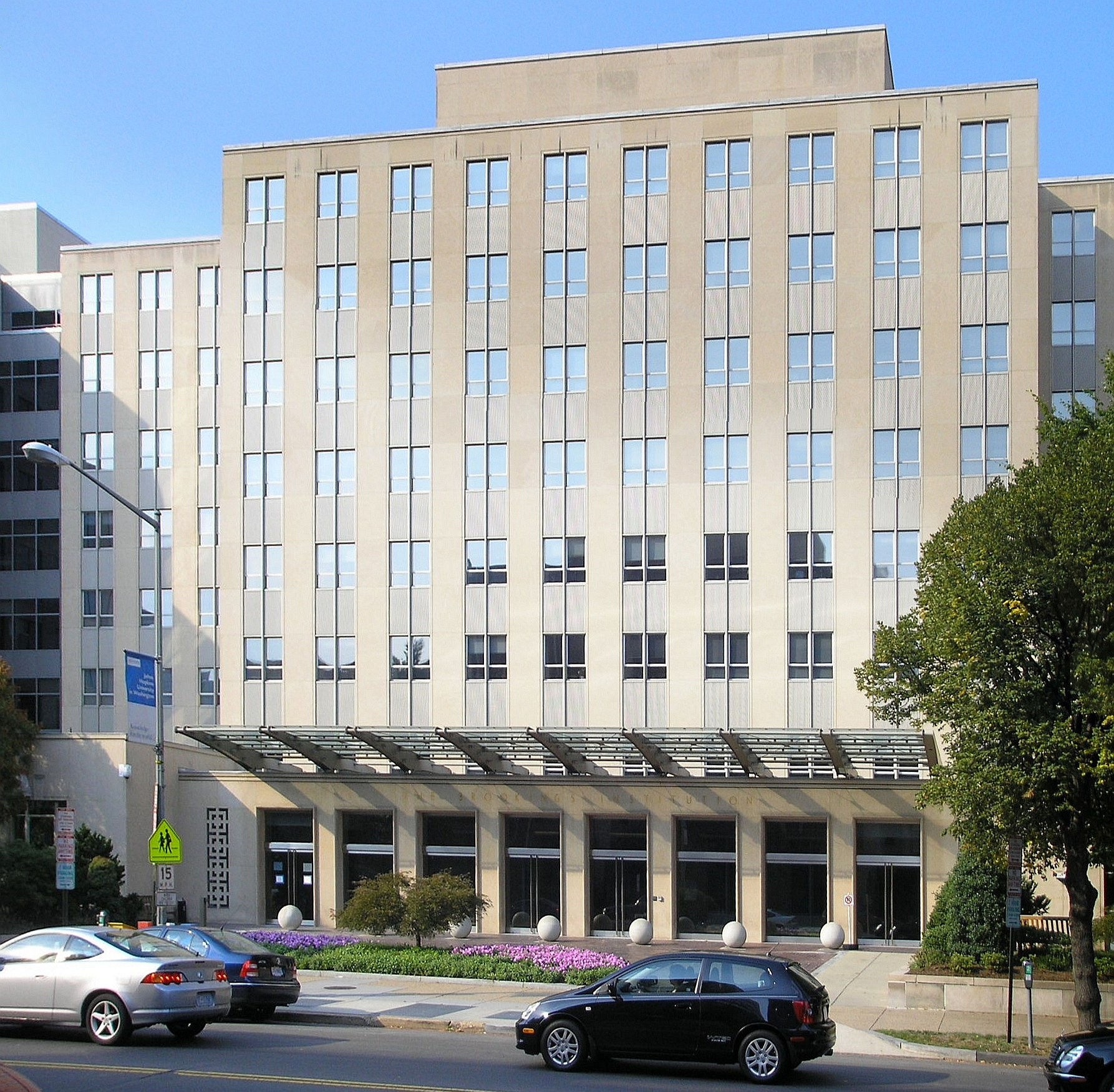
Brookings Institution

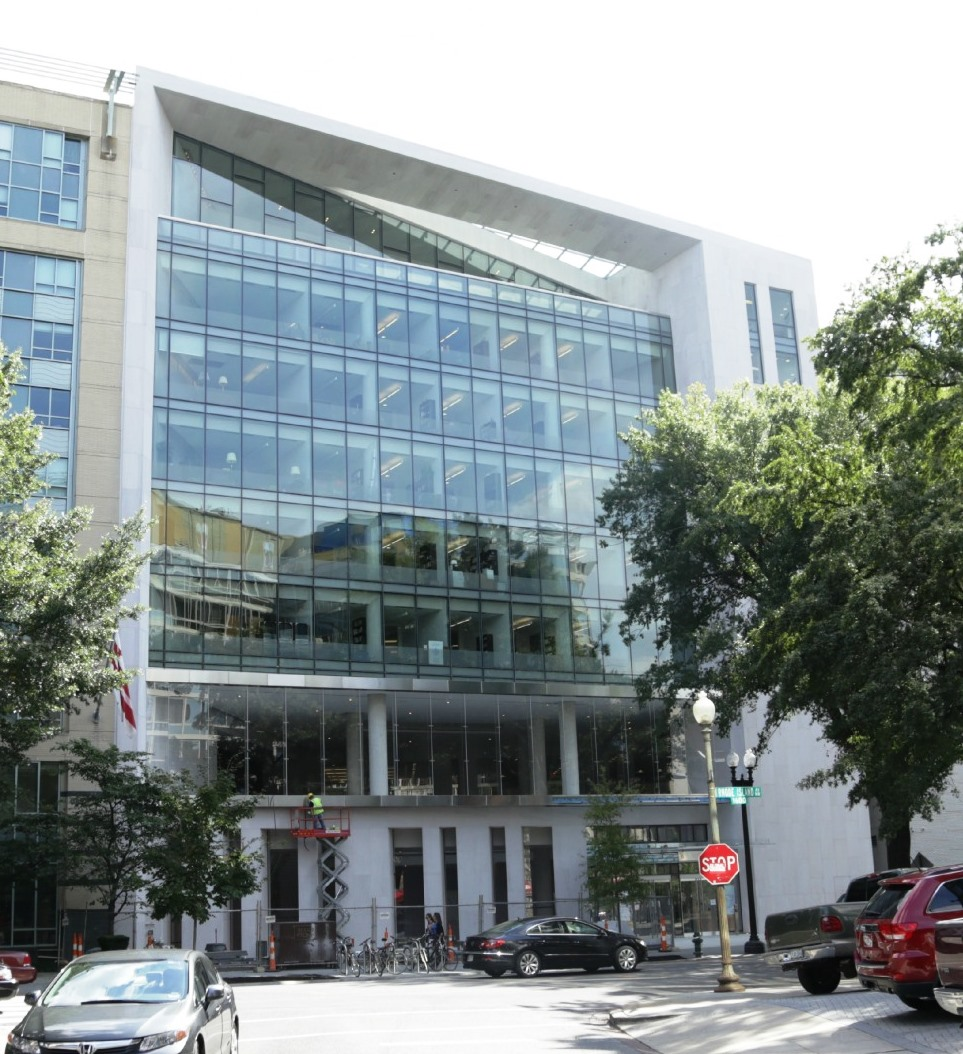
CSIS

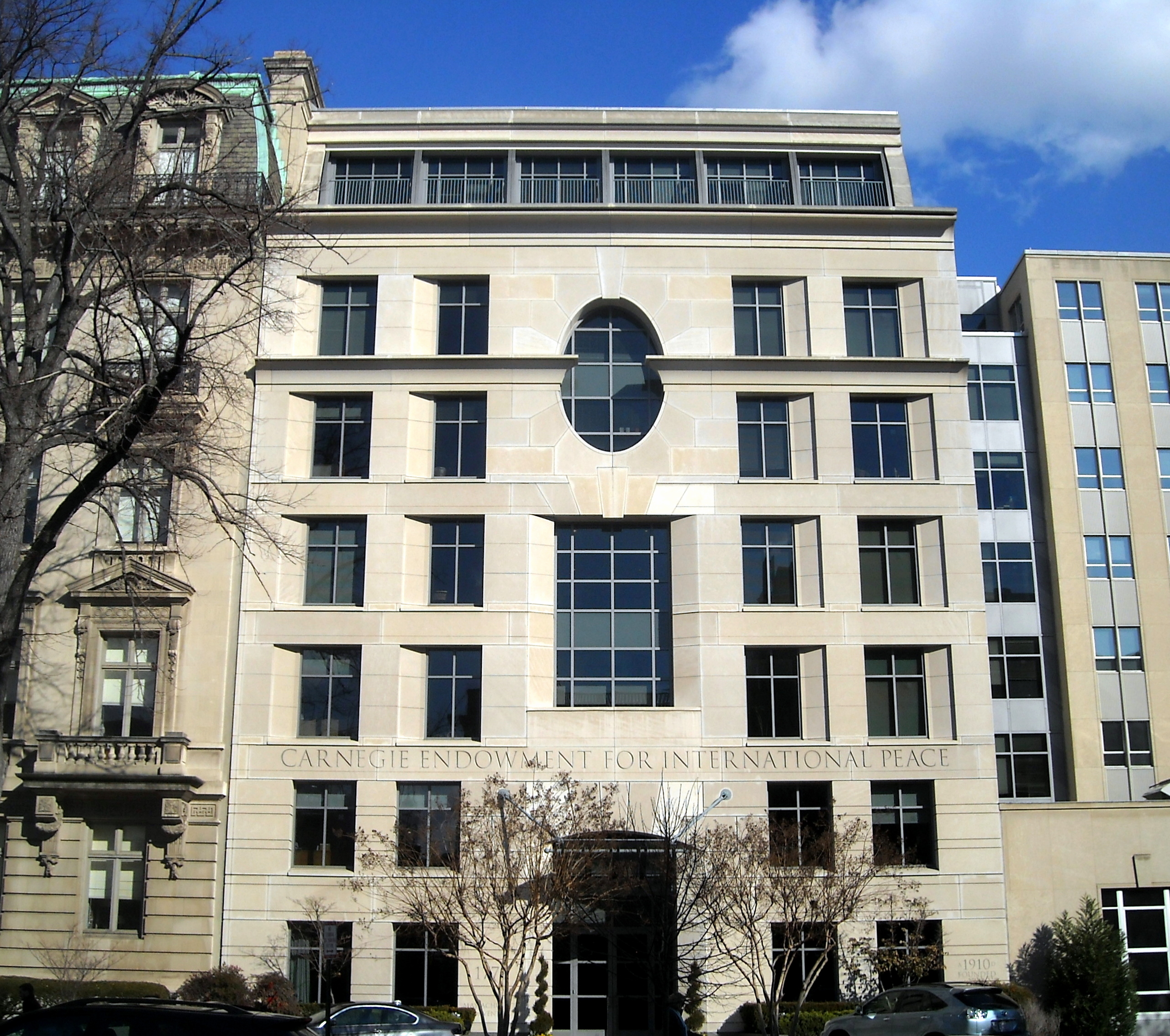
Carnegie Endowment

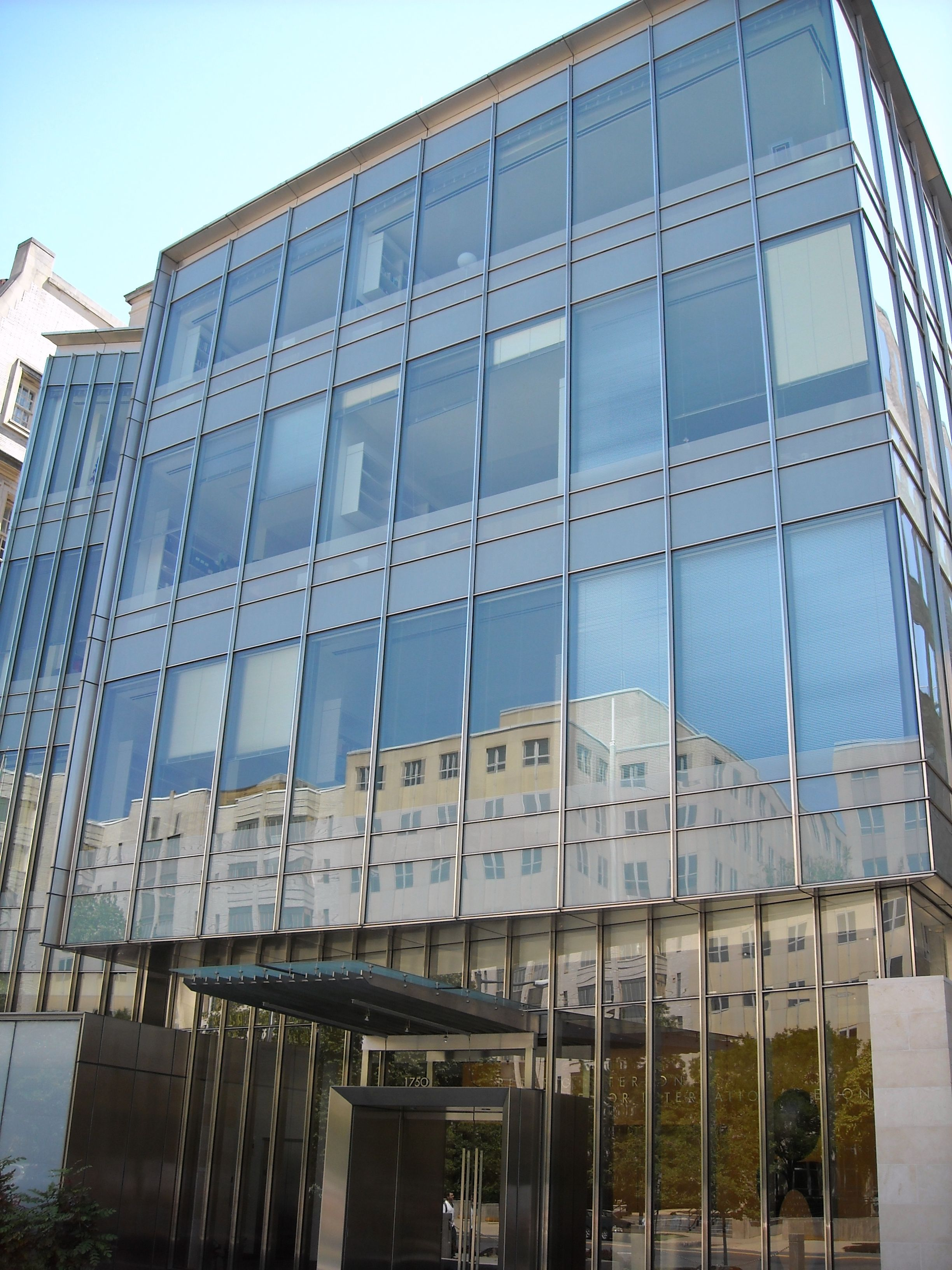
Peterson Institute

== See also ==
- Capitol Hill, in addition to being a metonym for the United States Congress, Capitol Hill is the largest historic residential neighborhood in Washington, D.C.
- Embassy Row
- K Street, the United States’ notable center for lobbying and a metonymy for the US-based lobbying industry containing a cluster of numerous advocacy groups, law firms, trade associations, and some think tanks.
