= Embassy of Haiti, Washington, D.C. =

Diplomatic mission

Embassy of Haiti in Washington, D.C. Ambassade d'Haïti à Washington Anbasad Ayiti nan Washington
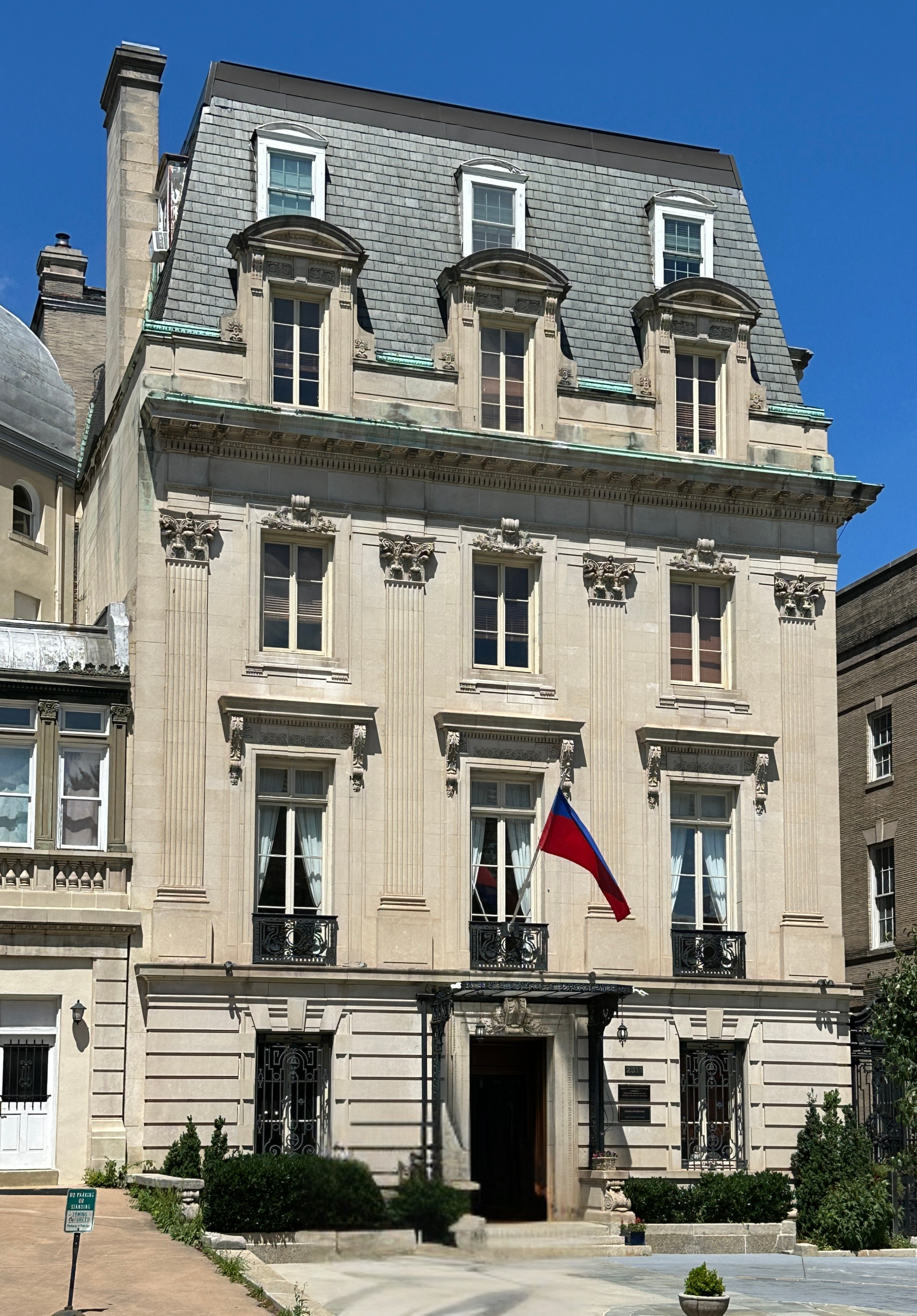
- Embassy of Haiti in 2026
- Location: Washington, D.C.
- Address: 2311 Massachusetts Avenue, N.W.
- Coordinates: 38°54′47.1″N 77°3′5″W
- Ambassador: Bocchit Edmond
- Website: www.haiti.org

The Embassy of Haiti in Washington, D.C. is the diplomatic mission of the Republic of Haiti to the United States. It is located at 2311 Massachusetts Avenue, Northwest, Washington, D.C., in the Embassy Row neighborhood.

The ambassador is Bocchit Edmond, who has served since December 1, 2020.

The mansion, built in 1909–10 for financier Gibson Fahnestock to a design by Nathan C. Wyeth, was purchased in April 1943 by the Republic of China and became its embassy in 1952. It was relinquished in 1978 following the U.S. recognition of the People's Republic of China and to avoid forcible repossession by the PRC.
