= Embassy of Bangladesh, Washington, D.C. =

Diplomatic mission of Bangladesh

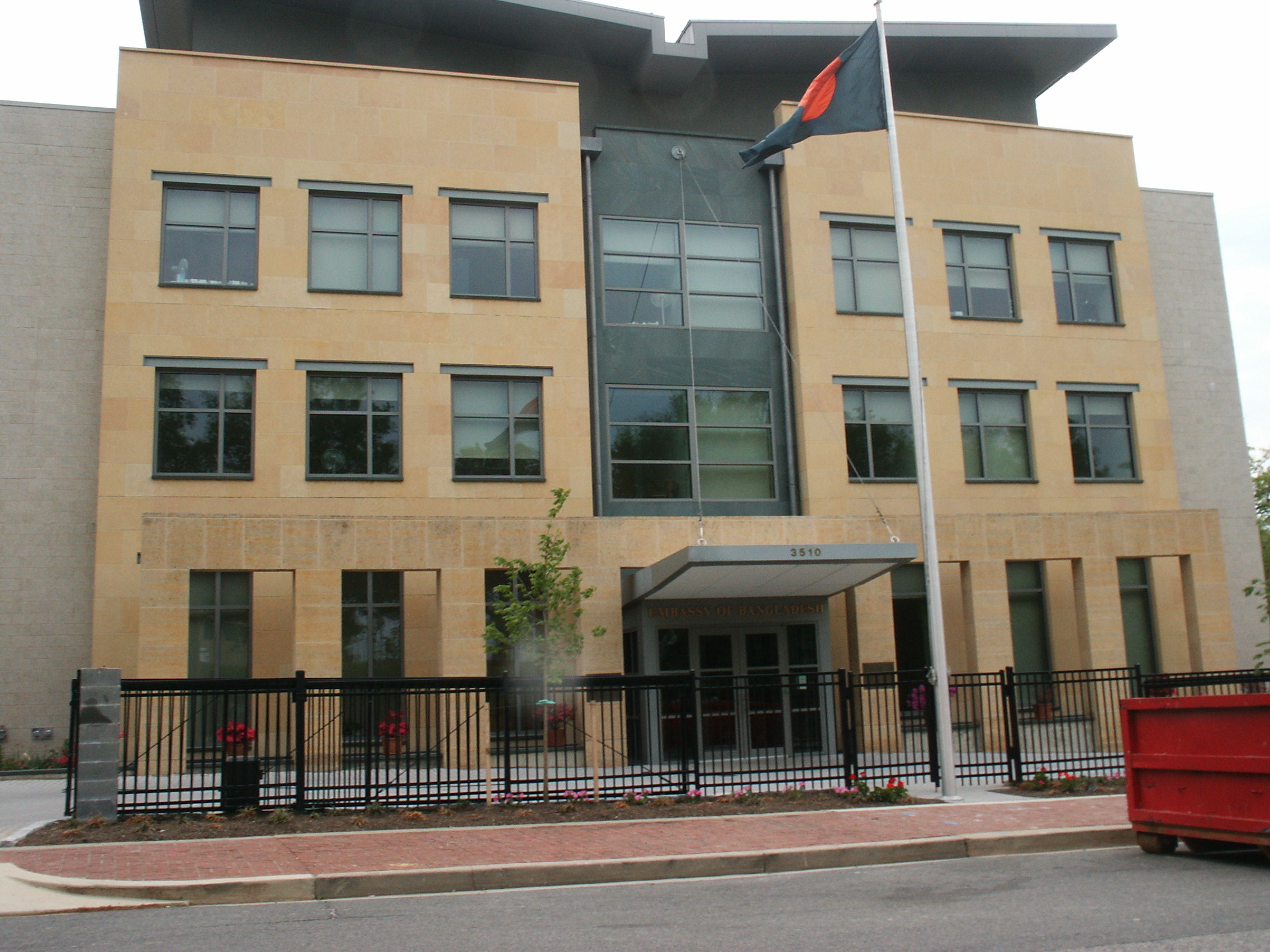
- Embassy of Bangladesh, Washington, D.C.
- Location: Washington, D.C.
- Address: 3510 International Drive, N.W.
- Coordinates: 38°56′30.6″N 77°4′4.6″W
- Ambassador: Tareq Md Ariful Islam
- Website: washington.mofa.gov.bd

The Embassy of Bangladesh, Washington, D.C. is the diplomatic mission of the People's Republic of Bangladesh to the United States. It is located at 3510 International Drive, Northwest, Washington, D.C., in the Cleveland Park neighborhood. The embassy also operates Consulates-General in New York City, Los Angeles, and Miami.

Tareq Md Ariful Islam has been the Ambassador since September 2025.

== History ==
The first temporary embassy of Bangladesh in Washington, D.C., was located on Connecticut Avenue.

In March 1973, Bangladesh bought a building at 1732 Massachusetts Avenue NW, with the intention of establishing it as its first official embassy in Washington, D.C. Some local residents opposed having an embassy at the location. Bangladesh sent an application to convert the home into a chancery; the District of Columbia Board of Zoning Appeals denied the request. The Embassy of Bangladesh disagreed with the denial of its application, stating that the building was located in a designated chancery zone. Bangladesh sold the building to the Republic of Chile, which successfully established its embassy in the building.

The Embassy of Bangladesh in Washington, D.C. was ultimately established at 2201 Wisconsin Avenue NW.

In 2000, the Embassy of Bangladesh moved to 3510 International Drive NW, a building designed by architect Edward Garcia from SmithGroup Architects.

The building's exterior was designed as an abstract metaphor for the delta of the Ganges River. The wings on the roof symbolize unfolding lotus blossoms, and the green stone at the entrance resembles a flowing river.

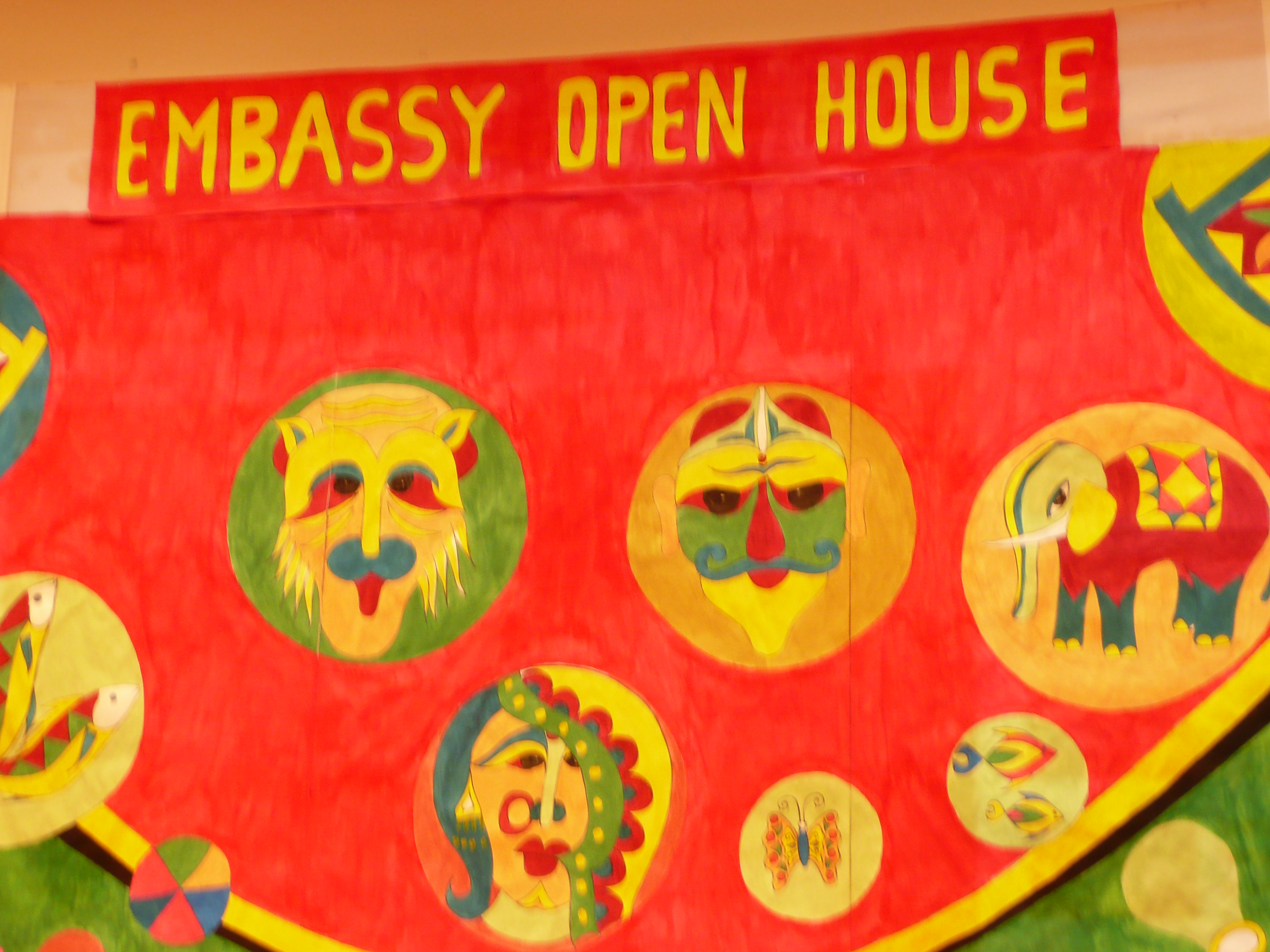
Banner from 2011 Embassy Open House at the Embassy of Bangladesh
