= Bust of Bernardo O'Higgins (Washington, D.C.) =

2009 bust in Washington, D.C., U.S.

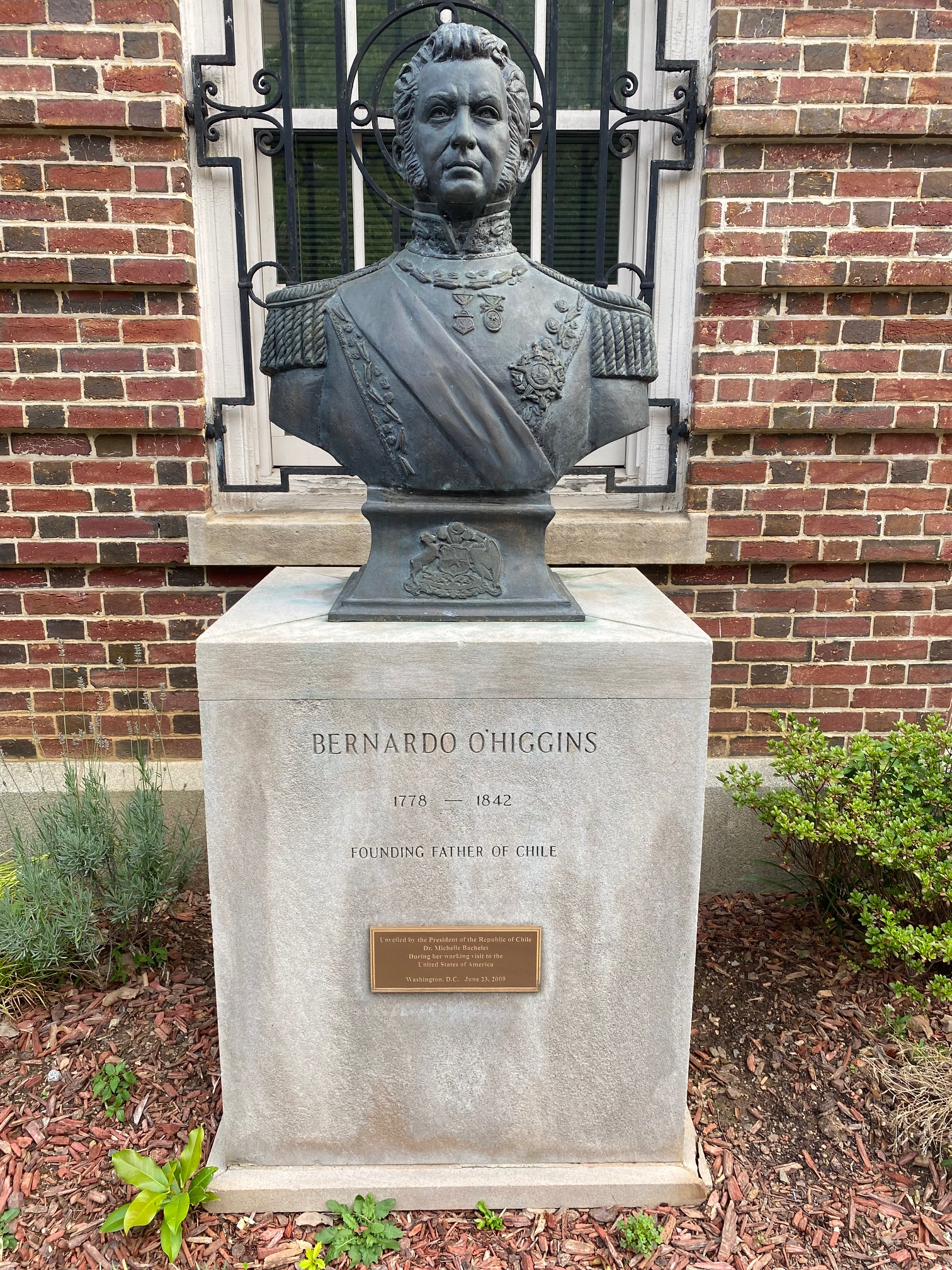
- Artist: Galvarino Ponce Morel
- Year: 2009
- Type: Sculpture
- Subject: Bernardo O'Higgins
- Location: Washington, D.C., United States; 38°54′29.7″N 77°2′23.8″W

An outdoor bust of Bernardo O'Higgins by Galvarino Ponce Morel is installed outside the Embassy of Chile, in the Dupont Circle neighborhood of Washington, D.C., United States.

== See also ==
- 2009 in art
- Bust of Bernardo O'Higgins (Houston)
