= Embassy of Sudan, Washington, D.C. =

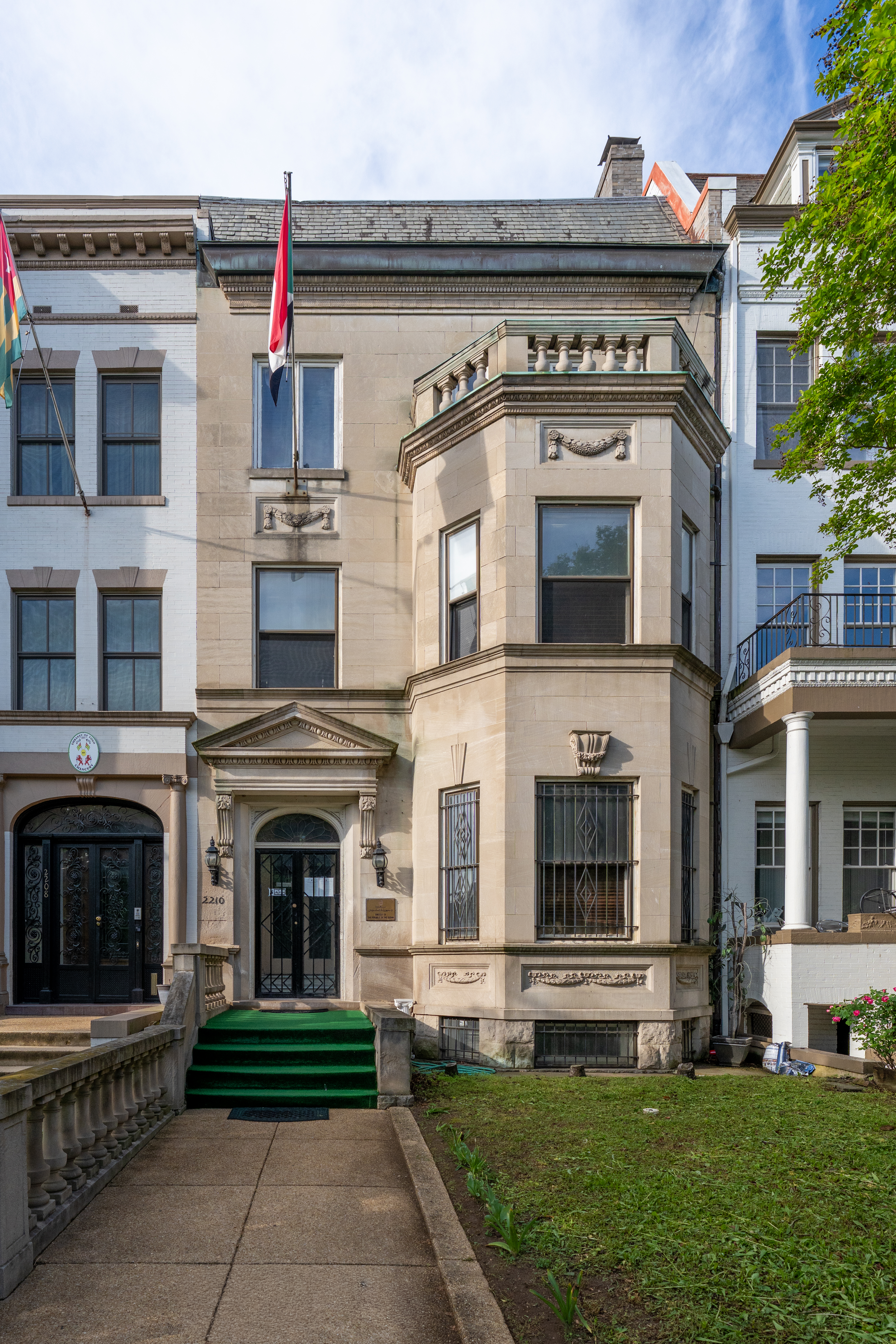
- Location: Washington, D.C., U.S.
- Address: 2210 Massachusetts Avenue, N.W.
- Coordinates: 38°54′41.2″N 77°2′58.1″W

The Embassy of Sudan in Washington, D.C. is the diplomatic mission of the Republic of Sudan to the United States. It is located at 2210 Massachusetts Avenue, Northwest, Washington, D.C., in the Embassy Row neighborhood.

The ambassador is Nureldin Mohamed Hamed Satti.

== Events ==
Groups have been holding monthly vigils at the embassy, about the Darfur conflict.

On March 16, 2012, actor George Clooney was arrested outside the embassy for civil disobedience.
