= Embassy of Paraguay, Washington, D.C. =

Embassy of Paraguay in Washington, D.C.
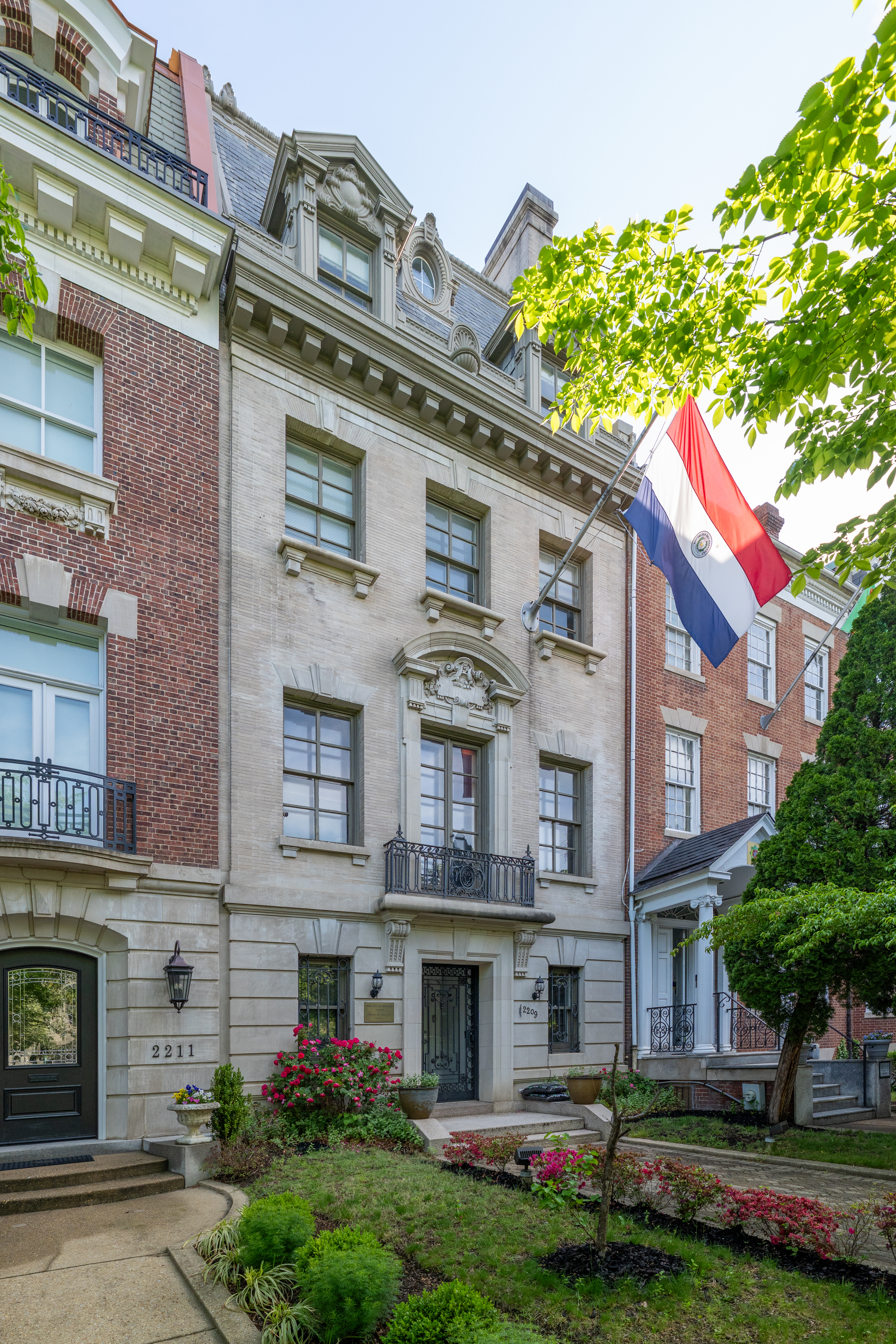
- Location: Washington, D.C.
- Address: 2209 Massachusetts Avenue, N.W.
- Coordinates: 38°54′43.3″N 77°2′57.7″W
- Ambassador: Gustavo Leite
- Website: https://www.mre.gov.py/usa/ Official website

The Embassy of Paraguay in Washington, D.C. is the diplomatic mission of the Republic of Paraguay to the United States. It is located at 2209 Massachusetts Avenue, Northwest, Washington, D.C., in the Embassy Row neighborhood.

The embassy also operates Consulates-General in Los Angeles, Miami, and New York City. The Consulate of Paraguay for the DC Metro area is located at 2 Wisconsin Circle, Chevy Chase, MD 20815 and the contact phone number is (202) 798-7200.

As of July 2021, the ambassador is José Antonio Dos Santos.
