= Embassy of Burkina Faso, Washington, D.C. =

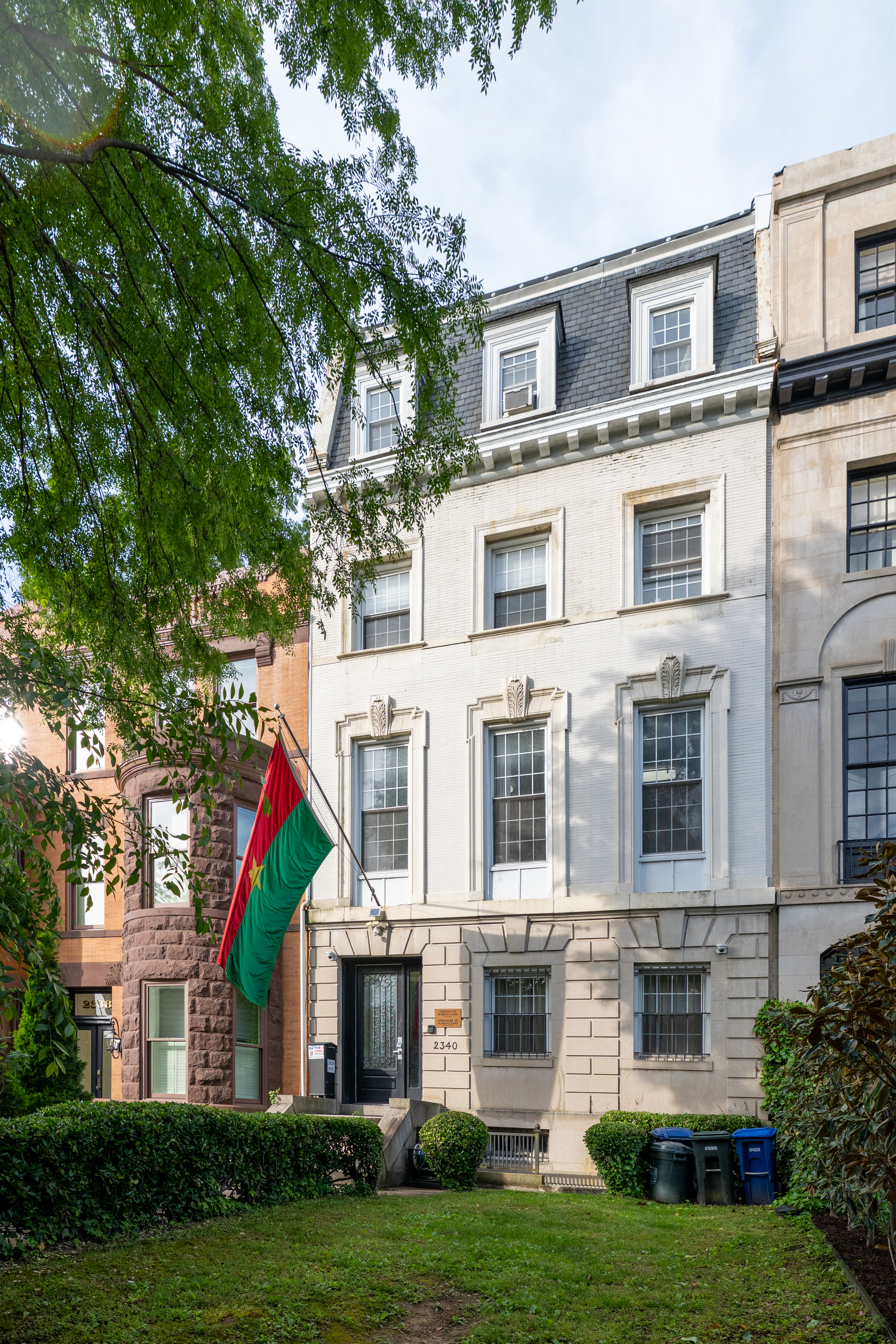
- Location: Washington, D.C.
- Address: 2340 Massachusetts Avenue, N.W.
- Coordinates: 38°54′45.7″N 77°3′6.8″W
- Ambassador: Seydou Kabore
- Website: http://burkina-usa.org/

The Embassy of Burkina Faso in Washington, D.C. is the diplomatic mission of Burkina Faso to the United States. It is located at 2340 Massachusetts Avenue, Northwest, Washington, D.C., in the Embassy Row neighborhood.

The ambassador is Seydou Kabore.

Before 1978, the building hosted services of the embassy of the Republic of China.
