= Embassy of South Africa, Washington, D.C. =

South African Embassy in Washington
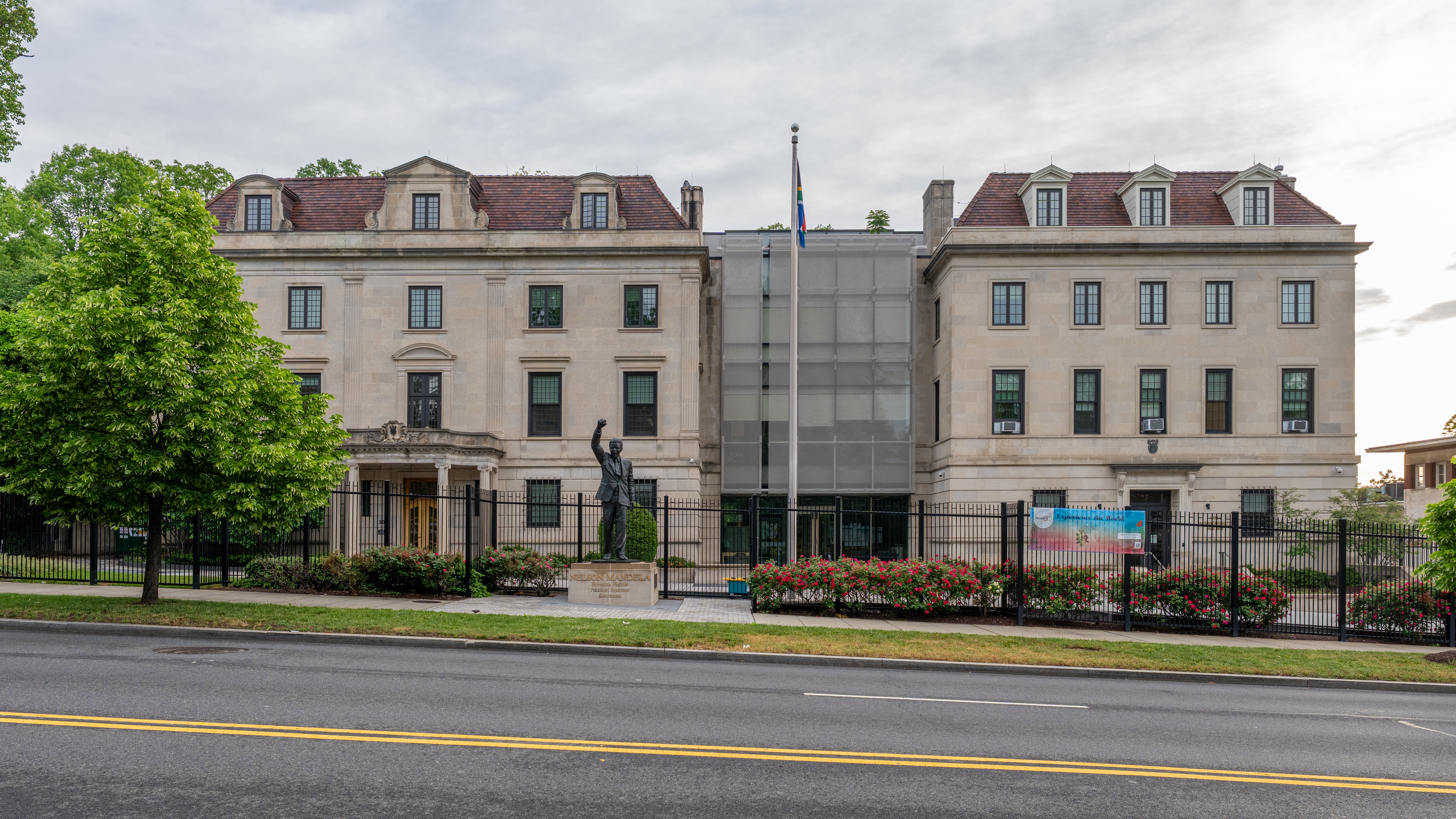
- The Embassy of South Africa in Washington, D.C.
- Location: Washington, D.C., U.S.
- Address: 3051 Massachusetts Avenue, N.W.
- Coordinates: 38°55′12″N 77°03′39″W
- Ambassador: Roelf Meyer
- Chargé d'affaires: Mr Thabo Thage
- Website: saembassy.org

The South African Embassy in Washington, D.C. is the diplomatic mission of the Republic of South Africa to the United States. It is located at 3051 Massachusetts Avenue, Northwest, Washington, D.C. in the Embassy Row neighborhood.

== History ==
South Africa sent its first delegation to the United States in 1929. In 1949, it was raised to a formal embassy. The embassy buildings were built in 1936. Previously the delegation had been housed in a series of leased properties.

The original portion now serves as the ambassadorial residence and a new chancery wing was built next door in 1964. Both structures are in the Cape Dutch style, but with Indiana limestone instead of the traditional whitewashed plaster. The complex is no longer large enough to house the entire ambassadorial delegation service, and is being renovated.

The embassy is temporarily located at 4000 Connecticut Avenue NW, and several offices are located in an annex at 4301 Connecticut Ave NW Suite 220.

The embassy was the target of the anti-apartheid movement in the United States.

== See also ==
- South Africa Ambassador to United States
- Statue of Nelson Mandela, sculpture of Nelson Mandela by Jean Doyle, installed outside the embassy in 2013
