= Embassy of Sri Lanka, Washington, D.C. =

Embassy of Sri Lanka
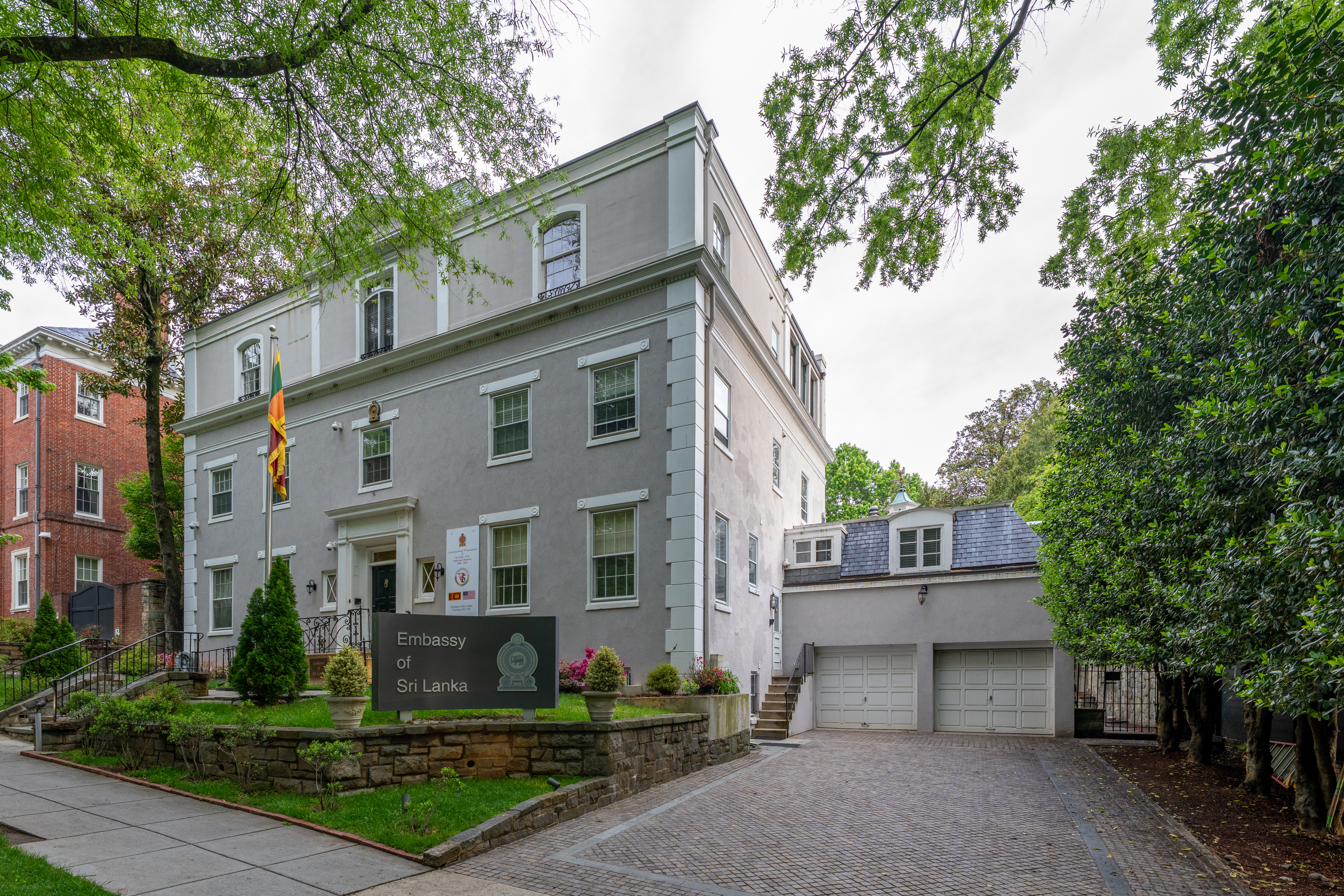
- Location: Washington, D.C.
- Address: 3025 Whitehaven Street NW, N.W.
- Coordinates: 38°55′0.8″N 77°2′56″W
- Ambassador: Prasad Kariyawasam

The Embassy of Sri Lanka in Washington, D.C. is the Democratic Socialist Republic of Sri Lanka's diplomatic mission to the United States. It is located at 3025 Whitehaven Street N.W. in Washington, D.C.'s Kalorama neighborhood.

As of May 2021, the current Ambassador is Ravinatha Pandukabhaya Aryasinha.
