= Embassy of Malaysia, Washington, D.C. =

Embassy

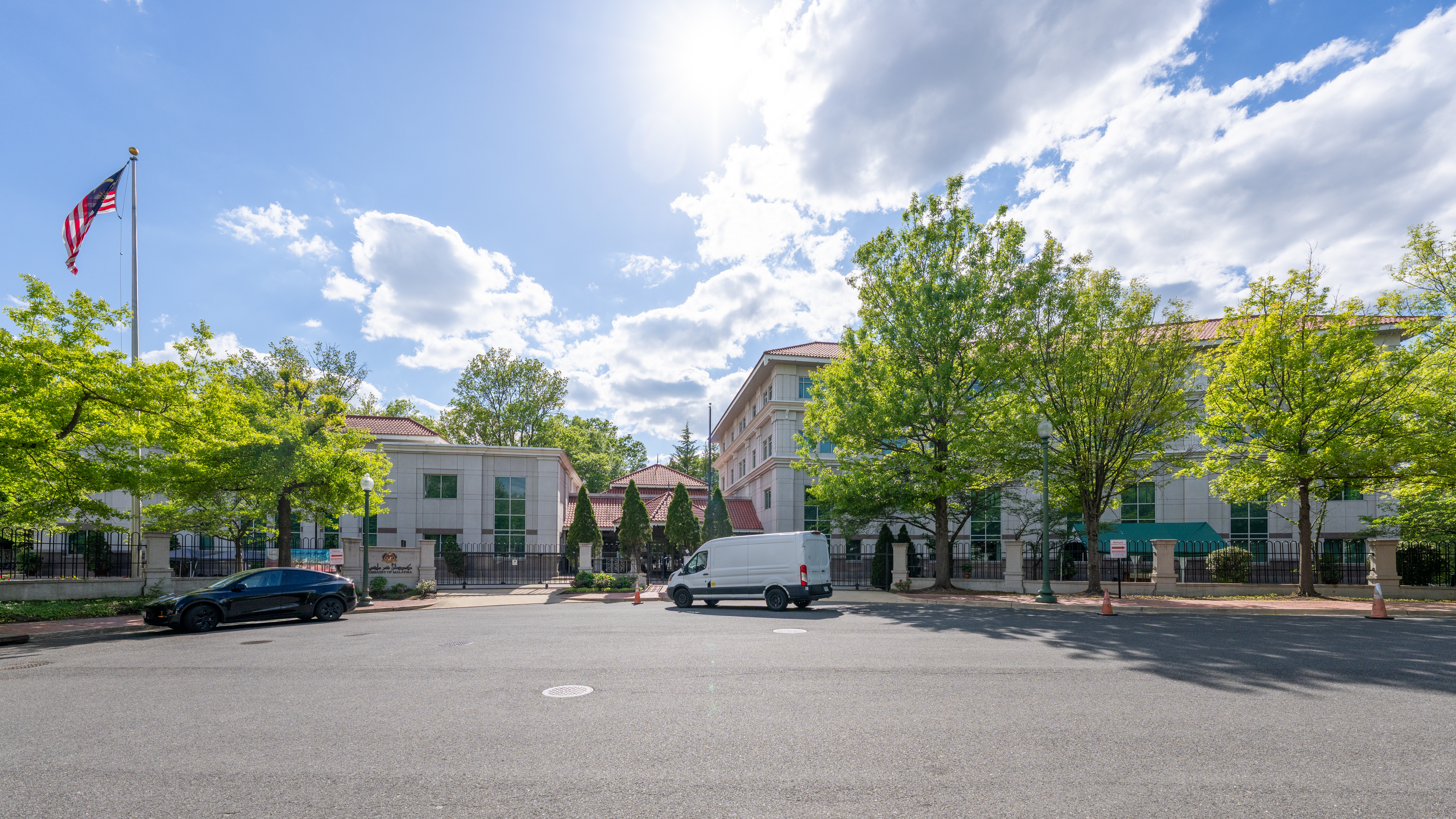
- Location: Washington, D.C.
- Address: 3516 International Court, N.W.
- Coordinates: 38°56′37.4″N 77°4′9″W
- Ambassador: H.E. Ambassador Tan Sri Muhammad Shahrul Ikram Yaakob

The Embassy of Malaysia in Washington, D.C. is the diplomatic mission of Malaysia to the United States. It is located at 3516 International Court NW in Washington, D.C.

The embassy also operates Consulates-General in Los Angeles and New York City.
