= Embassy of Jordan, Washington, D.C. =

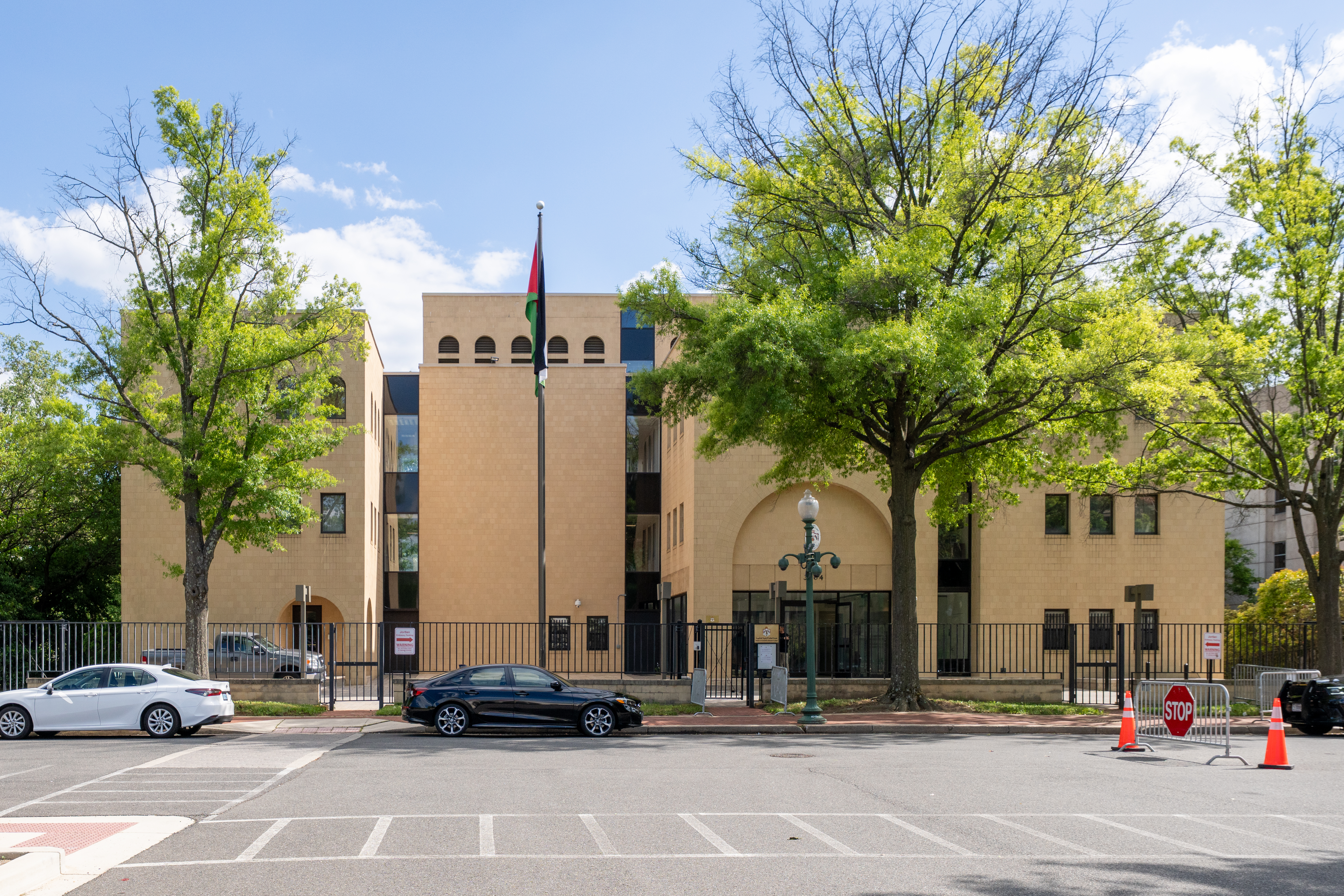
- Location: Washington, D.C.
- Address: 3504 International Drive, N.W.
- Coordinates: 38°56′28.5″N 77°03′59″W
- Ambassador: Dina Kawar

The Embassy of Jordan in Washington, D.C. is the diplomatic mission of the Hashemite Kingdom of Jordan to the United States. It is located at 3504 International Drive Northwest, Washington, D.C., in the Cleveland Park neighborhood.

The Ambassador is Dina Kawar.
