= Embassy of Egypt, Washington, D.C. =

Diplomatic mission of Egypt to the United States

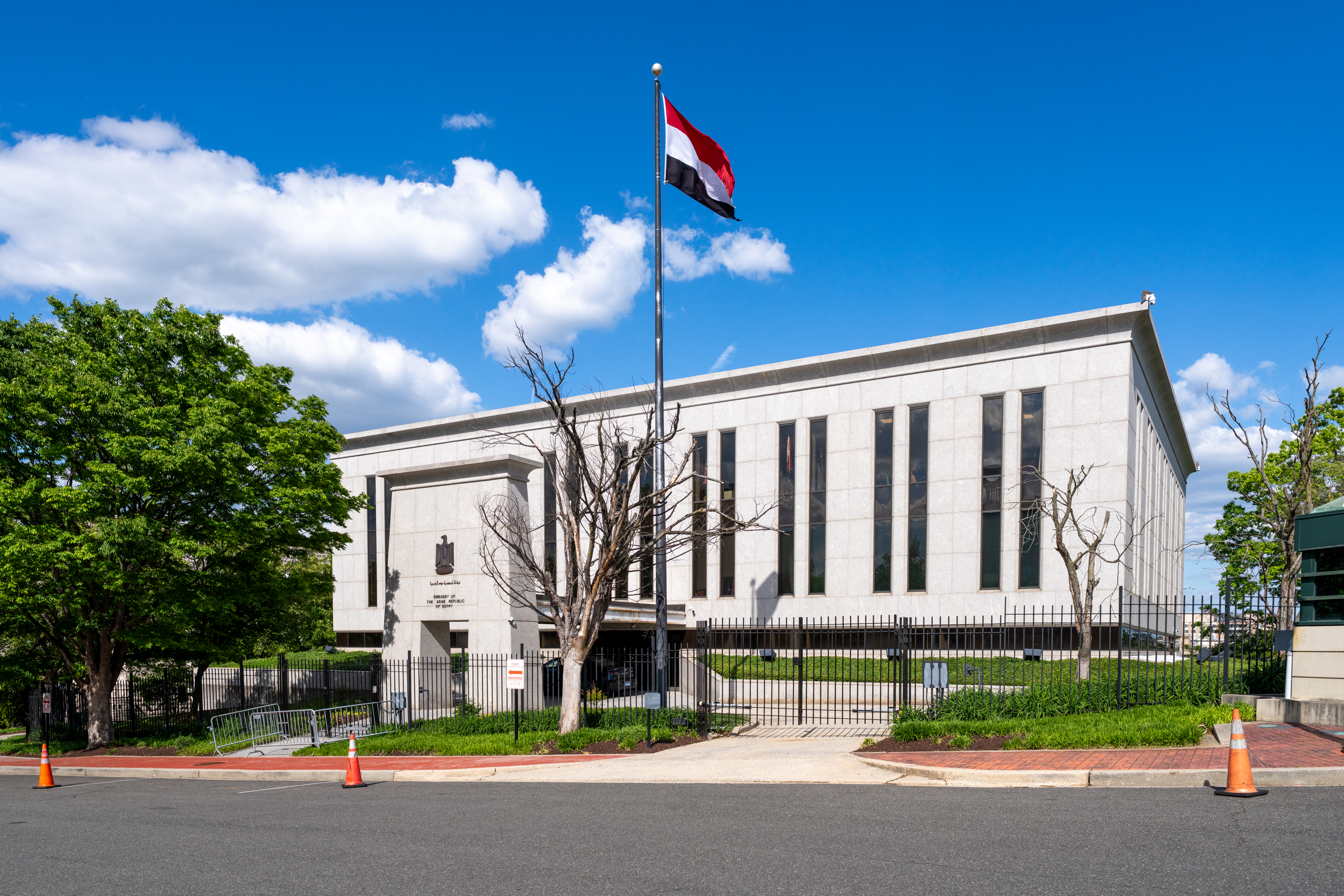
- Location: Washington, D.C.
- Address: 3521 International Court, N.W.
- Coordinates: 38°56′42″N 77°4′5″W
- Ambassador: Mohamed El-Molla

The Embassy of Egypt in Washington, D.C. is the diplomatic mission of the Arab Republic of Egypt to the United States. It is located at 3521 International Court, Northwest, Washington, D.C., in the Cleveland Park neighborhood.

The embassy also operates Consulates-General in Chicago, Houston, Los Angeles, and New York City.

The Ambassador is Mohamed El-Molla, who assumed his duties since the seventh of September 2026.

== History ==
Following the establishment of diplomatic relations, the U.S. Consulate in Cairo was elevated to a Legation. In the U.S., a legation of the Kingdom of Egypt was opened on January 22, 1924, which was upgraded to Embassy level on October 10, 1946. Relations continued under the United Arab Republic until the Six-Day War in 1967, only being reestablished in 1974.

In 2011 the embassy was the site of protests as a part of the Arab Spring.

== List of representatives ==
#	Ambassador	Title	Date of appointment
1	S. Yousry Pasha	Envoy Extraordinary and Minister Plenipotentiary	January 22, 1924
-	Ismail Kamel Bey	Charge d'Affaires (a.i.)	April 17, 1925
2	Mahmoud Samy Pasha	E.E. and M.P.	July 16, 1925
-	Ahmed Mamdouh Moursi	Charge d'Affaires (a.i.)	November 30, 1929
-	Aly Ismail Bey	Charge d'Affaires (a.i.)	March 19, 1930
3	Sesostris Sidarouss Pasha	E.E. and M.P.	August 14, 1931
-	Nicolas Khalil Bey	Charge d'Affaires (a.i.)	February 8, 1933
4	Ibrahim Ratib Bey	E.E. and M.P.	October 2, 1934
-	Nicolas Khalil Bey	Charge d'Affaires (a.i.)	February 1, 1935
5	Mohamed Youssef Bey	E.E. and M.P.	October 29, 1935
-	Hussein Mahmoud Rady	Charge d'Affaires (a.i.)	February 7, 1938
6	Mahmoud Hassan Bey	E.E. and M.P.	September 30, 1938 (Note: Agrément on October 11 of the same year.)
7	Mahmoud Hassan	Ambassador Extraordinary and Plenipotentiary	October 10, 1946 (Note: Legation raised to embassy on the same date.)
-	Anis Azer	Charge d'Affaires (a.i.)	February 9, 1948
8	Mohamed Kamel Abdul Rahim	Amb. E. and P.	September 10, 1948 (Note: Agrément granted on the 14th.)
-	Abdel Shafi El Labban	Charge d'Affaires (a.i.)	April 19, 1953
9	Ahmed Hussein	Amb. E. and P.	April 29, 1953 (Note: Agrément granted on May 4.)
10	Mostafa Kamel	Amb. E. and P.	July 30, 1958 (Note: Agrément granted on August 11, representing the United Arab Republic.)
11	Ahmed Hassan El-Fikki	Amb. E. and P.	April 8, 1967 (Note: Relations were severed, prior to his arrival to D.C., on June 6. During this period, the Indian Embassy represented Egyptian interests in the United States.)
12	Ashraf 'Abd al-Latif Ghorbal	Amb. E. and P.	March 28, 1974 (Note: Agrément granted on April 19.)
13	El Sayed Abdel Raouf El Reedy	Amb. E. and P.	November 30, 1984 (Note: Agrément granted on December 10.)
14	Ahmed Maher El Sayed	Amb. E. and P.	July 9, 1992 (Note: Agrément granted on September 8.)
15	Mohamed Nabil Ismail Fahmy	Amb. E. and P.	October 15, 1999 (Note: Agrément granted on November 29.)
16	Sameh Shoukry	Amb. E. and P.	2008
17	Mohamed Tawfik	Amb. E. and P.	2012
18	Yasser Reda	Amb. E. and P.	2015
19	Motaz Zahran	Amb. E. and P.	July 2020
20	Mohamed El-Molla	Amb. E. and P.	September 7, 2026

== See also ==
- List of diplomatic missions of Egypt
- Egypt–United States relations
- List of ambassadors of the United States to Egypt
