= Statue of Nelson Mandela (Washington, D.C.) =

Statue in Washington, D.C., U.S.

- The statue in 2014
- Artist: Jean Doyle
- Year: 2013
- Type: Sculpture
- Subject: Nelson Mandela
- Dimensions: 2.7 m (9 ft)
- Location: Washington, D.C., United States; 38.919921°N 77.061043°W

An outdoor sculpture of Nelson Mandela by Jean Doyle is installed outside the Embassy of South Africa, Washington, D.C., in the United States. The 9-foot (2.7 m) statue was unveiled on September 21, 2013.

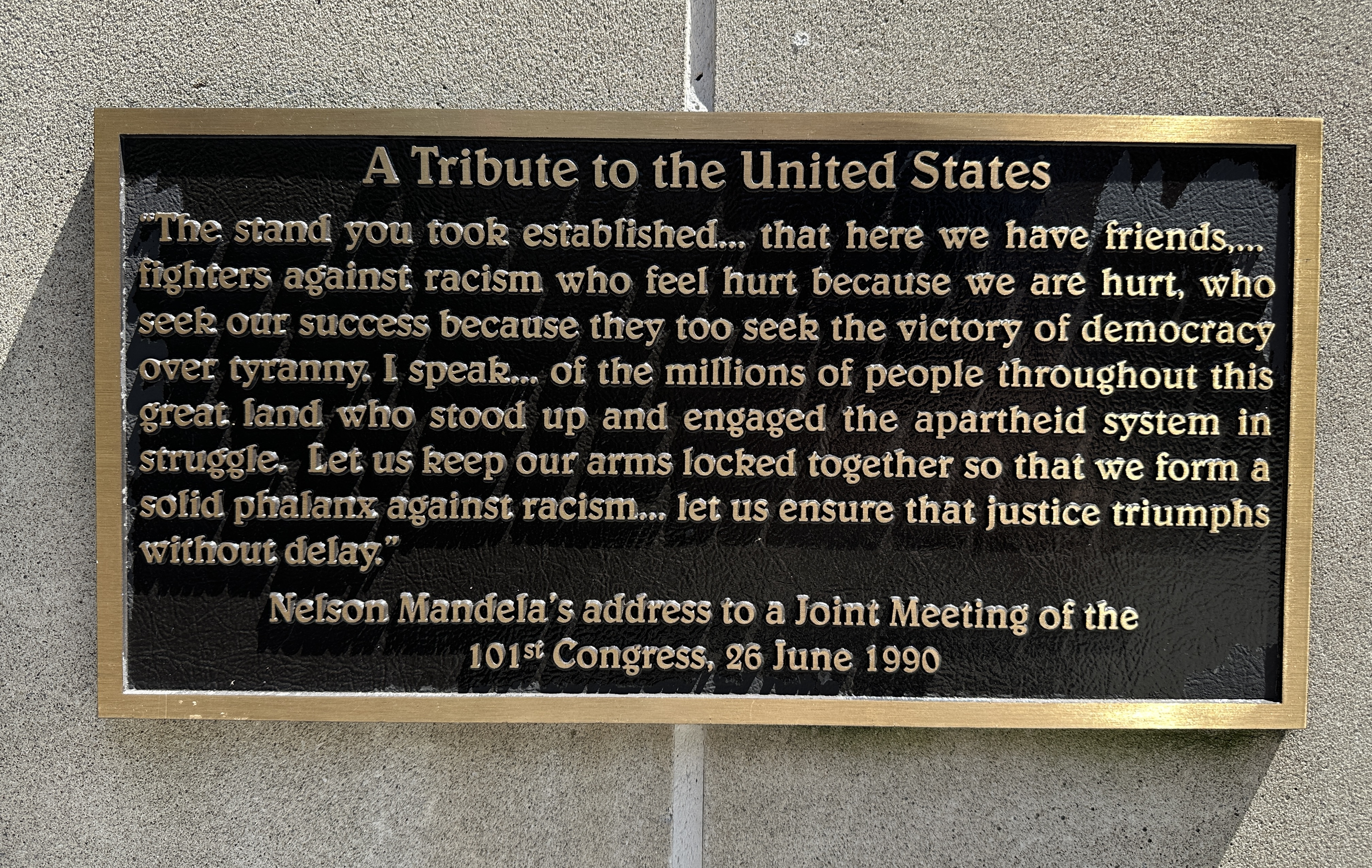
Plaque on the statue base

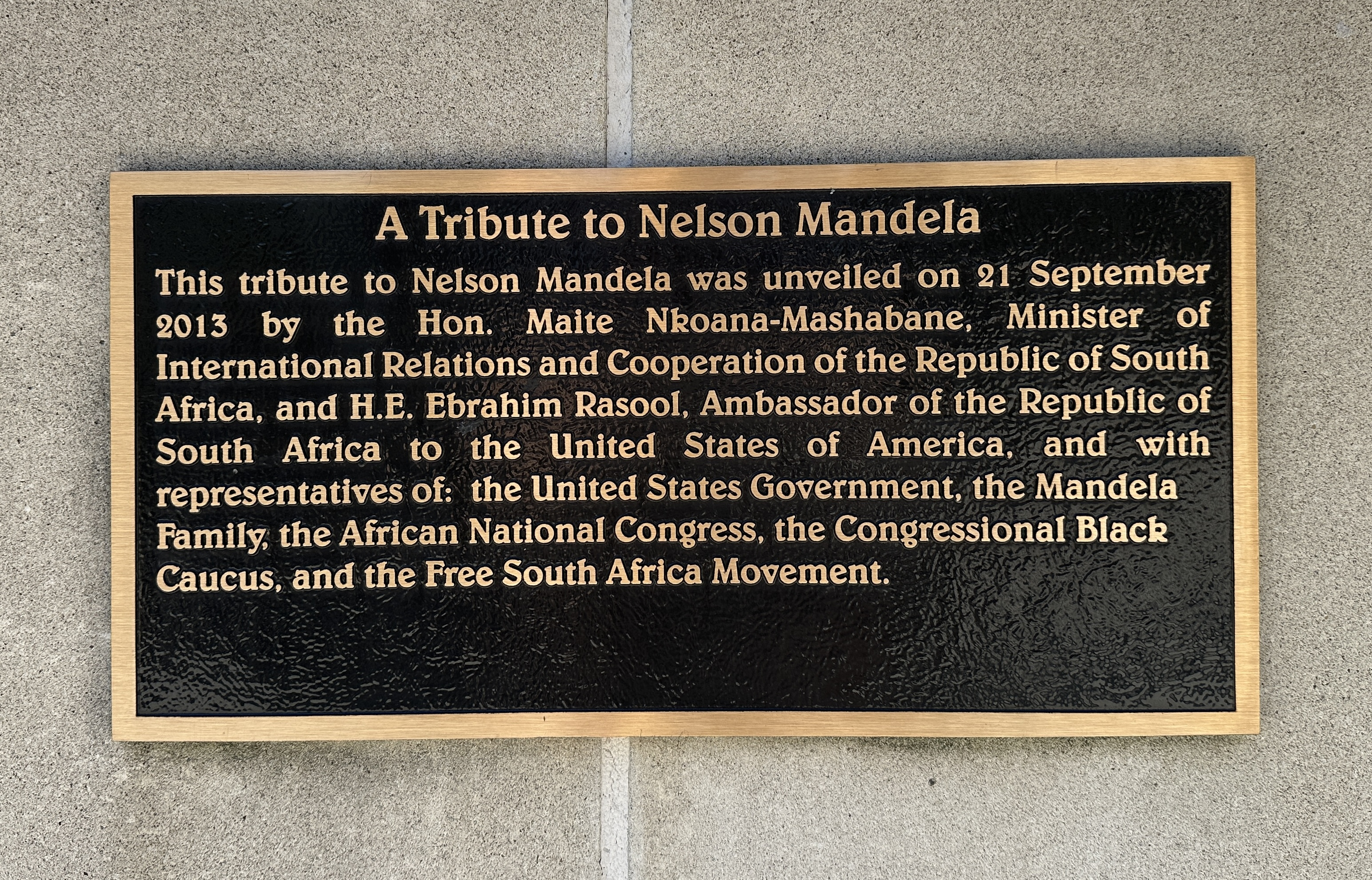
Plaque on the statue base

== See also ==
- 2013 in art
