= Embassy of Chile, Washington, D.C. =

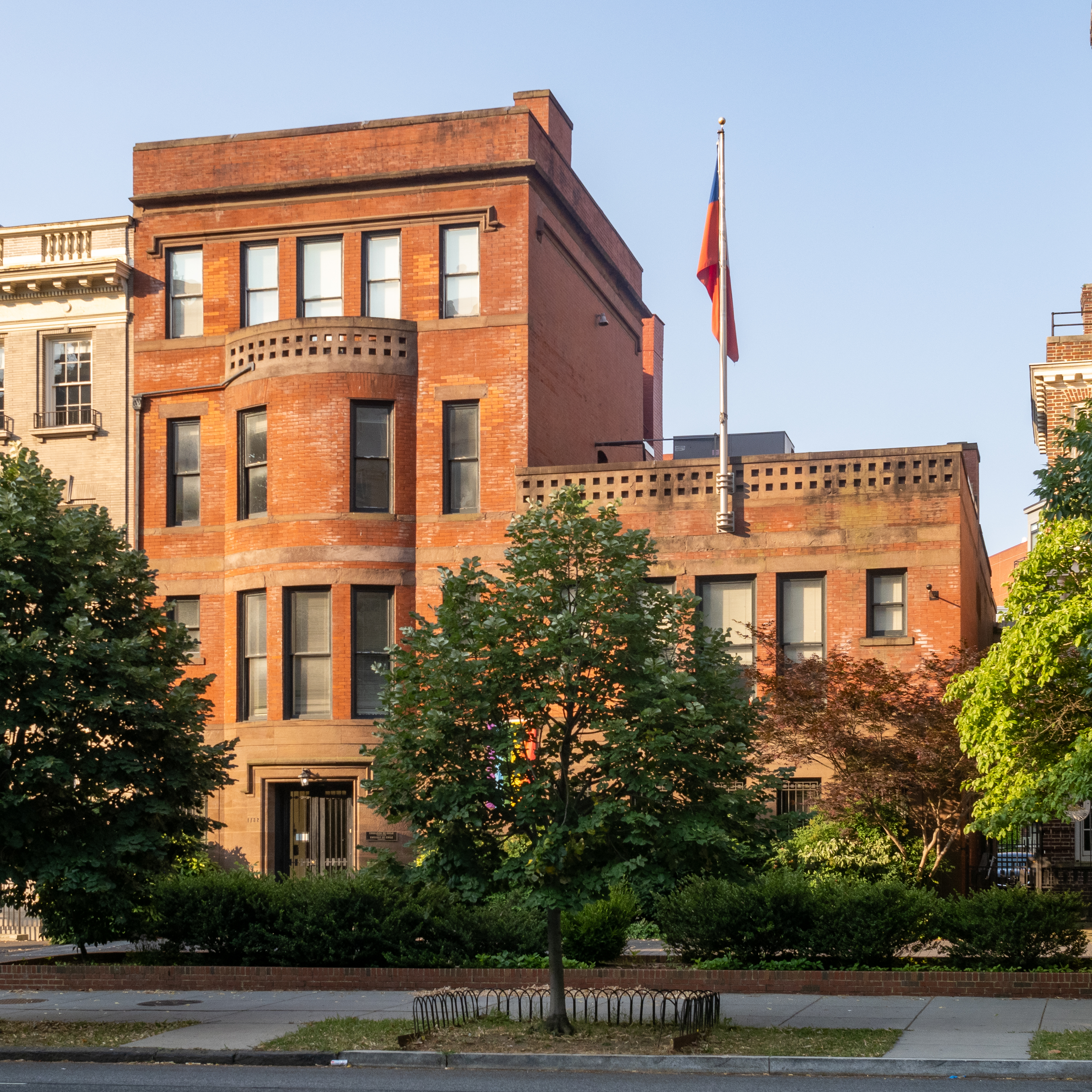
- Location: Washington, D.C.
- Address: 1732 Massachusetts Avenue, N.W.
- Coordinates: 38°54′29.1″N 77°2′23.5″W
- Ambassador: Andrés Ergas-Heymann
- Website: chile.gob.cl/estados-unidos/en/

The Embassy of Chile in Washington, D.C. is the diplomatic mission of the Republic of Chile to the United States. It is located at 1732 Massachusetts Avenue, Northwest, Washington, D.C., in the Embassy Row neighborhood. The embassy has been located there since 1973. The building now occupied by the Chilean Embassy previously housed the Embassy of Bangladesh.

The embassy also operates Consulates-General in Miami, Los Angeles, San Francisco, Houston, Chicago, and New York City.

The ambassador is Andrés Ergas-Heymann.

The ambassador's residence is located further northwest on Embassy Row, 2305 Massachusetts Avenue NW. Designed by architect Nathan C. Wyeth, the residence has belonged to the Republic of Chile since 1923.

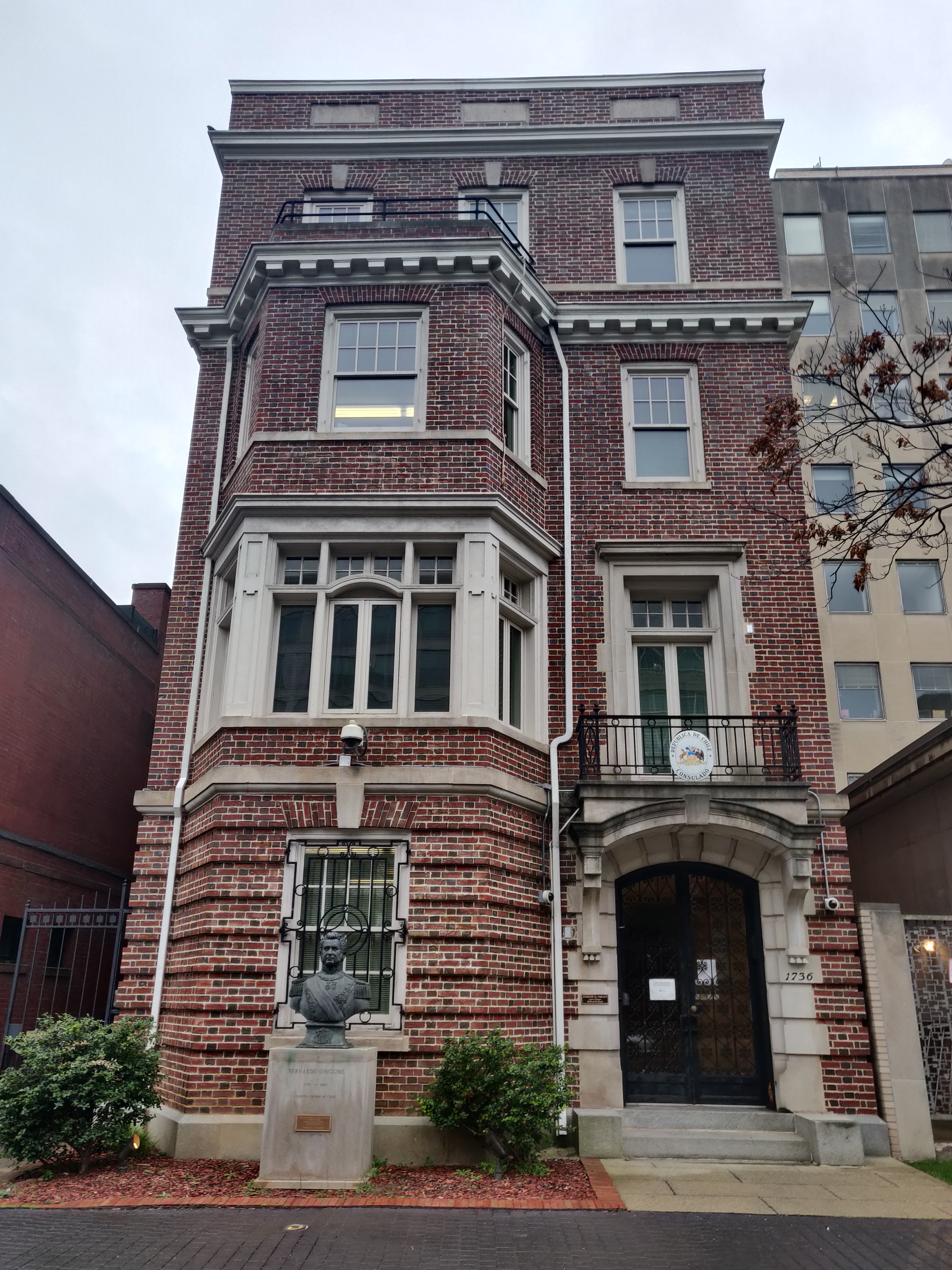
Consulate-General of Chile in Washington, D.C.

== See also ==
- Bust of Bernardo O'Higgins (Washington, D.C.), a sculpture installed outside the embassy
