= Lists of ambassadors to the United States =

The following table lists ambassadors to the United States, per the U.S. Department of State's protocol list, as of September 19, 2025, when it was last updated, sorted by the representative country or organization.

Sending country	List	Current ambassador	Credential presented	Embassy	Embassy website
Afghanistan	List	There are no accredited Afghan diplomats to the United States since the U.S. forced the closure of the Embassy of Afghanistan, Washington, D.C. in 2022.			
African Union		Constância Adelina Gaspar	December 16, 2025	Embassy	
Albania	List	Ervin Bushati	July 2023	Embassy	
Algeria	List	Sabri Boukadoum	2023	Embassy	
Andorra	List	Joan Forner Rovira			
Angola		Agostinho de Carvalho dos Santos Van-Dúnem	June 30, 2023	Embassy	
Antigua and Barbuda	List	Ronald Sanders	September 17, 2015	Embassy	
Argentina	List	Jorge Argüello	February 6, 2020	Embassy	
Armenia	List	Lilit Makunts	September 15, 2021	Embassy	
Australia	List	Greg Moriarty	April 1, 2026	Embassy	
Austria	List	Petra Schneebauer	April 1, 2026	Embassy	
Azerbaijan	List	Khazar Ibrahim	September 15, 2021	Embassy	
The Bahamas	List	Wendall Kermith Jones	April 19, 2022	Embassy	
Bahrain	List	Abdullah bin Rashid Al Khalifa	July 21, 2017	Embassy	
Bangladesh	List	Tareq Md Ariful Islam	September 3, 2025	Embassy	
Barbados	List	Noel Anderson Lynch	January 11, 2019	Embassy	
Belarus		Vacant; Pavel Shidlovsky, chargé d'affaires a.i.	August 9, 2022	Embassy	
Belgium	List	Jean-Arthur Régibeau	September 17, 2020	Embassy	
Belize	List	Lynn Raymond Young	July 7, 2021	Embassy	
Benin	List	Jean-Claude Félix Do Rego	July 17, 2020	Embassy	
Bhutan		The United States does not maintain diplomatic relations with Bhutan.			
Bolivia		Vacant; Henry Baldelomar Chavez, chargé d'affaires a.i.	October 11, 2023	Embassy	
Bosnia and Herzegovina	List	Sven Alkalaj	June 30, 2023	Embassy	
Botswana	List	Kitso Mokaila	September 17, 2020	Embassy	
Brazil	List	Maria Luiza Ribeiro Viotti	June 30, 2023	Embassy	
Brunei	List	Serbini Ali	January 28, 2016	Embassy	
Bulgaria	List	Georgi Panayotov	June 7, 2022	Embassy	
Burkina Faso	List	Vacant; Hermann Yirigouin Toe, chargé d'affaires a.i.	September 27, 2022	Embassy	
Burundi	List	Jean Bosco Barege	February 27, 2024	Embassy	
Cambodia	List	Keo Chhea	April 19, 2022	Embassy	
Cameroon	List	Henri Étoundi Essomba	June 27, 2016	Embassy	
Canada	List	Mark Wiseman	February 15, 2026	Embassy	
Cape Verde	List	José Luis do Livramento Monteiro Alves De Brito	December 23, 2020	Embassy	
Central African Republic	List	Martial Ndoubou	September 17, 2018	Embassy	
Chad	List	Gata Kitoko	June 30, 2023	Embassy	
Chile	List	Juan Gabriel Valdés	June 7, 2022	Embassy	
China	List	Xie Feng	June 30, 2023	Embassy	
Colombia	List	Luis Gilberto Murillo	September 16, 2022	Embassy	
Comoros	List	Issimail Chanfi	December 23, 2020		
Democratic Republic of the Congo	List	Marie-Hélène Mathey-Boo	June 7, 2022	Embassy	
Republic of the Congo	List	Serge Mombouli	July 31, 2001	Embassy	
Costa Rica		Catalina Crespo Sancho	April 19, 2023	Embassy	
Croatia	List	Pjer Šimunović	September 8, 2017	Embassy	
Cuba	List	Vacant; Lianys Torres Rivera, chargé d'affaires a.i.	January 14, 2021	Embassy	
Cyprus	List	Marios Lysiotis	September 17, 2018	Embassy	
Czech Republic	List	Miloslav Stašek	September 16, 2022	Embassy	
Denmark	List	Jesper Møller Sørensen	September 16, 2022	Embassy	
Djibouti	List	Mohamed Siad Douale	January 28, 2016	Embassy	
Dominica	List	Vacant; Judith-Anne Rolle, chargé d'affaires a.i.	December 16, 2021	Embassy	
Dominican Republic	List	Sonia Guzmán De Hernández	January 18, 2021	Embassy	
Ecuador		Ivonne Leila Juez De A-Baki	February 6, 2020	Embassy	
Egypt		Motaz Mounir Zahran	September 17, 2020	Embassy	
El Salvador		Milena Mayorga	December 23, 2020	Embassy	
Equatorial Guinea		Miguel Ntutumu Evuna Andeme	February 23, 2015	Embassy	
Eritrea	List	Vacant; Berhane Gebrehiwet Solomon, chargé d'affaires a.i.	March 15, 2011	Embassy	
Estonia	List	Kristjan Prikk	July 7, 2021	Embassy	
Eswatini	List	Kennedy Fitzgerald Groening	June 7, 2022	Embassy	
Ethiopia	List	Seleshi Bekele Awulachew	June 7, 2022	Embassy	
European Union	List	Stavros Lambrinidis	April 8, 2019	Embassy	
Fiji	List	Vacant		Embassy	
Finland	List	Leena-Kaisa Mikkola	September 2024	Embassy	
France	List	Laurent Bili	April 19, 2023	Embassy	
Gabon	List	Noel Nelson Messone	December 12, 2022	Embassy	
The Gambia	List	Momodou Lamin Bah	December 12, 2022	Embassy	
Georgia	List	David Zalkaliani	June 7, 2022	Embassy	
Germany	List	Emily Haber	June 22, 2018	Embassy	
Ghana	List	Alima Mahama	July 7, 2021	Embassy	
Greece	List	Alexandra Papadopoulou	February 6, 2020	Embassy	
Grenada	List	Yolande Yvonne Smith	April 8, 2019	Embassy	
Guatemala	List	Alfonso José Quinonez Lemus	July 17, 2020	Embassy	
Guinea	List	Fatoumata Kaba	April 19, 2023	Embassy	
Guinea-Bissau	List	Vacant			
Guyana	List	Samuel Archibald Hinds	July 7, 2021	Embassy	
Haiti	List	Vacant; Louis Harold Joseph, chargé d'affaires a.i.	May 15, 2023	Embassy	
Holy See	List	Christophe Pierre	June 27, 2016	Embassy	
Honduras		Javier Efrain Bu Soto	December 12, 2022	Embassy	
Hungary	List	Szabolcs Ferenc Takacs	December 23, 2020	Embassy	
Iceland	List	Bergdís Ellertsdóttir	September 16, 2019	Embassy	
India	List	Vinay Mohan Kwatra	February 6, 2024	Embassy	
Indonesia		Rosan Roeslani	January 13, 2022	Embassy	
Iran	List	The United States does not maintain diplomatic relations with Iran. The Iran interests section of the Embassy of Pakistan represents Iran's interests			
Iraq		Nazar Issa Abdulhadi Al-Khirullah	June 30, 2023	Embassy	
Ireland	List	Geraldine Byrne Nason	September 16, 2022	Embassy	
Israel	List	Yechiel Leiter	January 24, 2025	Embassy	
Italy	List	Mariangela Zappia	September 15, 2021	Embassy	
Ivory Coast	List	Ibrahima Touré	January 13, 2022	Embassy	
Jamaica		Audrey Marks	January 18, 2017	Embassy	
Japan	List	Shigeo Yamada	October 24, 2023	Embassy	
Jordan	List	Dina Kawar	June 27, 2016	Embassy	
Kazakhstan	List	Yerzhan Ashikbayev	July 7, 2021	Embassy	
Kenya	List	Lazarus Ombai Amayo	July 17, 2020	Embassy	
Kiribati	List	Teburoro Tito	January 24, 2018		
Kosovo	List	Ilir Dugolli	January 13, 2022	Embassy	
Kuwait	List	Al-Zain Sabah Al-Naser Al-Sabah	April 19, 2023	Embassy	
Kyrgyzstan	List	Baktybek Amanbaev	July 7, 2021	Embassy	
Laos	List	Sisavath Inphachanh	June 7, 2022	Embassy	
Latvia	List	Māris Selga	September 16, 2019	Embassy	
Lebanon	List	Vacant; Wael Hachem, chargé d'affaires a.i.	March 15, 2021	Embassy	
Lesotho	List	Tumisang Mosotho	September 16, 2022	Embassy	
Liberia	List	Jeff Gongoer Dowana	December 12, 2022	Embassy	
Libya		Vacant; Khaled Daief, chargé d'affaires a.i.	August 27, 2021	Embassy	
Liechtenstein	List	Georg Sparber	December 1, 2021	Embassy	
Lithuania	List	Audra Plepytė	July 7, 2021	Embassy	
Luxembourg	List	Nicole Bintner	September 15, 2021	Embassy	
Madagascar	List	Vacant; Amielle Pelenne Niriniavisoa Marceda, chargé d'affaires a.i.	October 31, 2019	Embassy	
Malawi	List	Esme Jynet Chombo	April 19, 2022	Embassy	
Malaysia	List	Mohamed Nazri Bin Abdul Aziz	April 19, 2023	Embassy	
Maldives	List	Abdul Ghafoor Mohamed	December 12, 2022		
Mali	List	Sékou Berthe	September 16, 2022	Embassy	
Malta	List	Godfrey C. Xuereb	April 19, 2023	Embassy	
Marshall Islands	List	Gerald Zackios	September 16, 2016	Embassy	
Mauritania	List	Boide Cisse	September 15, 2021	Embassy	
Mauritius	List	Purmanund Jhugroo	July 7, 2021	Embassy	
Mexico	List	Esteban Moctezuma	April 20, 2021	Embassy	
Federated States of Micronesia	List	Vacant; Jackson Soram, chargé d'affaires a.i.	March 31, 2023	Embassy	
Moldova	List	Viorel Ursu	December 12, 2022	Embassy	
Monaco	List	Maguy Maccario Doyle	December 3, 2013	Embassy	
Mongolia	List	Batbayaru lziidelger	December 1, 2021	Embassy	
Montenegro	List	Vacant; Nebojsa Todorovic, chargé d'affaires a.i.	December 7, 2022	Embassy	
Morocco		Lalla Joumala Alaoui	April 24, 2017	Embassy	
Mozambique	List	Alfredo Fabaio Nuvunga	April 19, 2023	Embassy	
Myanmar	List	Vacant; Win Thet, chargé d'affaires a.i.	June 22, 2022	Embassy	
Namibia	List	Margareth Natalie Mensah-Williams	January 18, 2021	Embassy	
Nauru	List	Margo Deiye	December 1, 2021		
Nepal	List	Sridhar Khatri	April 19, 2022	Embassy	
Netherlands	List	Andre Haspels	September 16, 2019	Embassy	
New Zealand	List	Bede Gilbert Corry	September 16, 2022	Embassy	
Nicaragua	List	Francisco Campbell	June 28, 2010	Embassy	
Niger	List	Mamadou Kiari Liman-Tinguiri	April 19, 2022	Embassy	
Nigeria		Uzoma Elizabeth Emenike	July 7, 2021	Embassy	
North Korea		The United States does not maintain diplomatic relations with North Korea.			
North Macedonia	List	Zoran Popov	September 16, 2022	Embassy	
Norway	List	Anniken Ramberg Krutnes	September 17, 2020	Embassy	
Oman	List	Moosa Hamdan Moosa Al Tai	February 17, 2021	Embassy	
Pakistan	List	Sardar Masood Khan	April 19, 2022	Embassy	
Palau	List	Hersey Kyota	November 12, 1997	Embassy	
Panama		Ramón Eduardo Martínez De La Guardia	September 16, 2022	Embassy	
Papua New Guinea	List	Vacant; Cephas Kayo, chargé d'affaires a.i.	January 31, 2018	Embassy	
Paraguay	List	José Antonio Dos Santos Bedoya	September 15, 2021	Embassy	
Peru	List	Gustavo Adolfo Meza Cuadra Velásquez	June 30, 2023	Embassy	
Philippines	List	Jose Manuel Del Gallego Romualdez	November 29, 2017	Embassy	
Poland	List	Marek Grzegorz Magierowski	January 13, 2022	Embassy	
Portugal	List	Francisco António Duarte Lopes	June 7, 2022	Embassy	
Qatar	List	Meshal bin Hamad Al Thani	April 24, 2017	Embassy	
Romania	List	Dan Andrei Muraru	Embassy		
Russia	List	Alexander Darchiev	March 6, 2025	Embassy	
Rwanda	List	Mathilde Mukantabana	July 18, 2013	Embassy	
Saint Kitts and Nevis	List	Vacant; Shanelle Natasha Simmonds, chargé d'affaires a.i.	August 26, 2022	Embassy	
Saint Lucia	List	Elizabeth Darius-Clarke	June 7, 2022	Embassy	
Saint Vincent and the Grenadines	List	Lou-Anne Gaylene Gilchrist	January 18, 2017	Embassy	
Samoa	List	Pa’olelei Luteru	July 7, 2021		
San Marino		Damiano Beleffi	July 21, 2017		
São Tomé and Príncipe	List	Vacant			
Saudi Arabia	List	Reema bint Bandar Al Saud	July 8, 2019	Embassy	
Senegal	List	Mansour Kane	January 6, 2020	Embassy	
Serbia	List	Dragan Šutanovac	January 18, 2021	Embassy	
Seychelles	List	Ian Dereck Joseph Madeleine	December 1, 2021		
Sierra Leone	List	Sidique Abou Bakarr Wai	April 8, 2019	Embassy	
Singapore	List	Lui Tuck Yew	June 30, 2023	Embassy	
Slovakia	List	Radovan Javorčík	January 18, 2021	Embassy	
Slovenia	List	Vacant; Darja Ferlez, chargé d'affaires a.i.	June 5, 2023	Embassy	
Solomon Islands	List	Jane Mugafalu Kabui Waetara	September 16, 2022		
Somalia	List	Ali Sharif Ahmed	September 16, 2019	Embassy	
South Africa	List	Nomaindiya Mfeketo	April 8, 2020	Embassy	
South Korea	List	Kang Kyung-wha	October 6, 2025	Embassy	
South Sudan	List	Philip Jada Natana	September 17, 2018	Embassy	
Spain	List	Ángeles Moreno Bau	January 18, 2024	Embassy	
Sri Lanka	List	Mahinda Samarasinghe	January 13, 2022	Embassy	
Sudan	List	Mohamed Abdalla Idris Mohamed	September 16, 2022	Embassy	
Suriname	List	Jan Marten Willem Schalkwijk	April 19, 2022	Embassy	
Sweden	List	Urban Ahlin	September 8, 2017	Embassy	
Switzerland	List	Jacques Henri Pitteloud	September 16, 2019	Embassy	
Syria	List	Vacant		Embassy	
Tajikistan	List	Farrukh Hamralizoda	February 17, 2021	Embassy	
Tanzania	List	Elsie Sia Kanza	December 1, 2021	Embassy	
Thailand	List	Tanee Sangrat	December 12, 2022	Embassy	
Timor-Leste		Vacant; Antonito De Araujo, chargé d'affaires a.i.	February 24, 2023	Embassy	
Togo	List	Frédéric Edem Hegbe	April 24, 2017	Embassy	
Tonga	List	Viliana Va’inga Tonē	April 20, 2021		
Trinidad and Tobago	List	Anthony Wayne Jerome Phillips Spencer	June 27, 2016	Embassy	
Tunisia	List	Hanene Tajouribessassi	December 1, 2021	Embassy	
Turkey	List	Hasan Murat Mercan	April 20, 2021	Embassy	
Turkmenistan	List	Meret Orazov	February 14, 2001	Embassy	
Tuvalu	List	Tapuago Falefou	April 19, 2023		
Uganda		Robinah Kakonge	December 12, 2022	Embassy	
Ukraine	List	Oksana Markarova	July 7, 2021	Embassy	
United Arab Emirates		Yousef Al Otaiba	July 28, 2008	Embassy	
United Kingdom	List	Christian Turner	February 2, 2026	Embassy	
Uruguay	List	Andrés Augusto Durán Hareau	December 23, 2020	Embassy	
Uzbekistan	List	Furkat Sidikov	April 19, 2023	Embassy	
Vanuatu		Odo Tevi	September 8, 2017		
Venezuela		Vacant		Embassy	
Vietnam	List	Nguyen Quoc Dung	April 19, 2022	Embassy	
Yemen	List	Mohammed Abdullah Mohammed Al-Hadhrami	June 7, 2022	Embassy	
Zambia	List	Chibamba Kanyama	June 30, 2023	Embassy	
Zimbabwe	List	Tadeous Tafirenyika Chifamba	July 7, 2021	Embassy	

== See also ==
- Ambassadors of the United States
