= List of ambassadors of Solomon Islands to the United States =

Coordinates: 40.750070°N 73.971644°W

Ambassador of Solomon Islands to the United States
- Incumbent; Jane Waetara since 2022
- Inaugural holder: Francis Bugotu
- Formation: March 30, 1979

The Solomon Islands Ambassador in New York City is the official representative of the Government in Honiara to the Government of the United States and also Permanent Representative to the Headquarters of the United Nations.

== List of representatives ==
Diplomatic agreement	Diplomatic accreditation	Ambassador	Observations	Prime Minister of Solomon Islands	President of the United States	Term end
September 23, 1978	March 30, 1979	Francis Bugotu	Resident in Honiara (* June 27, 1937 in Guadalcanal July 9, 1992): educated at St. Mary's School at Maravovo (q.v.) on Guadalcanal, and All Hallows' School	Peter Kenilorea	Jimmy Carter	
December 10, 1984	January 15, 1985	Francis Saemala	(* June 23, 1944 in Ambu/Malaita): From 1994 – 1996 he was Foreign minister.	Peter Kenilorea	Ronald Reagan	
February 5, 1990	February 19, 1991	Francis Bugotu	c.b.e., m.a. (* June 27, 1937 Guadalcanal) Solomon Islands educationist, civil servant and diplomatist, was the first Solomon Islands graduate, having studied linguistics at Lancaster University in the UK.: married 2 children.; Education: New Zealand, Australia, Scotland and England.; Teacher and Inspector of Mission Schools (1959–60); lecturer at the Solomon Island Teachers College lecturer at the Solomons	Solomon Mamaloni	George H. W. Bush	January 20, 1993
February 5, 1997	February 11, 1997	Rex Stephen Horoi	(*September 8, 1954 in Tawatana, Makira-Ulawa Province San Cristobal Solomon Islands) Teacher, Education: King George VI High School (1970–74) Scout Leader, Solomon University of the South Pacific (1975–77). Careen Teacher, head of Sports Department and Physical Education Program, Tenaru School. Mem- ben Member of the Solomon Islands English Panel for Secondary School Curriculum	Solomon Mamaloni	Bill Clinton	January 20, 2001
February 24, 2004	March 31, 2004	Colin Beck		Allan Kemakeza	George W. Bush	January 20, 2009
2022	2022	Jane Waetara		Manasseh Sogavare	Joe Biden	

United States–Solomon Islands relations
