= Lebogang =

Lebogang or Lebohang is a South African given name which is often shortened to Lebo. It may refer to:

- Lebogang Mabatle (born 1992), South African football defender;
- Lebogang Mahlangu (born 1997), South African scientist and model;
- Lebogang Manyama (born 1990), South African footballer;
- Lebogang Mashile (born 1979), South African actor, writer and poet;
- Lebohang Mokoena (born 1986), South African football player;
- Lebohang K. Moleko, Lesotho diplomat;
- Lebogang Moloto (born 1992), South African footballer;
- Lebo M (Lebohang Morake, born 1964), South African producer and composer;
- Lebogang Morula (born 1968), South African football player;
- Lebo Mothiba (born 1996), South African footballer;
- Lebogang Phiri (born 1994), South African footballer;
- Lebogang Ramalepe (born 1991), South African football defender;
- Lebohang Raputsoe (born 1999), South African beauty pageant titleholder;
- Lebogang Shange (born 1990), South African race walker;
- Lebo Mathosa (born 1977), South African singer.
