= Dominicans in the United States =

Dominicans in the United States can refer to:

- Dominican American (Dominican Republic), inhabitants of the United States with origins in the Dominican Republic
- Dominican American (Dominica), inhabitants of the United States with origins in Dominica
- Dominican Order in the United States, members of the Dominican Order
