= Alcide Djédjé =

Ivorian diplomat

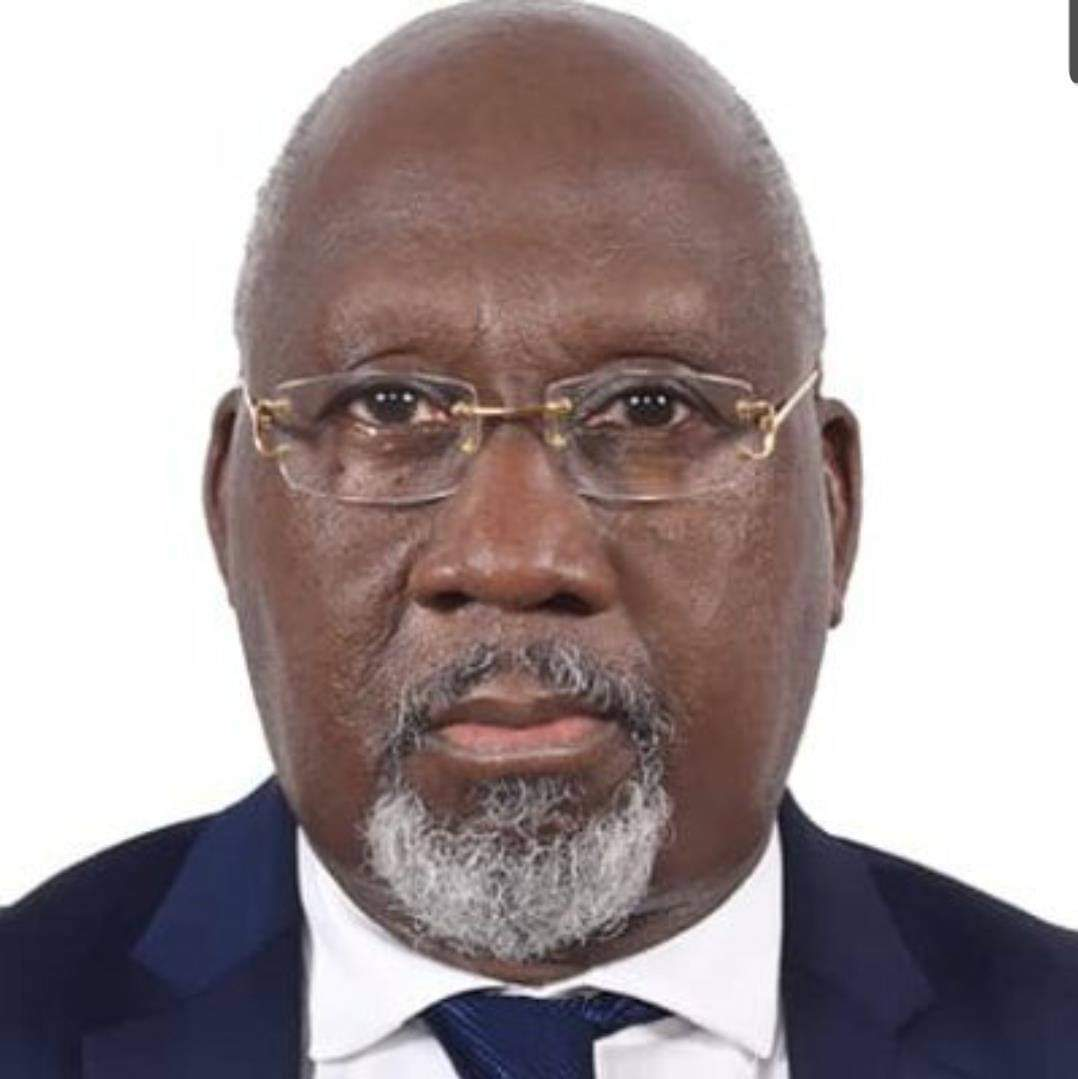
Alcide Djédjé

Ilahiri Alcide Djédjé (born 1956) is an Ivorian diplomat who was the Permanent Representative of Ivory Coast to the United Nations from 2007 to 2010. He was succeeded by Youssoufou Bamba.

== Education ==
Djédjé graduated from the National School of Administration of Abidjan and from the Lyon Institute of Political Studies Sciences Po Lyon.

== Career ==
He held posts at the Ivorian Ministry of Foreign Affairs from 1987 to 1994. He was First Secretary and Consul at the Ivorian Embassy in South Africa from 1994 to 2000, then returned to the Ministry of Foreign Affairs as assistant director of diplomatic privileges and immunities, holding that post from 2002 to 2005.

In January 2005, Djédjé was appointed as Special Adviser of President Laurent Gbagbo. After two years in that post, he became Permanent Representative to the UN, presenting his credentials on January 11, 2007.
