= Hunaina al-Mughairy =

Ambassador

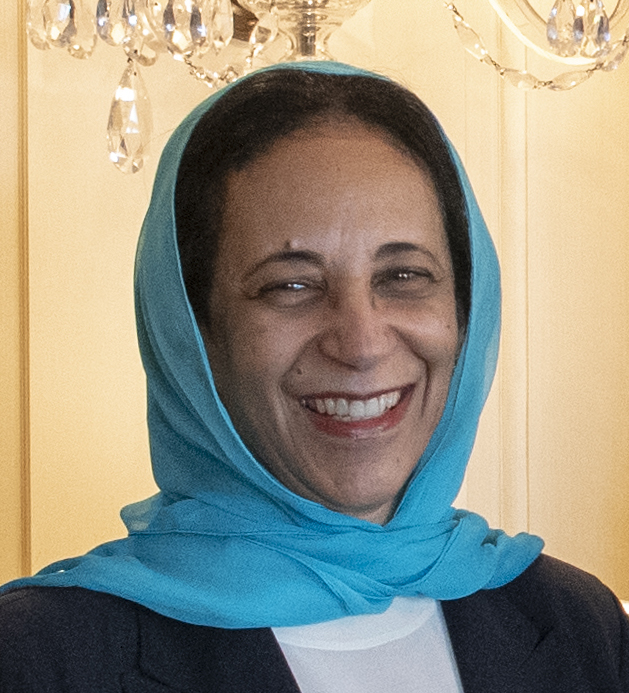
- Al-Mughairy in 2020

Omani Ambassador to the United States
- In office November 9, 2005 – December 3, 2020
- Preceded by: Mohammed Bin Ali Bin Xhani

Personal details
- Born: October 13, 1948 (age 77) Dar es Salaam, Tanzania
- Children: 2
- Education: New York University

Hunaina Al-Mughairy (Arabic: حنينة المغيرية; born October 13, 1948) is an Omani economist and diplomat.

== Career ==
Al-Mughairy studied a bachelors degree in Business Communications at the High Politechnical Institute in Cairo, Egypt. She then attended New York University, where she earned a master's degree in Economics.

Al-Mughairy was Economic Advisor to the Sultan of Oman from 1973 to 1974, then worked as Director of industrial loans and grants in the Ministry of Commerce and Industry from 1979 to 1984.

Al-Mughairy worked in the Permanent Mission of Oman to the United Nations Office at Geneva from 1984 to 1985.

Al-Mughairy was appointed the ambassador of the Sultanate of Oman to the United States from 2005 to 2020. By 2020, Al-Mughairy was also non-resident ambassador to Canada, Cuba and Mexico. She was the first woman to be nominated Ambassador of Oman to Washington D.C., as well as the first woman ambassador to the US from an Arab nation. As Ambassador, Al-Mughairy also served as Chair at the Sultan Qaboos Cultural Center in Washington D.C. and advocated for the US-Oman Free Trade Agreement.

Al-Mughairy was elected member of the Cosmos Club of Washington DC.

== Personal life ==
Al-Mughairy is married to Fuad Mubarak al-Hinai, the Omani Ambassador to the United Nations from August 1998. They have two children together.

== See also ==
- Embassy of Oman
