= List of ambassadors of Lesotho to the United States =

Coordinates: 38°54′57.5″N 77°3′19.4″W

Ambassador of Lesotho to the United States Embassy of Lesotho in Washington, D.C.
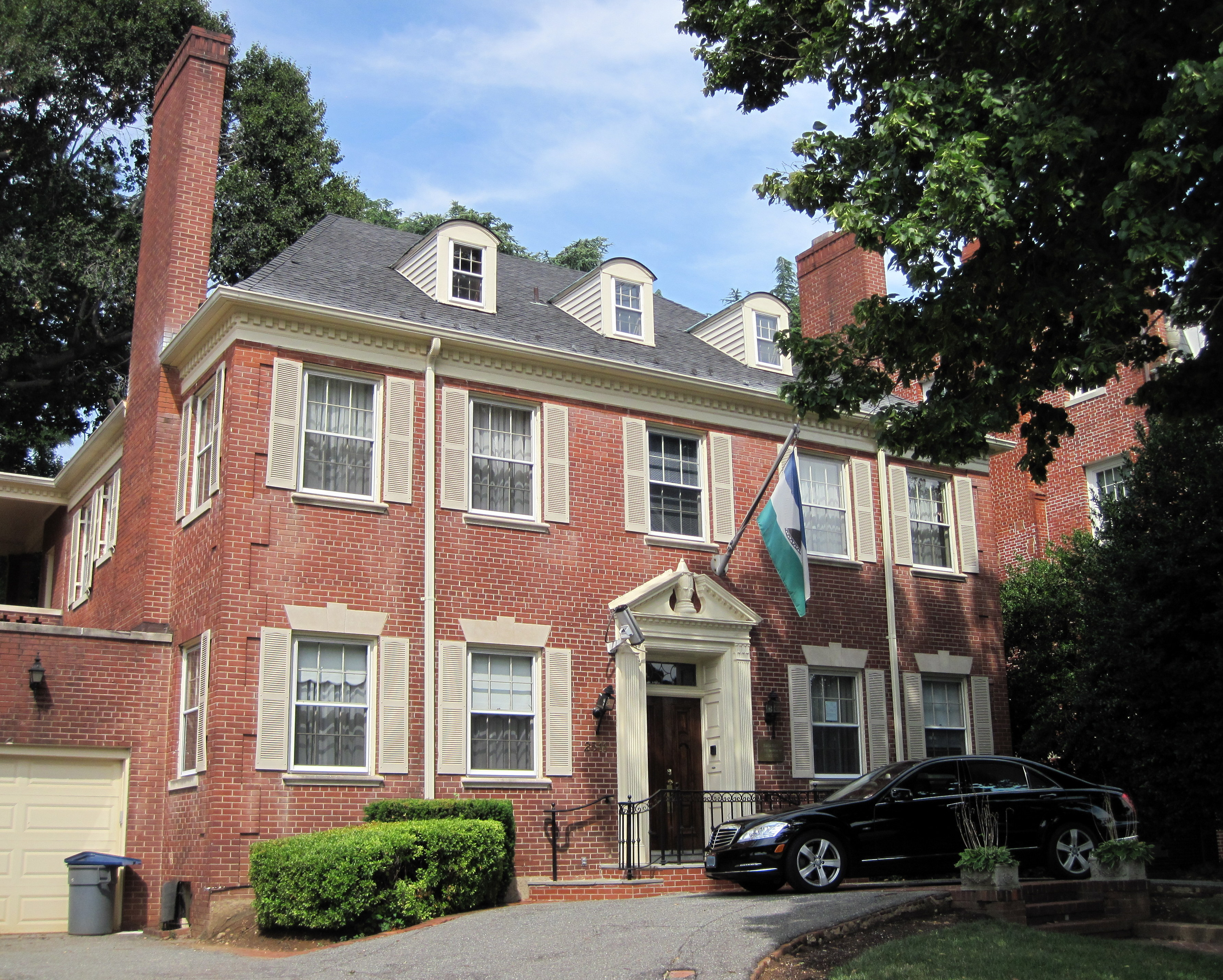
- Incumbent; Gabriel Sankatana Maja since June 22, 2018
- Inaugural holder: Albert Steerforth Mohale
- Formation: December 14, 1966

The Mosotho ambassador in Washington, D. C. is the official representative of the Government in Maseru to the Government of the United States.

== List of representatives ==
Diplomatic agrément	Diplomatic accreditation	Ambassador	Observations	List of monarchs of Lesotho	List of presidents of the United States	Term end
December 6, 1966	December 14, 1966	Albert Steerforth Mohale	born on April 26, 1928, in Mohale's Hoek.	Moshoeshoe II of Lesotho	Lyndon B. Johnson	
April 14, 1969	April 17, 1969	Mothusi Thansango Mashologu		Moshoeshoe II of Lesotho	Richard Nixon	
June 24, 1973		Konka Consalo Molapo	Chargé d'affaires	Moshoeshoe II of Lesotho	Richard Nixon	
August 22, 1973	November 9, 1973	Ephraim Tsepa Manare		Moshoeshoe II of Lesotho	Richard Nixon	
August 12, 1975	September 3, 1975	Teboho John Mashologu		Moshoeshoe II of Lesotho	Gerald Ford	
July 15, 1976		Noto Ketso David	Agreement granted, Nomination subsequently withdrawn	Moshoeshoe II of Lesotho	Gerald Ford	
August 16, 1976		John B. Maieane	Chargé d'affaires	Moshoeshoe II of Lesotho	Gerald Ford	
September 14, 1976	November 24, 1976	Thabo R. Makeka	born on June 11, 1947, in Qaeha's Nek, Lesotho.	Moshoeshoe II of Lesotho	Gerald Ford	
January 25, 1979		John B. Maieane	Chargé d'affaires	Moshoeshoe II of Lesotho	Jimmy Carter	
March 6, 1979	March 30, 1979	Timothy Thahane Thahane		Moshoeshoe II of Lesotho	Jimmy Carter	
March 21, 1980	April 24, 1980	Cecilia Mildred Nana Tau		Moshoeshoe II of Lesotho	Jimmy Carter	
September 12, 1985	November 5, 1985	Abel Leshele Thoahlane		Moshoeshoe II of Lesotho	Ronald Reagan	
May 27, 1986	June 23, 1986	William Thabo Van Tonder		Moshoeshoe II of Lesotho	Ronald Reagan	
September 24, 1991	October 1, 1991	Tseliso Thamae		Moshoeshoe II of Lesotho	George H. W. Bush	
January 12, 1993	April 14, 1993	Teboho Ephraim Kitleli		Moshoeshoe II of Lesotho	Bill Clinton	
January 30, 1995		Eunice Mangoaela Bulane		Moshoeshoe II of Lesotho	Bill Clinton	
September 9, 1999	November 29, 1999	Lebohang K. Moleko		Letsie III of Lesotho	Bill Clinton	
December 27, 2001	February 14, 2002	Molelekeng Rapolaki		Letsie III of Lesotho	George W. Bush	
June 2, 2008	June 6, 2008	David Mohlomi Rantekoa		Letsie III of Lesotho	George W. Bush	
November 2, 2011	January 18, 2012	Eliachim Molapi Sebatane		Letsie III of Lesotho	Barack Obama	
April 19, 2018	June 22, 2018	Gabriel Sankatana Maja		Letsie III of Lesotho	Donald John Trump	
June 8, 2022	December 2025	Tumisang Mosotho		Letsie III of Lesotho	Donald John Trump	
