= List of ambassadors of Mozambique to the United States =

Ambassador of Mozambique to the United States Embassy of Mozambique in Washington, D.C.
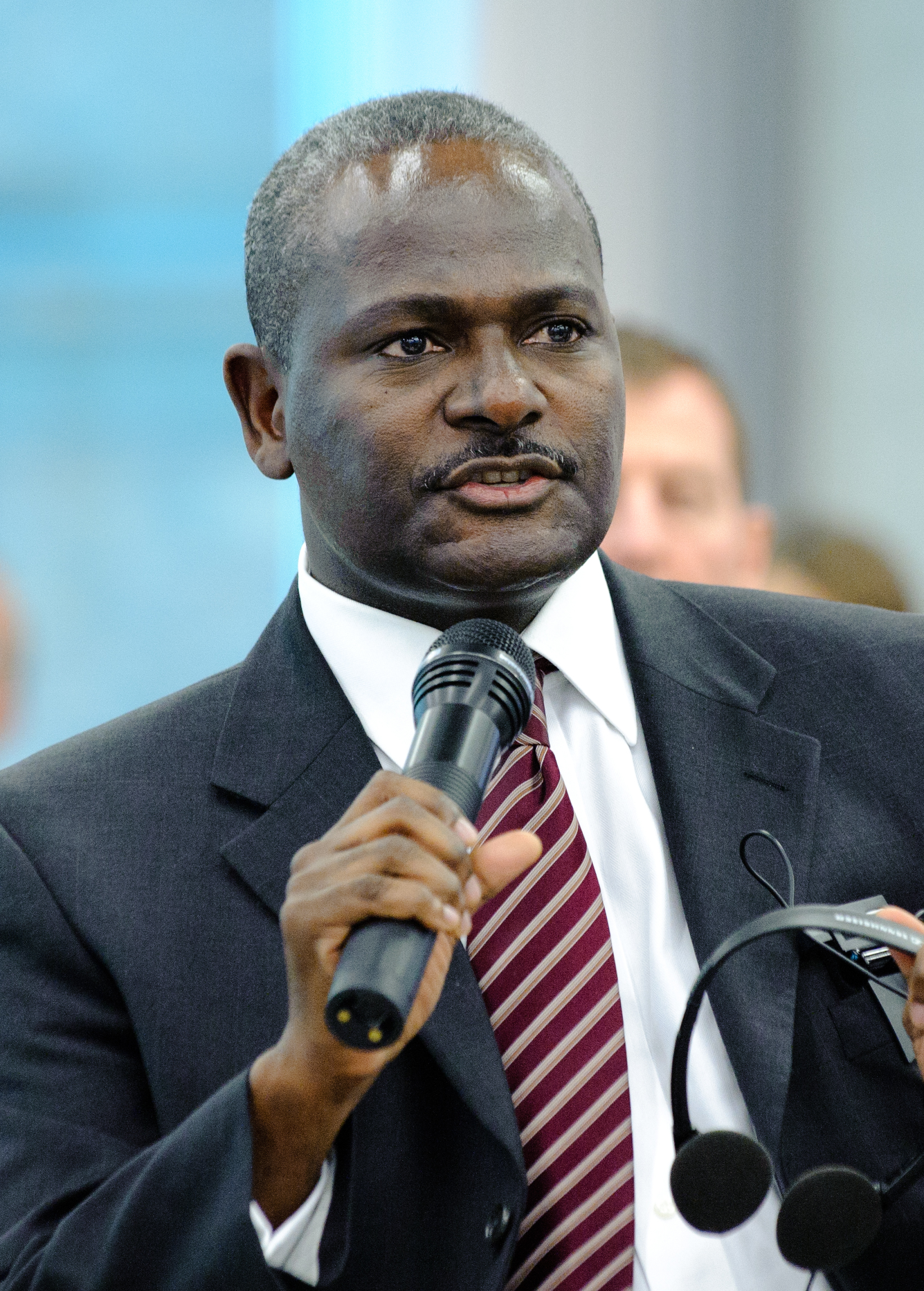
- Incumbent; Carlos dos Santos since January 28, 2016
- Inaugural holder: Valeriano Inocencio de Araujo Ferrao
- Formation: January 9, 1984

The Mozambican ambassador in Washington, D. C. is the official representative of the Government in Maputo to the Government of the United States.

== List of representatives ==
Diplomatic agrément	Diplomatic accreditation	ambassador	Observations	List of heads of state of Mozambique	List of presidents of the United States	Term end
June 25, 1975			Mozambican Independence	Samora Machel	Gerald Ford	
September 23, 1975			The governments of Samora Machel and Gerald Ford established diplomatic relations.	Samora Machel	Gerald Ford	
December 7, 1983	January 9, 1984	Valeriano Inocencio de Araujo Ferrao	(*October 11, 1939 in Beira, Mozambique): Son of Tomas Antonio and Cristina Joana (Araujo) Ferrao	Samora Machel	Ronald Reagan	
January 12, 1990			The states constitution changed the name from People's Republic of Mozambique to Republic of Mozambique.	Joaquim Alberto Chissano	George H. W. Bush	
March 5, 1991	April 11, 1991	Hipolito Pereira Zozimo Patricio	(* September 3, 1954 in Mozambique)	Joaquim Alberto Chissano	George H. W. Bush	
June 11, 1996	July 29, 1996	Marcos Geraldo Namashulua	(*18 December 1942 in Marracuene District in the province of Maputo)	Joaquim Alberto Chissano	Bill Clinton	
January 14, 2002	February 14, 2002	Armando Alexandre Panguene	In 2004 he was High Commissioner (Commonwealth) in Pretoria.	Joaquim Alberto Chissano	George W. Bush	
November 2, 2009	November 4, 2009	Amelia Narciso Matos Sumbana	Sentenced to ten years for misuse of funds	Armando Guebuza	Barack Obama	2015
October 26, 2015	January 28, 2016	Carlos dos Santos	(* 8 July 1961 in Manhica, Maputo Province in Maputo): From 1984 to 1989 he was first-secretary charge d'affaires in Harare.; From 1980 to 1982 he was protocol officer.; From May 2006 to 2011 he was ambassador in Berlin.; From 2011 to 2015 he was High Commissioner (Commonwealth) in London.	Filipe Nyusi	Barack Obama	
