= Banny deBrum =

Marshallese diplomat

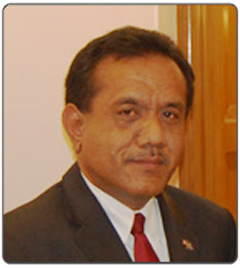
Ambassador Banny deBrum

Banny deBrum (pronounced Der-Broom; 1956 – March 16, 2011) was the ambassador of the Republic of the Marshall Islands to the United States until his death in March 2011.

He assumed his role as ambassador in 1996 (with a hiatus in 2008–2009). Banny de Brum graduated from Regis University (Denver, Colorado) in 1981 with a B.A. in sociology. He was later assigned to the Republic of the Marshall Islands (RMI) Embassy in Washington in 1987 as Deputy Chief of Mission. In 1995, he became Chargé d'Affaires when Ambassador Wilfred Kendall resigned to seek a seat in the RMI parliament.

He has also served as Acting Permanent Representative in the absence of the RMI Ambassador to the United Nations.

Since 1994, he has served as the Chairman of the Washington Pacific Committee. This committee, composed of representatives of all Pacific Embassies including the three Freely Associated States (Micronesia, Palau and the RMI), promotes regional, political and cultural interests in the capital.

Banny de Brum also served as High Steward and chairman of the Board of Advisors for EUCLID (Euclid University) between 2009 and 2011.

He died in Honolulu, Hawaii, in March 2011.
