= List of ambassadors of Monaco to the United States =

Coordinates: 38°54′04.0″N 77°02′23.1″W

Ambassador of Monaco to the United States Embassy of Monaco in Washington, D.C.
- Incumbent; Maguy Maccario Doyle since December 3, 2013
- Inaugural holder: Gilles Alexandre Noghès
- Formation: December 8, 2006

The Monegasque ambassador in Washington, D. C. is the official representative of Prince Albert II and the Princely Government of Monaco to the Government of the United States.

== List of representatives ==
Diplomatic agrément	Diplomatic accreditation	Ambassador	Observations	Monarch	Minister of State (Monaco)	List of presidents of the United States	Term end
November 14, 2006	December 8, 2006	Gilles Alexandre Noghès		Albert II	Jean-Paul Proust	George W. Bush Barack Obama	2010
November 26, 2013	December 3, 2013	Maguy Maccario Doyle		Albert II	Michel Roger Serge Telle	Barack Obama Donald Trump Joe Biden	2020
