= Alfredo Lopes Cabral =

Bissau-Guinean diplomat

Alfredo Lopes Cabral (born 1946) is a Guinea-Bissauan diplomat and United Nations official.

From 1983 to 1986, Cabral was the Ambassador of Guinea-Bissau to Algeria, Tunisia and various countries of South-West Asia. From 1986 to 1990 he was the Permanent Representative of Guinea-Bissau next the Headquarters of the United Nations and concurrently Bissau-Guinean Ambassador to the United States. He was also Guinea-Bissau's ambassador to the UN between 1996 and 1999. In 1996 and 1997, Cabral represented Guinea-Bissau on the Security Council, serving as its President in September 1996. Cabral was appointed to his third term as Guinea Bissau's representative to the UN in 2003.

From 1987 and 1996, Cabral was the Ambassador of Guinea-Bissau to the United States, Canada, and Mexico.

From 1999 to 2001, Cabral was the Representative of the United Nations Secretary-General in Haiti and was head of the United Nations Civilian Police Mission in Haiti (MIPONUH) and later its successor, the International Civilian Support Mission in Haiti (MICAH).
