= Embassy of Mauritania, Washington, D.C. =

Embassy of Mauritania in the USA

Embassy of Mauritania
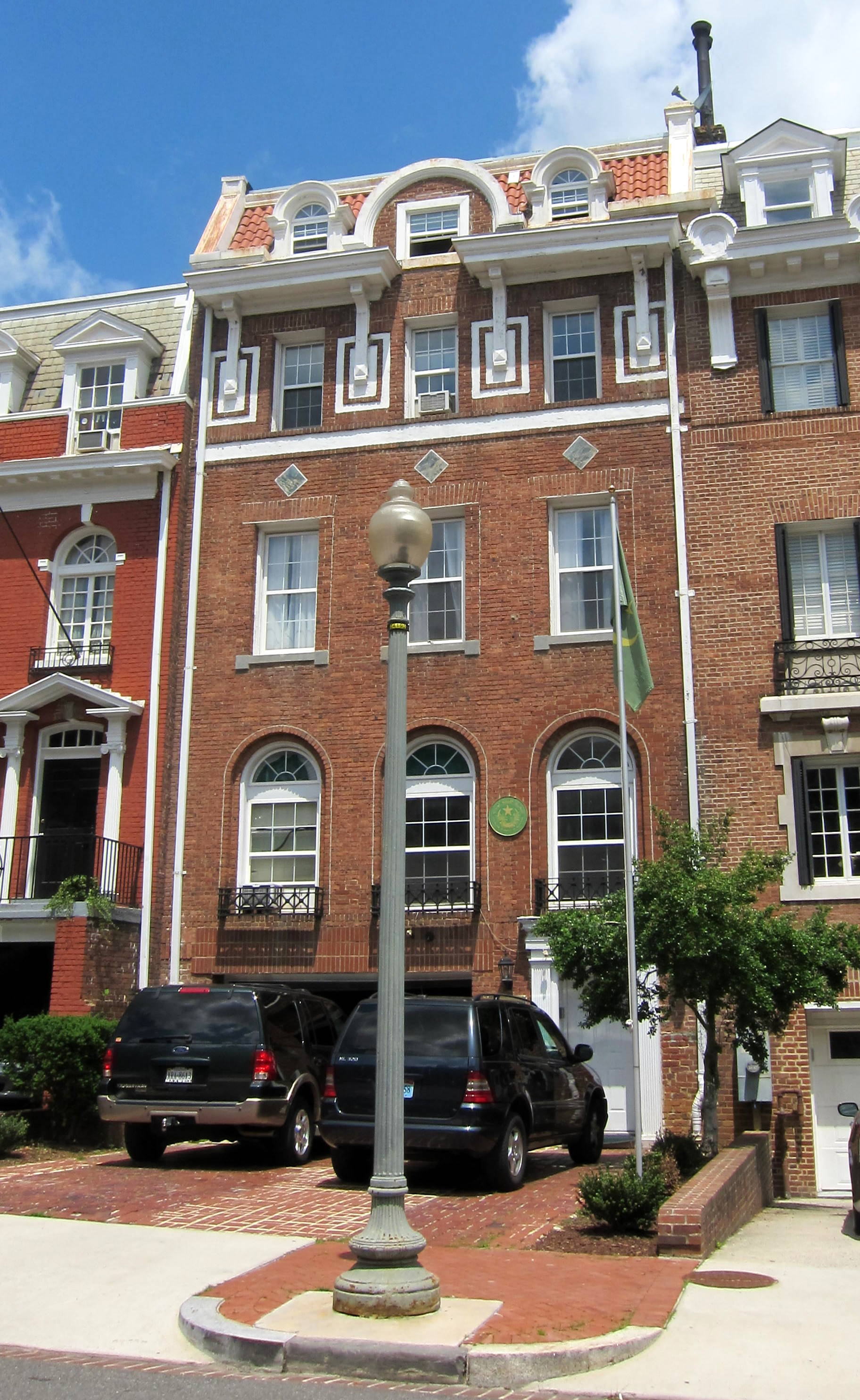
- Location: Washington, D.C.
- Address: 2129 Leroy Place, N.W.
- Coordinates: 38°54′55.58″N 77°2′51.88″W
- Ambassador: Cissé Cheikh Boide
- Website: https://mauritaniaembassyus.org

The Embassy of Mauritania in Washington, D.C. is the Islamic Republic of Mauritania's diplomatic mission to the United States. It is located at 2129 Leroy Place N.W. in Washington, D.C.'s Kalorama neighborhood.

The Ambassador is Cissé Cheikh Boide.

== Building ==
Built in 1914 as a private residence, the Georgian Revival-style building is designated as a contributing property to the Sheridan-Kalorama Historic District, listed on the National Register of Historic Places in 1989. Previous occupants include Joseph W. Folk, Charles Cheney Hyde, Frederik Wachmeister, the Embassy of Hungary, the Embassy of Libya, the Polish Trade Mission, and the Embassy of Jamaica.
