= List of ambassadors of Oman to the United States =

Coordinates: 38°55′3.6″N 77°3′21.8″W

Ambassador of Oman to the United States Embassy of Oman in Washington, D.C.
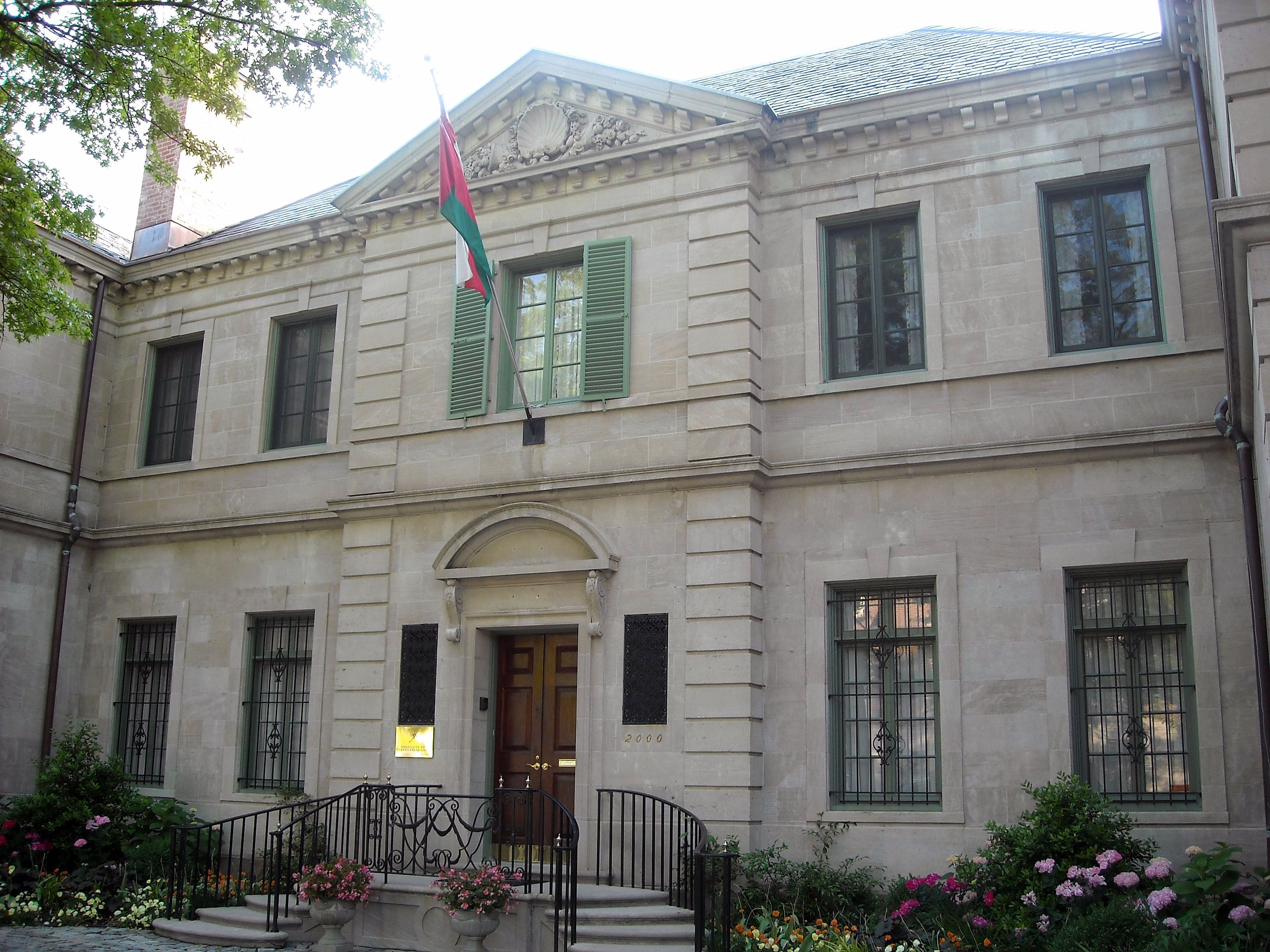
- Incumbent; Moosa Hamdan Al Tai since February 19, 2021
- Inaugural holder: Faisal bin Ali al-Bu-Sa’id
- Formation: June 14, 1973

The Omani ambassador in Washington, D. C. is the official representative of the Government in Muscat, Oman to the Government of the United States.

== List of representatives ==
Diplomatic agrément	Diplomatic accreditation	Ambassador	Observations	List of rulers of Oman	List of presidents of the United States	Term end
June 5, 1973	June 14, 1973	Faisal bin Ali al-Bu-Sa’id		Qaboos bin Said al Said	Richard Nixon	
February 18, 1974	February 1, 1974	Ahmed Macki		Qaboos bin Said al Said	Gerald Ford	
September 19, 1977	October 7, 1977	Farid Mubarak Ali Al-Hinai		Qaboos bin Said al Said	Jimmy Carter	
July 18, 1979	August 13, 1979	Sadek Jawad Sulaiman		Qaboos bin Said al Said	Jimmy Carter	
January 27, 1983		Saud Sulaiman Himyar Al-.Nabhamir	Chargé d'affaires	Qaboos bin Said al Said	Ronald Reagan	
March 15, 1983	April 7, 1983	Ali Salim Bader Al-Hinai		Qaboos bin Said al Said	Ronald Reagan	
October 26, 1987	December 21, 1987	Awadh Bin Bader Bin Murie al-Shanfari		Qaboos bin Said al Said	Ronald Reagan	
December 28, 1994	March 20, 1995	Abdulla Bin Mohamed Al-Dhahab		Qaboos bin Said al Said	Bill Clinton	
October 18, 2000	December 7, 2000	Mohammed Bin Ali Bin Xhani		Qaboos bin Said al Said	Bill Clinton	
November 9, 2005	December 2, 2005	Hunaina al-Mughairy		Qaboos bin Said al Said	George W. Bush	2020
December 3, 2020	February 19, 2021	Moosa Hamdan Al Tai		Haitham bin Tariq al Said	Joe Biden	
