= Tamaiti Willie Star =

Nauruan diplomat and politician

The Honourable Tamaiti Willie Star MP

Member of the Nauruan Parliament for Buada
- In office 1992–1995
- Preceded by: Ruben Kun
- Succeeded by: Ruben Kun

Personal details
- Born: October 1926
- Died: 26 June 2007 (aged 80)

Tamaiti Willie Star (October 1926 – 26 June 2007) was a Nauruan diplomat and politician.

== Biography ==
Star was born in October 1926. He was a member of the Iruwa tribe.

Star served on the Nauru Phosphate Corporation board of directors, and chairman of the Nauru Phosphate Royalties Trust. Star was posted in Melbourne, Australia as a welfare officer in 1968, shortly after Nauru became an independent country. He later became a representative of Nauru, before becoming the first consul-general in Melbourne from Nauru.

On 29 March 1980, Star was appointed as ambassador to the United States. He was the first to hold this position. He presented his credentials to President Jimmy Carter on 6 June 1980. In January 1981, Star was appointed as acting chief secretary of the Nauruan public service and stopped serving as consul-general to Melbourne. In the 1980s, Star was given an award by the University of the South Pacific. By 1987, Star served as consul-general in Guam. A new U. S. ambassador was appointed by Nauru in 2004.

Star was elected to represent the Buada Constituency in the Parliament of Nauru in the 1992 election. He ran for re-election in 1995, but lost. He again ran unsuccessfully in 1997 and 2000.

Star was a pastor of the Nauru Congregational Church.

Star died on 26 June 2007.
