= International Civilian Support Mission in Haiti =

The International Civilian Support Mission in Haiti (MICAH; French: Mission civile internationale d'appui en Haïti) was a United Nations peacebuilding mission in Haiti. It was established through a consensus vote of the General Assembly on 17 December 1999 (resolution A/54/193). Intended to consolidate the achievements of the OAS/UN International Civilian Mission in Haiti (MICIVIH), the United Nations Civilian Police Mission in Haiti (MIPONUH) and other missions to the country, it was headed by Alfredo Lopes Cabral of Guinea-Bissau and ran from 16 March 2000 to 6 February 2001.
