= List of ambassadors of Grenada to the United States =

Coordinates: 38.912760°N 77.040125°W

Ambassador of Grenada to the United States
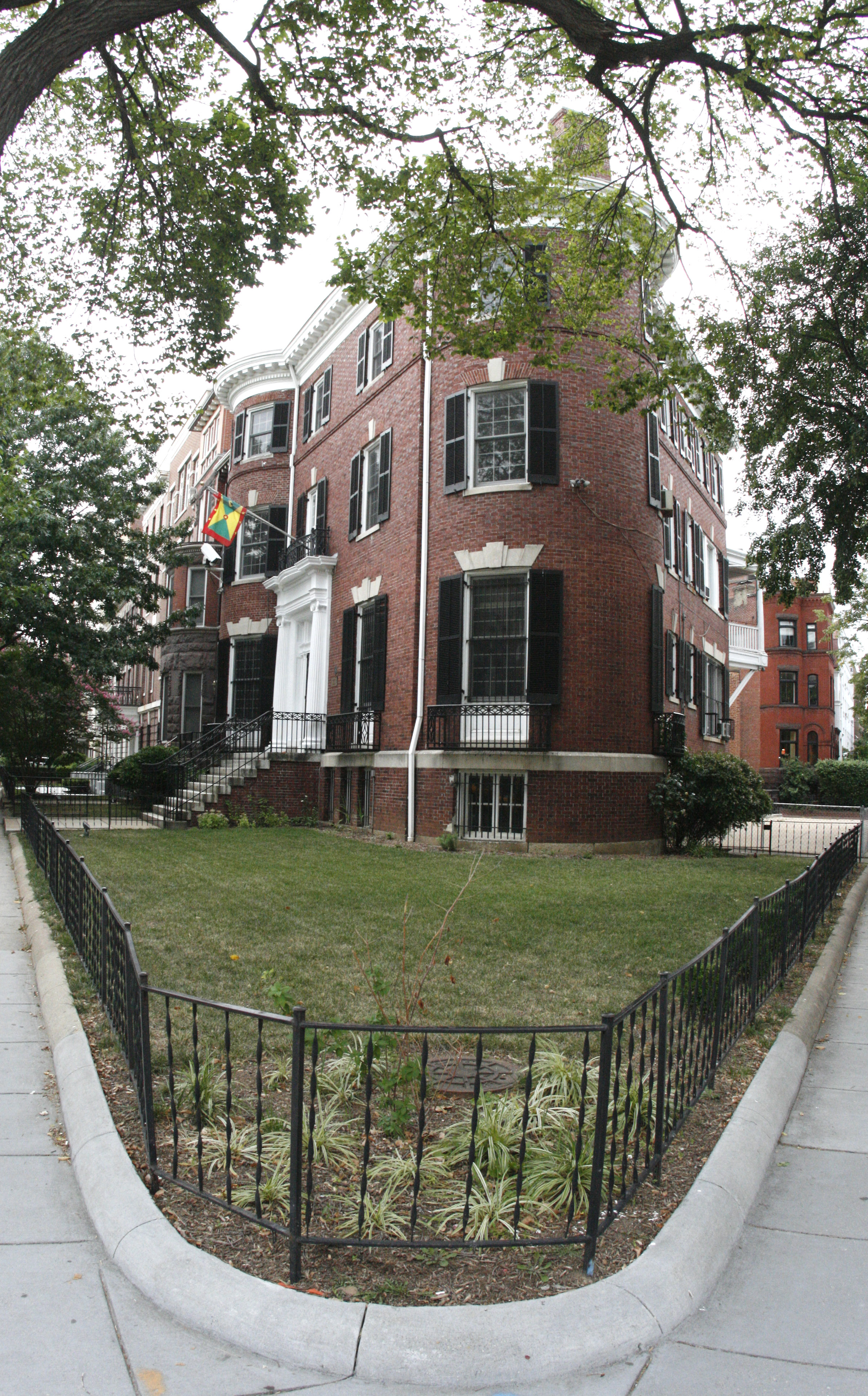
- Incumbent; Yolande Yvonne Smith since October 14, 2018
- Inaugural holder: Marie J. Mclntyre
- Formation: November 29, 1974

The Grenadian ambassador in Washington, D.C. is the official representative of the Government in St. George's, Grenada to the Government of the United States, he has regularly coacredition at the governments in, Mexico City (Mexico) and Panama City (Panama) and as Permanent Representative to the Organization of American States.

== List of representatives ==
Diplomatic Agrément	Diplomatic accreditation	Ambassador	Observations	Head of government of Grenada	President of the United States	Term end
November 23, 1974	November 29, 1974	Marie J. Mclntyre		Eric Gairy	Gerald Ford	
September 28, 1977	November 22, 1977	Franklyn O'Brien Dolland		Eric Gairy	Jimmy Carter	
August 10, 1978	October 2, 1978	George Ashley Griffith		Eric Gairy	Jimmy Carter	
July 20, 1979	August 13, 1979	Bernard Kendrick Radix		Maurice Bishop	Jimmy Carter	
May 1, 1983			No Ambassador, No Chargé d'affaires, Invasion of Grenada	Bernard Coard	Ronald Reagan	September 1, 1985
September 25, 1985	November 5, 1985	Albert Oswyn Xavier		Herbert Blaize	Ronald Reagan	
July 23, 1990	August 7, 1990	Denneth Modeste		Nicholas Brathwaite	George H. W. Bush	
May 22, 1996	July 7, 1996	Denis Godwin Antoine		Keith Mitchell	Bill Clinton	
July 17, 2009	July 20, 2009	Gillian Bristol		Tillman Thomas	Barack Obama	
September 3, 2013	September 17, 2013	Ethelstan Angus Friday		Keith Mitchell	Barack Obama	
October 14, 2018	April 10, 2019	Yolande Yvonne Smith		Keith Mitchell	Donald Trump	
