= Sultan Qaboos Cultural Center =

Omani organization in Washington, D.C.

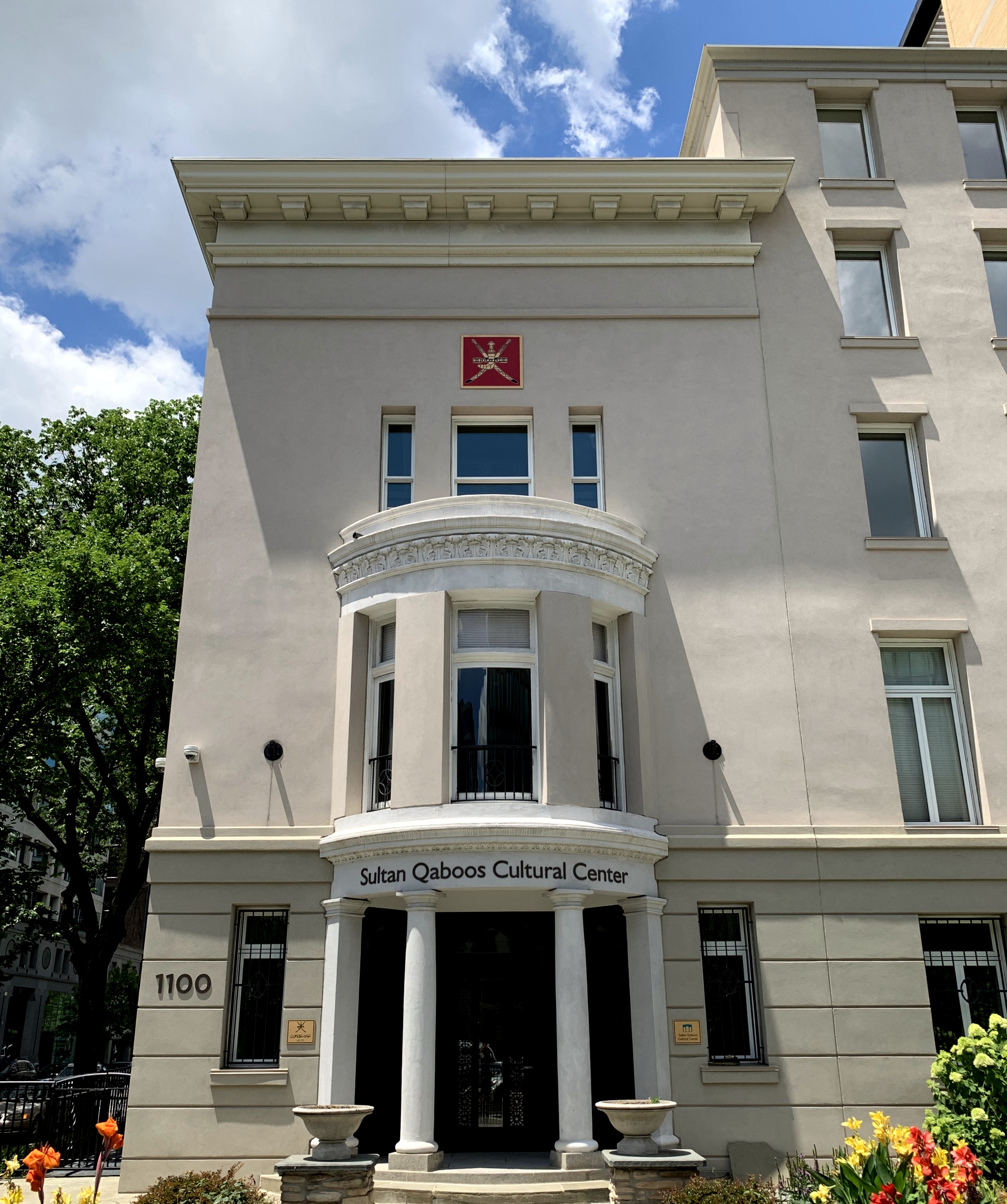
Sultan Qaboos Cultural Center on 16th Street NW in Washington, D.C.

The Sultan Qaboos Cultural Center (SQCC) is an organization based in Washington, D.C., that seeks to promote understanding of the culture and heritage of Oman and the countries of the Arabian Peninsula. Through programs in the United States and the Persian Gulf, the Center seeks to "educate a new generation of culturally sensitive and knowledgeable experts, scholars, diplomats, and politicians in each society".

SQCC's focus of education about Oman's cultural heritage is present in its programs aimed at both students and educators. SQCC has developed an interactive educational website called The Indian Ocean in World History, which tracks human interaction throughout the Indian Ocean region.

SQCC has also worked with the John F. Kennedy Center for the Performing Arts on a dance production entitled OMAN...O Man!, which featured young Omani and American dancers. This production was conceived and directed by Debbie Allen, with music by Arturo Sandoval. It was commissioned by the Kennedy Center especially for their Arabesque Festival in March 2009 and was performed during the last four days of the three-week festival. Other programs include an Arabic scholarship program and a research fellowship. Educational materials for teachers and students are also available on the SQCC website; additional cultural programs include lectures, symposia, performances, speaker tours, and cultural immersion programs. The center also offers internships for undergraduate and graduate university students.

H.E. Hunaina al-Mughairy, Ambassador of Oman to the United States, serves as Chair of the SQCC Board of Oversight. Kathleen Ridolfo serves as executive director, and Dr. Iman Al Busaidi is the deputy director in Oman.
