= List of ambassadors of Eswatini to the United States =

Coordinates: 38.913056°N 77.040556°W

Ambassador of Eswatini to the United States Embassy of Eswatini in Washington, D.C.
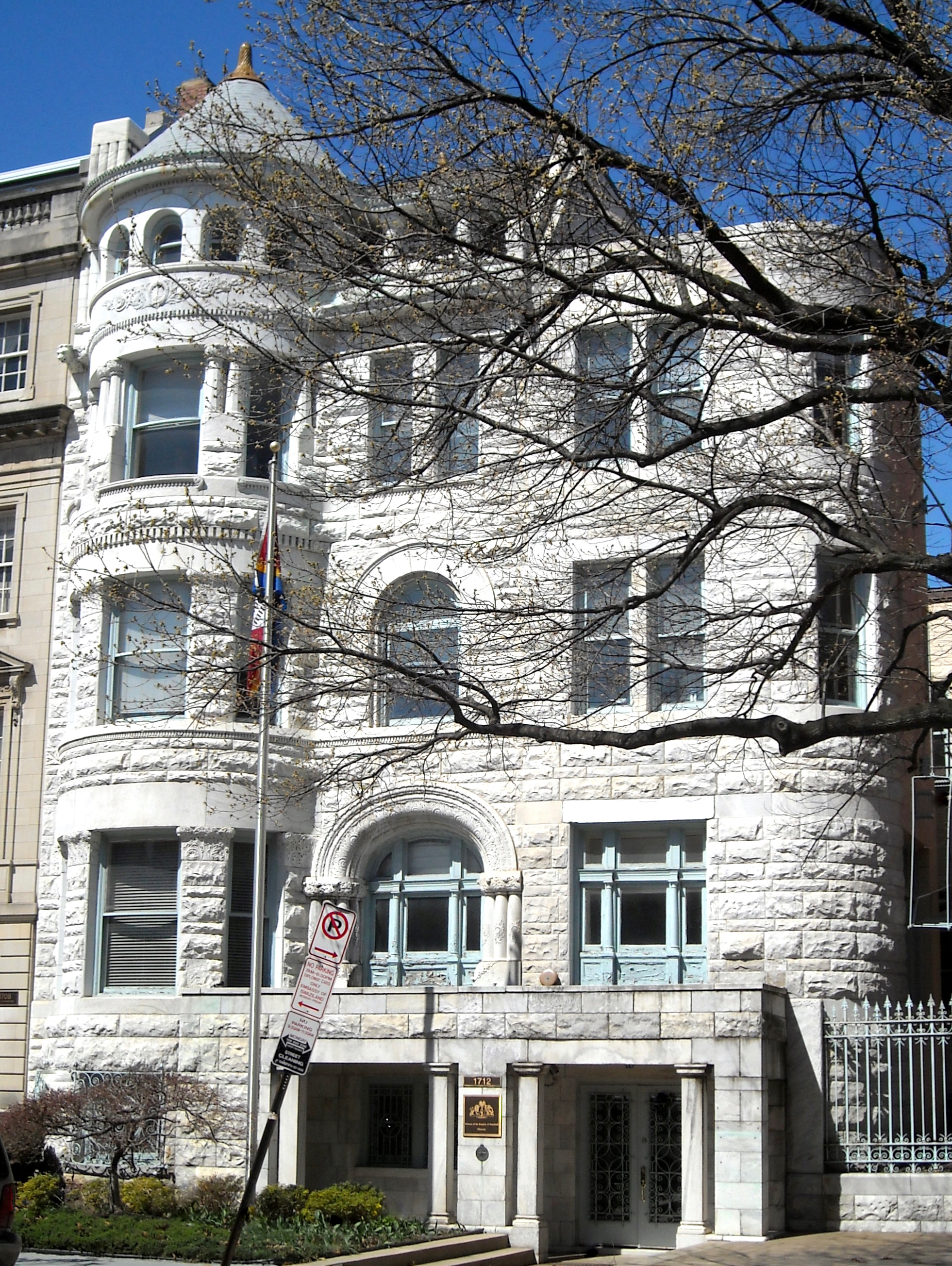
- Incumbent; Abednigo Mandla Ntshangase since August 10, 2010
- Inaugural holder: Msindazwe Sukati
- Formation: September 18, 1986

The Swazi Ambassador in Washington, D. C. is the official representative of the Government in Mbabane to the Government of the United States.

== List of representatives ==
Diplomatic agreement/designated	Diplomatic accreditation	Ambassador	Observations	List of monarchs of Eswatini	List of presidents of the United States	Term end
September 13, 1968	September 18, 1986	Msindazwe Sukati	(*June 11, 1910, at Zabeni Royal Village in the Manzini district. 1977)	Sobhuza II	Lyndon B. Johnson	
October 25, 1973	November 9, 1973	James Lawrence Funwayo Simelane		Sobhuza II	Richard Nixon	
January 24, 1977		Norman M. Vilakati	Chargé d'affaires	Sobhuza II	Jimmy Carter	
March 15, 1977	March 23, 1977	Musa Simon Kunene		Sobhuza II	Jimmy Carter	
October 17, 1979		Norman M. Vilakati	Chargé d'affaires	Sobhuza II	Jimmy Carter	
June 19, 1981	July 10, 1981	Lawrence Mfana Mncina	Minister of State for Foreign Affairs of Swaziland	Sobhuza II	Ronald Reagan	
December 20, 1982		Philemon B. Dlamini	Chargé d'affaires	Mabandla Dlamini	Ronald Reagan	
October 24, 1983	November 21, 1983	Peter Helemisi Mtetwa	February 22, 2013 )	Mabandla Dlamini	Ronald Reagan	
July 25, 1988	September 19, 1988	Absalom Vusani Mamba	(*born on April 6, 1940, in Manzini, Swaziland. Son of Zephaniah S. and Grace L. (Dlamini) Mamba.)	Mswati III	Ronald Reagan	
October 3, 1994	November 21, 1994	May Madzandza Kanya		Mswati III	Bill Clinton	
September 26, 2005	October 3, 2005	Ephraim Mandla Hlophe		Mswati III	George W. Bush	
July 19, 2010	August 10, 2010	Abednigo Mandla Ntshangase		Mswati III	Barack Obama	

== See also ==
- Eswatini–United States relations
