= Amadou Lamine Ba =

Senegalese diplomat

Amadou Lamine Ba was the ambassador of Senegal to the United States and was appointed to the position on October 17, 2002. His offices were at the Embassy of Senegal in Washington, D.C. Ba was a member of the African Diplomatic Corps (ADC), a group of 53 ambassadors that represent African countries in the United States. Ba and his wife, Oulimata, have two children named Marieme and Ali.

Ba graduated from Ohio State University with a Bachelor of Science, Master of Science, and Doctorate in biology. Earlier in his career, Ba was a teacher, co-executive of HDNA (Human Rights, Democracy, and New Leadership in Africa), member of the Executive Bureau of the US-Africa initiative, consultant for USAID (United States Agency for International Development), and the general secretary of the Supreme Council for Sport in Africa. In 2006, Ba received a key to the city of Baton Rouge, Louisiana.

== See also ==
- Senegal-United States relations
- Foreign relations of Senegal
