= Dominican Americans (Dominica) =

Americans of Dominican (Dominica) birth or descent

Dominica Dushi (Kalinago)

Total population
- 6,071 (Dominican ancestry, 2000 US Census); 33,514 (Dominican-born, 2007-2011)

Regions with significant populations
- New York City, Boston, Philadelphia, Washington, D.C., Atlanta, Miami, New Orleans and Houston

Languages
- English, Dominican Creole French, Kalinago

Religion
- Christianity

Dominican Americans, also known as Dominiquais Americans, are Americans who have full or partial ancestry from the island of Dominica.

== History ==
Several members of the Dominican diaspora met in New York for the first "Dominica Diaspora in Development" (DAAS) conference in 2001. Some Garifuna from Dominica immigrated to the United States.

== Demographics ==
The counties with the largest Dominican population are Bronx County, New York, Queens County, New York, Kings County, New York, Broward County, Florida, Harris County, Texas and Suffolk County, Massachusetts.

== Notable people ==
- Aldis Hodge
- DJ Envy
- Edwin Hodge
- Erison Hurtault
- Maurice DuBois
- Tobi Jnohope
- Adolph Caesar
- Rosetta LeNoire
- Wyatt Bardouille

== See also ==
- Dominica–United States relations
