= Gillian Bristol =

Grenadian diplomat

Gillian M. S. Bristol

Grenada Ambassador to United States of America
- In office May 2009 – September 13, 2013
- Prime Minister: Tillman Thomas
- Succeeded by: Ethelstan Angus Friday

Grenada Ambassador to Mexico
- In office August 2010 – September 13, 2013
- Prime Minister: Tillman Thomas
- Succeeded by: Ethelstan Angus Friday

Personal details
- Born: Grenada
- Education: University of the West Indies
- Occupation: diplomat

Gillian Bristol is a diplomat from Grenada, serving as ambassador to the United States and Mexico for the small island nation. She was the first Caribbean Islander to be president of the OAS Staff Association (the professional organization who represents OAS employees to OAS management).

== Early life and education ==
Bristol is the child of Ruth and Carol Bristol and was born in St. Georges, Grenada. Her father Carol is a prominent Grenadian attorney who also served as Chief Justice. She attended St. Joseph's Convent High School in Grenada and Trinidad and Tobago, and earned honors degrees in languages (BA) and law (LLB) from the University of the West Indies in Cave Hill, Barbados in 1988.

== Career ==
From 1992 through to 2008 she worked for the Organization of American States (OAS), as secretary for several committees affiliated with the OAS Permanent Council, as well as Program Manager at the Inter-American Committee Against Terrorism. She was elected as President of the OAS Staff Association in 2007.

In 2009, Bristol was appointed by Prime Minister Tillman Thomas as the country's ambassador to the United States, where she headed Grenada's Mission in Washington, DC. In 2010, she was also accredited as Grenada's non-resident Ambassador to Mexico. Following the 2013 election, she was replaced by Dr. E. Angus Friday.

In August 2016, Bristol joined the newly established Office for Global Affairs at the University of the West Indies at Mona, Jamaica, and was appointed director of the Latin American and Caribbean Centre (LACC).
