= List of ambassadors of Guinea-Bissau to the United States =

List of Bissau-Guinean ambassadors

Coordinates: 38.915416°N 77.047074°W

Ambassador of Guinea-Bissau to the United States
- Incumbent; Mario Lopes da Rosa since September 10, 1998
- Inaugural holder: Gil Vicente Vaz Fernandes
- Formation: September 3, 1975

The Bissau-Guinean ambassador in Washington, D. C. is the official representative of the Government in Bissau to the Government of the United States and concurrently accredited in Mexico City and Ottawa.

== List of representatives ==
Diplomatic agrément	Diplomatic accreditation	Ambassador	Observations	List of prime ministers of Guinea-Bissau	List of presidents of the United States	Term end
August 14, 1975	September 3, 1975	Gil Vicente Vaz Fernandes		Francisco Mendes	Gerald Ford	
August 12, 1981	October 26, 1981	Inacio Semedo	(born June 15, 1944 in Bambadinca). Son of Tiburcio Julio Semedo and Domingas Lopes d’Oliveira.: Education: Master of Science in Agricultural Sciences, Faculty Agronomy, Godollo, Hungary. Doctor of Philosophy in Plant Pathology, Budapest Academy of Sciences, Hungary. Degree in Political, Military School, Madina do Boe.; 1972–1973:in-charge student section African Party Guinea-Cape Verde Independence, with secretariat party, dealing external policies, 1973: Party representative Algeria.; 1974–1978: Director-general international cooperative Prime Minister' General’ s Office, Guinea-Bissau, . Bilaterla Cooperative Projects, Guinea-Bissau.; 1981:Socialist bloc Gulf States, Latin American Countries. Permanent representative Republic Guinea-Bissau United Nations, New York City.; father: Tiburcio Julio Semedo.; mother: Domingas Lopes d’Oliveira.; spouse: Alcina de Figueiredo Garcia	João Bernardo Vieira	Ronald Reagan	
October 9, 1986	May 11, 1987	Alfredo Lopes Cabral	Amb Cabral out of countries for two credential ceremonies at White House November 24, 1986 and October 2, 1987 did not return to present credentials at those times.	Victor Saúde Maria	Ronald Reagan	
September 19, 1996	October 9, 1996	Rufino Mendes		Manuel Saturnino da Costa	Bill Clinton	
August 25, 1998	September 10, 1998	Mario Lopes da Rosa	4863 votes in the June 19, 2005 first round of Presidentials elections.	Francisco Fadul	Bill Clinton	
