= Francis Bugotu =

Solomon Islands public servant and educationist (1937–1992)

Francis Bugotu CBE
- Born: 27 June 1937; Guadalcanal, Solomon Islands
- Died: 9 July 1992 (aged 55); Honiara, Solomon Islands
- Education: Ardmore Teachers' Training College; Moray House School of Education; University of Lancaster

Francis Bugotu CBE (27 June 1937 – 9 July 1992) was a Solomon Islands public servant, diplomat, and educationist. He served two terms as the country's permanent representative to the United Nations, and was also secretary-general of the South Pacific Commission from 1982 to 1986.

== Early life ==
Bugotu was born in Guadalcanal. He attended St. Mary's School, Maravovo, and All Hallows' School, Ugi Island. He later completed further studies in New Zealand at St. Stephen's College, Auckland, and Ardmore Teachers' Training College. Bugotu taught at All Hallows' School for one year before becoming a schools inspector with the Diocese of Melanesia (1959–1960). He was appointed to the Legislative Council of the Solomon Islands in 1960, serving until 1962.

== Academia ==
Bugotu became an officer in the Education Department in 1962, and in 1964 moved to Scotland to attend Moray House School of Education, completing a diploma in the teaching of English as a second language. He lectured at the British Solomons Training College from 1964 to 1968, and also carried out research into the Lengo (Tadhimboko) language. He attended a three-month course at the University of Queensland in 1967, and from 1970 to 1971 studied at the University of Lancaster in England, becoming the first Solomon Islander to complete a Master of Arts degree.

== Public life ==
In the years leading up to independence in 1978, Bugotu held a number of senior positions in the Solomon Islands Public Service. He was chairman of the Review Committee on Education (1974–1975), Permanent Secretary for Education and Cultural Affairs, and Permanent Secretary to the Council of Ministers. After independence, he became the inaugural secretary of the Ministry of Foreign Affairs, and was a "roving ambassador and high commissioner". At his own suggestion, he was simultaneously accredited to the U.S., the UK, Australia, New Zealand, Canada, West Germany, Sweden, the UN, and the European Economic Community. This model was subsequently taken up by several other small countries.

Bugotu was the inaugural Permanent Representative of the Solomon Islands to the United Nations, and accompanied Prime Minister Peter Kenilorea at the ceremony celebrating the country's admission as the 150th UN member. In July 1982, he was chosen as Secretary-General of the South Pacific Commission, the first Solomon Islander to hold the position. He was responsible for the organisation's decision to allow non-sovereign states to join, thereby significantly increasing its membership. His term was extended by two years in October 1984, the first time that had occurred.

In 1990, Bugotu was reappointed Permanent Representative to the UN and also accredited as Ambassador to the U.S. and Canada. He died of a heart attack in 1992, aged 55, while attending the South Pacific Forum in Honiara. He was replaced by colleague diplomat Bernard Bata'anisia in New York from August 1992.
