= List of ambassadors of São Tomé and Príncipe to the United States =

Coordinates: 38.906292°N 77.040908°W

Ambassador of São Tomé and Príncipe to United States
- Incumbent; Vacant since January 21, 2017
- Inaugural holder: Joaquim Rafael Branco
- Formation: March 5, 1985

The São Toméan] ambassador in Washington, D.C. is the official representative of the Government in São Tomé to the Government of the United States.

== List of representatives ==
Diplomatic agrément	Diplomatic accreditation	Ambassador	Observations	List of prime ministers of São Tomé and Príncipe	List of presidents of the United States	Term end
February 1, 1985	March 5, 1985	Joaquim Rafael Branco		Manuel Pinto da Costa	Ronald Reagan	
March 10, 2006	March 13, 2006	Ovídio Manuel Barbosa Pequeno		Maria do Carmo Silveira	George W. Bush	
November 19, 2013	December 3, 2013	Carlos Neves		Gabriel Costa	Barack Obama	January 21, 2017

- São Tomé and Príncipe–United States relations
