= List of ambassadors of Turkmenistan to the United States =

Coordinates: 38°54′43.1″N 77°2′57.4″W

Ambassador of Turkmenistan to United States
- Inaugural holder: Khalil Ugur
- Formation: June 23, 1994

The Turkmen Ambassador in Washington, D.C. is the official representative of the Government in Ashgabat to the Government of United States.

== List of representatives ==
Diplomatic agrément	Diplomatic accreditation	Ambassador	Observations	President of Turkmenistan	President of the United States	Term end
June 23, 1994		Khalil Ugur		Saparmurat Niyazov	Bill Clinton	December 21, 2006
January 31, 2001	February 14, 2001	Meret Orazov	In 2011, he was concurrently appointed as ambassador to Mexico.; In 2016, he was concurrently appointed as Ambassador to Canada.	Saparmurat Niyazov	George W. Bush	December 21, 2006

== See also ==
- Embassy of Turkmenistan, Washington, D.C.
- United States–Turkmenistan relations
