= List of ambassadors of Senegal to the United States =

List of Senegalese Ambassadors to the United States

Coordinates: 38.905541°N 77.049464°W

Ambassador of Senegal to United States Embassy of Senegal, Washington, D.C.
- Incumbent; Babacar Diagne since November 18, 2014
- Inaugural holder: Ousmane Diop Socé
- Formation: December 9, 1960

The Senegalese ambassador in Washington, D.C. is the official representative of the Government in Dakar to the Government of the United States.

== List of representatives ==
Diplomatic agrément	Diplomatic accreditation	Ambassador	Observations	President of Senegal	List of presidents of the United States	Term end
December 9, 1960			EMBASSY OPENED	Léopold Sédar Senghor	Dwight D. Eisenhower	
November 16, 1960	December 9, 1960	Ousmane Diop Socé		Léopold Sédar Senghor	Dwight D. Eisenhower	
May 23, 1968	June 5, 1968	Cheikh Ibrahima Fall		Léopold Sédar Senghor	Lyndon B. Johnson	
October 7, 1971	October 21, 1971	Andre Jean Coulbary		Léopold Sédar Senghor	Richard Nixon	
April 23, 1982		Henri Antoine Turpin	Charge d'Affaires	Abdou Diouf	Ronald Reagan	
May 14, 1982	June 25, 1982	Abdourahmane Dia	*On October 1, 1976 he became Senegalese Ambassador to Germany Senegal's Ambassador to Germany (GFR) M. Abdourahmane Dia, has presented his credentials to the Head of State, Herr Scheel	Abdou Diouf	Ronald Reagan	
July 10, 1984	August 29, 1984	Falilou Kane		Abdou Diouf	Ronald Reagan	
September 20, 1988	November 9, 1988	Ibra Deguene Ka		Abdou Diouf	Ronald Reagan	
November 1, 1993	December 9, 1993	fr:Mamadou Mansour Seck		Abdou Diouf	Bill Clinton	
October 17, 2002	December 9, 2002	Amadou Lamine Ba		Abdoulaye Wade	George W. Bush	
March 25, 2010	March 29, 2010	Fatou Danielle Diagne	Ministre de la Compétitivité et de la Bonne gouvernance entre le 25 juin 2007 et une date inconnue.	Abdoulaye Wade	Barack Obama	
July 13, 2012	July 30, 2012	Cheikh Niang		Macky Sall	Barack Obama	
November 14, 2014	November 18, 2014	Babacar Diagne		Macky Sall	Barack Obama	

- Senegal–United States relations
