= Amelia Sumbana =

Mozambican diplomat

Amelia Narciso Matos Sumbana
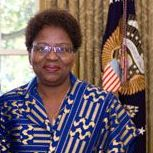
- in 2009
- Occupation: Ambassador
- Known for: former Ambassador of Mozambique to the United States
- Successor: Carlos dos Santos
- Political party: FRELIMO
- Spouse: Adrian Sumbana

Amelia Narciso Matos Sumbana was an ambassador of Mozambique to the United States from 2009 to 2015. She was sentenced to ten years in prison in 2019 for misuse of public funds.

== Life ==
Sumbana attended Eduardo Mondlane University. She was elected to parliament in 1994 and three years later she was Secretary of FREMILO's Central Committee for International Relations. She served on that committee until 2006 and she remained in parliament until 2009. In October 2003 when António Guterres presided over the 22nd Socialist International Congress in São Paulo, Amelia Sumbana was an ex-officio vice president.

Sumbana was one of the founders of the Red Cross in her country and from 2000 to 2004 she was Mozambique's Red Cross's Deputy President.

Sumbana was appointed as an ambassador of Mozambique to the United States and she presented her credentials in 2009 to President Obama at the White House on 4 November 2009. During her time in office American officials alerted the Mozambique Ministry of Foreign Affairs to unusual movements in accounts associated with the ministry. She was accused of selling one of the embassy's properties and then redirecting the funds to purchase an apartment that was placed in the name of one of her relatives. Money was requested to cover building work at the embassy and unusually the money was paid into her bank account. A ministry official was accused of being complicit with this arrangement.

She served until 2015. She was replaced by Carlos Dos Santos in October and he presented his credentials in January 2016. She was accused of diverting government money through her own personal account and in overcharging her expenses.

She was sentenced to ten years in prison in 2019. She was ordered to repay $280,000 - the money she had misappropriated. The court had frozen two of her bank accounts and had seized her house in Maputo.
