= List of ambassadors of Dominica to the United States =

Coordinates: 38.933187°N 77.085922°W

Ambassador of Dominica to the United States Caribbean Chancery in Washington, D.C.
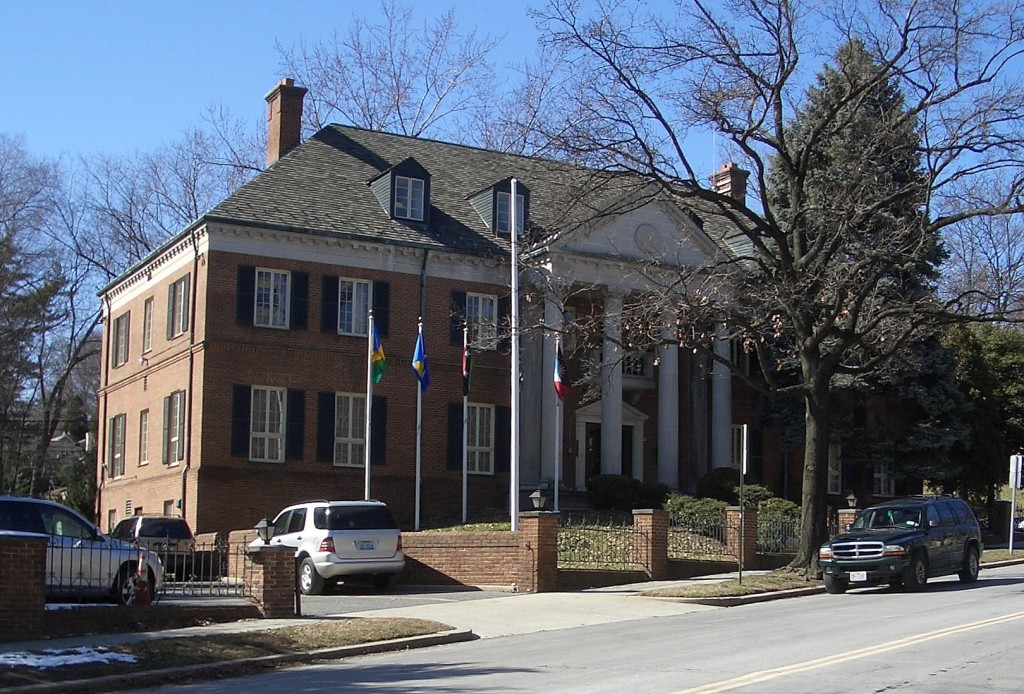
- Incumbent; Hubert J. Charles since August 10, 2010
- Inaugural holder: Franklin Arthur Merrifield Baron
- Formation: February 16, 1982

The Dominican ambassador in Washington, D. C. is the official representative of the Government in Roseau to the Government of the United States.

== List of representatives ==
Diplomatic agrément	Diplomatic accreditation	Ambassador	Observations	List of heads of government of Dominica	List of presidents of the United States	Term end
November 3, 1978			Independence	Patrick John	Jimmy Carter	
February 11, 1982	February 16, 1982	Franklin Arthur Merrifield Baron	From 1960 to 1961 he was chief minister.	Mary Eugenia Charles	Ronald Reagan	
September 17, 1986	November 24, 1986	McDonald Phillip Benjamin	(*1924 October 22, 1989)	Mary Eugenia Charles	Ronald Reagan	
December 4, 1990	February 19, 1991	Edward Irving Watty	Resident in Dominica	Mary Eugenia Charles	George H. W. Bush	
March 13, 1998	March 16, 1998	Nicholas Liverpool		Edison James	Bill Clinton	
July 16, 2010	August 10, 2010	Hubert J. Charles		Roosevelt Skerrit	Barack Obama	
	October 1, 2016	Vince Henderson		Roosevelt Skerrit	Barack Obama	

== See also ==
- Dominica–United States relations
