= List of ambassadors of Ivory Coast to the United States =

Coordinates: 38°54′50.0″N 77°03′12.9″W

Ambassador of Ivory Coast to United States
- Incumbent; Haidara Mamadou since March 28, 2018
- Inaugural holder: Henri Konan Bédié
- Formation: October 24, 1960

The Ivorian ambassador in Washington, D.C. is the official representative of the Government in Abidjan to the Government of the United States.

== List of representatives ==
Diplomatic agrément	Diplomatic accreditation	Ambassador	Observations	Prime Minister of Ivory Coast	List of presidents of the United States	Term end
October 24, 1960		Henri Konan Bédié	Charge d'affaires opened the embassy	Félix Houphouët-Boigny	Dwight D. Eisenhower	
December 22, 1960	January 17, 1961	Henri Konan Bédié		Félix Houphouët-Boigny	Dwight D. Eisenhower	
November 21, 1966	December 14, 1966	Timothée Ahoua N'Guetta		Félix Houphouët-Boigny	Lyndon B. Johnson	
March 31, 1982	April 12, 1982	Rene Amany	Was minister of defense residing in Beverly Park.	Félix Houphouët-Boigny	Ronald Reagan	
September 30, 1986	November 24, 1986	Charles Providence Gomis		Félix Houphouët-Boigny	Ronald Reagan	
June 23, 1994		Moïse Koffi Koumoue	From 1986 to 1990 he was Minister of Budget, Economy and Finance, from 1991 to February 17, 1994 he was ambassador to Tokyo	Alassane Ouattara	Bill Clinton	
October 10, 2000	October 31, 2001	Youssoufou Bamba		Pascal Affi N'Guessan	Bill Clinton	
November 5, 2001	November 8, 2001	Pascal Kokora		Pascal Affi N'Guessan	George W. Bush	
April 23, 2004	July 15, 2004	Daouda Diabate		Seydou Diarra	George W. Bush	
November 21, 2007	January 22, 2008	Charles Koffi		Guillaume Soro	George W. Bush	
February 11, 2011	February 23, 2011	Daouda Diabate		Guillaume Soro	Barack Obama	
March 28, 2018	March 28, 2018	Haidara Mamadou		Alassane Ouattara	Donald Trump	

== See also ==
- Ivory Coast–United States relations
