= List of ambassadors of Nauru to the United States =

Coordinates: 38.910556°N 77.041944°W

Ambassador of Nauru to the United States Embassy of Mozambique in Washington, D.C.
- Incumbent; Marlene Moses since March 13, 2006
- Inaugural holder: Tamaiti Willie Star
- Formation: June 6, 1980

The Nauruan ambassador in Washington, D. C. is the official representative of the Government in the Yaren District to the Government of the United States.

- In 1976 the governments of Hammer DeRoburt and Gerald Ford established diplomatic relations,
- Nauru has no embassy in Washington, DC, but has a mission next the United Nations Headquarters in New York City.
- In September 1999 the Republic of Nauru was admitted as the 187th member state of the United Nations, and subsequently established its Permanent Mission in January 2000.
- From Dec. 1999 to February 2005 Vinci Niel Clodumar was the first Permanent Representative of the Republic of Nauru next the Headquarters of the United Nations.

== List of representatives ==
Diplomatic agrément	Diplomatic accreditation	ambassador	Observations	President of Nauru	List of presidents of the United States	Term end
May 29, 1980	June 6, 1980	Tamaiti Willie Star	(*October 1926)	Hammer DeRoburt	Jimmy Carter	
July 21, 2004	September 15, 2004	Vinci Niel Clodumar	*From Dec. 1999 to February 2005 he was the first Permanent Representative of the Republic of Nauru next the Headquarters of the United Nations.	Ludwig Scotty	George W. Bush	
February 10, 2006	March 13, 2006	Marlene Moses		Ludwig Scotty	George W. Bush	
September 3, 2013		Caleb T. O. Otto	only accredited as Permanent Representative next the Headquarters of the United Nations.	Baron Waqa	Barack Obama	2019
	January 13, 2025	Lara Daniel		David Adeang	Joe Biden	
