= Monaco–United States relations =

Bilateral relations between the US and Monaco

- Monaco: United States

Monaco and the United States exchanged consular officials soon after the end of the U.S. Civil War. The first consul from Monaco to the US was Louis Borg, who presented his credentials in May 1866.

== History ==
In 1897 it was estimated that the consul in New York served less than half a dozen citizens of Monaco, with about 40 in the United States in 1901, and supported no extensive commerce, as French customs processed all Monaco trade. In 1901 the unpaid Monaco consul in New York City, Auguste Jouve, was also the French vice consul. His duties for Monaco were to forward scientific papers to Prince Albert I, and provide a reception for Monaco's navy of one steam ship.

The first US consular agent was Emile de Loth, accredited in February 1874, but this post was closed and moved to Nice in 1906. A US consulate was briefly set up in Monaco in November 1942 by Walter Orebaugh at the behest of his superior Pinkney Tuck. It was located in two rooms of the Hotel Metropole, but it was closed a few days later by invading Italian forces.

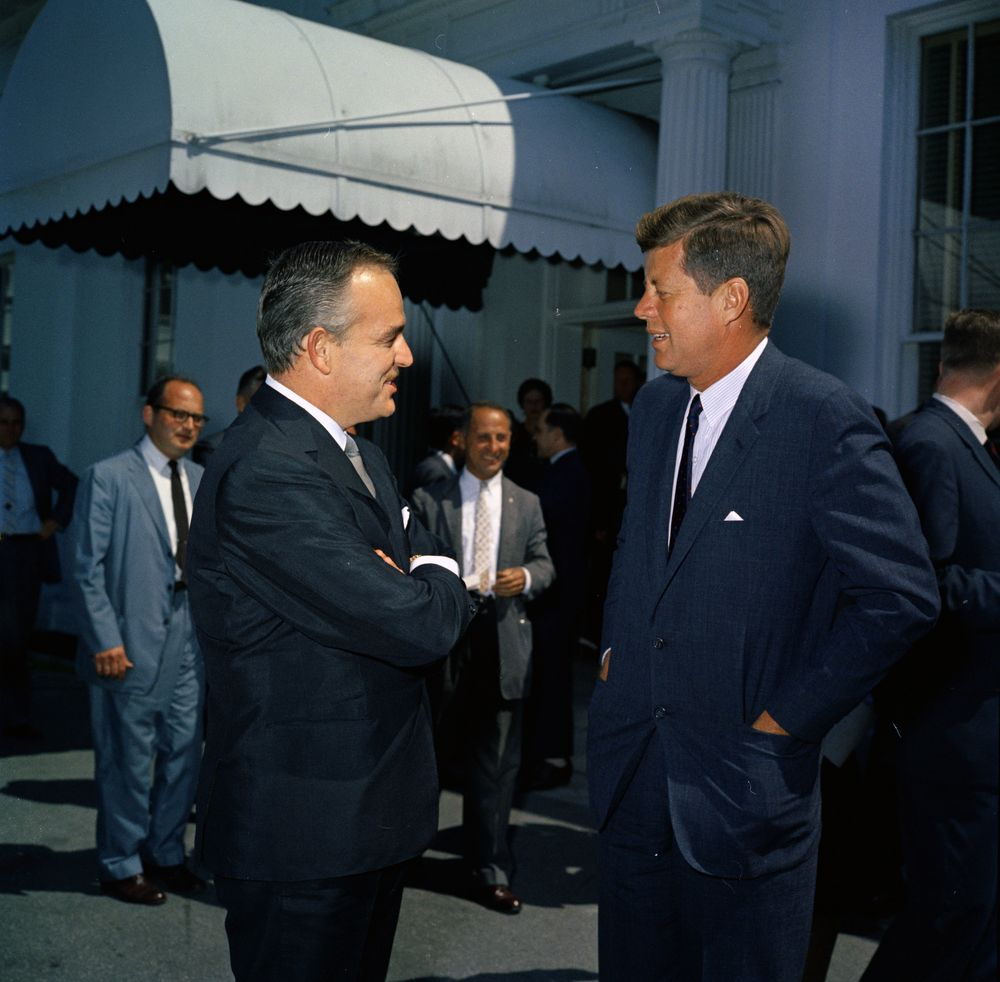
Rainier III and John F. Kennedy after a luncheon in honour of the Prince and his wife, May 1961.

Albert I travelled to the US three times. Monaco hosted US soldiers during the First World War. From 1956 until her death in 1982, the American-born Grace Kelly was married to Prince Rainier III. They made their first official visit to the United States in 1956.

Until 2006 Monaco's only career consul-general (Maguy Maccario Doyle in 2006) operated out of New York, but directed all the honorary consuls in placements worldwide.

In December 2006, the United States and Monaco upgraded from consular to full diplomatic relations. Shortly thereafter, Craig Stapleton (ambassador to France) was accredited to Monaco, and ambassador Gilles Noghes became the first Monegasque ambassador to the United States. In 2009 Stapleton was replaced by Charles Rivkin. The United States does not yet have a diplomatic mission located in Monaco but there is an embassy in Paris, and a consulate general in Marseille. On December 3, 2013, Maguy Maccario Doyle was appointed to be the Monegasque ambassador to the United States by Prince Albert II. She is the first woman to hold that post.

== Agreements ==
An extradition treaty was signed between the two nations in 1939. An agreement on passport visas was signed in 1952. A tax information exchange agreement was made in 2009.

== Diplomatic mission of Monaco in Washington, D.C. ==
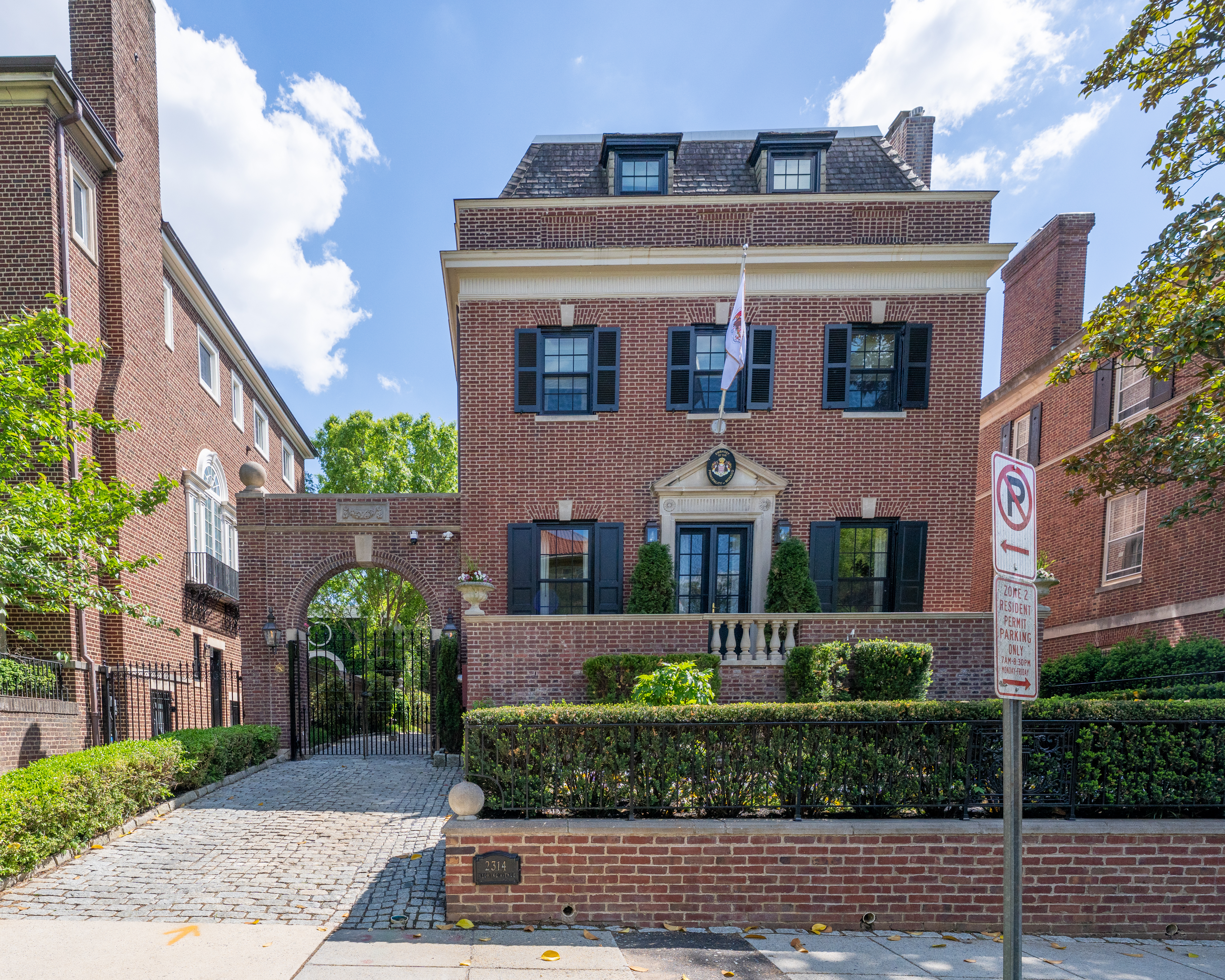
Residence of the Embassy of Monaco in Washington, D.C.

The Embassy of Monaco in Washington, D.C. is the diplomatic mission of the Principality of Monaco to the United States and Canada. The Embassy's Chancery is located at 888 17th Street, Northwest, Washington, D.C., near Farragut Square in northwest Washington, D.C., while the Ambassador's Residence, once the home of President Warren G. Harding, is located in Washington's Kalorama neighborhood.

The current ambassador is H.E. Maguy Maccario Doyle. Ambassador Maccario Doyle is also concurrently accredited to Canada, as well as the permanent observer of Monaco to the Organization of American States.
