= Dominica–United States relations =

- Dominica: United States

Dominica–United States relations are bilateral relations between the Commonwealth of Dominica and the United States of America.

== Overview ==
The United States and the Commonwealth of Dominica have positive bilateral relations. The United States supports the Dominican government's efforts to expand its economic base and to provide a higher standard of living for its citizens. U.S. assistance is primarily channeled through multilateral agencies such as the World Bank and the Caribbean Development Bank (CDB), as well as through the U.S. Agency for International Development (USAID) office in Bridgetown, Barbados. The Peace Corps also provides technical assistance to the Commonwealth of Dominica, and has volunteers on the island working primarily in education, youth development, and health.

The United States and the Commonwealth of Dominica work together in the struggle against illegal drugs. Dominica cooperates with U.S. agencies and participates in counter-narcotics programs in an effort to curb drug trafficking and marijuana cultivation. In 1995, the Dominican government signed a maritime law enforcement agreement with the United States to strengthen counter-narcotics coordination, and in 1996, the government signed mutual legal assistance and extradition treaties to enhance joint efforts in combating international crime.

Dominica had around 252,000 visitors in 2005, which represented a contraction in both cruise line and stay-over arrivals over the record performance set in 2004. It is estimated that 4,500 Americans reside in the country.

== Diplomatic missions ==
- Dominica has an embassy in Washington, D.C. and a consulate-general in New York City.
- United States is accredited to Dominica from its embassy in Bridgetown, Barbados.

== See also ==
- Dominican Americans (Dominica)
- North American Union
- North American Free Trade Agreement
- Free Trade Area of the Americas
- Third Border Initiative
- Caribbean Community
- Caribbean Basin Initiative (CBI)
- Caribbean Basin Trade Partnership Act
- Western Hemisphere Travel Initiative
- Foreign relations of the United States
- Foreign relations of Dominica
- List of ambassadors of Dominica to the United States
