= List of ambassadors of the Marshall Islands to the United States =

Coordinates: 38°54′53.6″N 77°03′14.0″W

Ambassador of the Marshall Islands to the United States Embassy of the Marshall Islands in Washington, D.C.
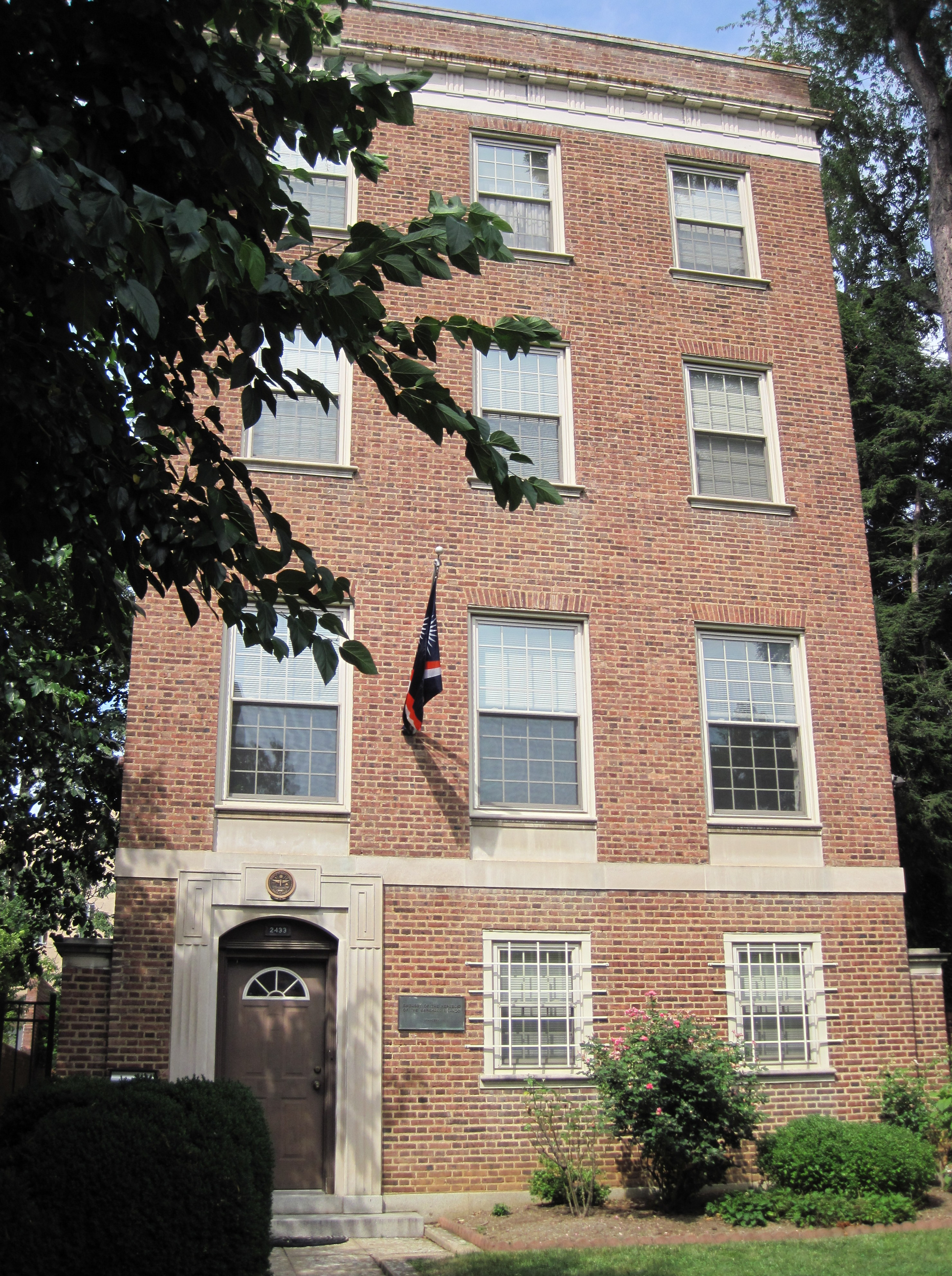
- Inaugural holder: Wilfred I. Kendall
- Formation: December 21, 1987

The Marshallese ambassador in Washington, D. C. is the official representative of the Government in Majuro to the Government of the United States.

== List of representatives ==
Diplomatic agrément	Diplomatic accreditation	Ambassador	Observations	List of presidents of the Marshall Islands	List of presidents of the United States	Term end
October 21, 1987			The governments of Amata Kabua and Ronald Reagan formally established relations and agreed to the exchange of Representatives.	Amata Kabua	Ronald Reagan	
November 24, 1987	December 21, 1987	Wilfred I. Kendall	Representative	Amata Kabua	Ronald Reagan	
August 23, 1989	September 6, 1989		By exchange of notes dated August 23, 1989 and September 6, 1989, the governments of the Republic of the Marshall Islands and the United States of America agreed to commence and conduct Diplomatic Representation at the Ambassadorial level.	Amata Kabua	George H. W. Bush	
October 13, 1989	December 18, 1989	Wilfred I. Kendall	(* January 27, 1943 in Majuro)	Amata Kabua	George H. W. Bush	
March 26, 1996	March 30, 1996	Banny deBrum		Amata Kabua	Bill Clinton	
October 30, 2009	November 4, 2009	Banny deBrum		Ruben Zackhras	Barack Obama	
September 6, 2011	September 9, 2011	Charles Rudolph Paul	(*Born in 1980)	Jurelang Zedkaia	Barack Obama	
	September 16, 2016	Gerald Zackios	(*Born in 1965)	Hilda Heine	Barack Obama, Donald Trump	January 14, 2020
