= Turkmenistan–United States relations =

- Turkmenistan: United States

Turkmenistan–United States relations are bilateral relations between Turkmenistan and the United States since 10 April 1992.

== History ==
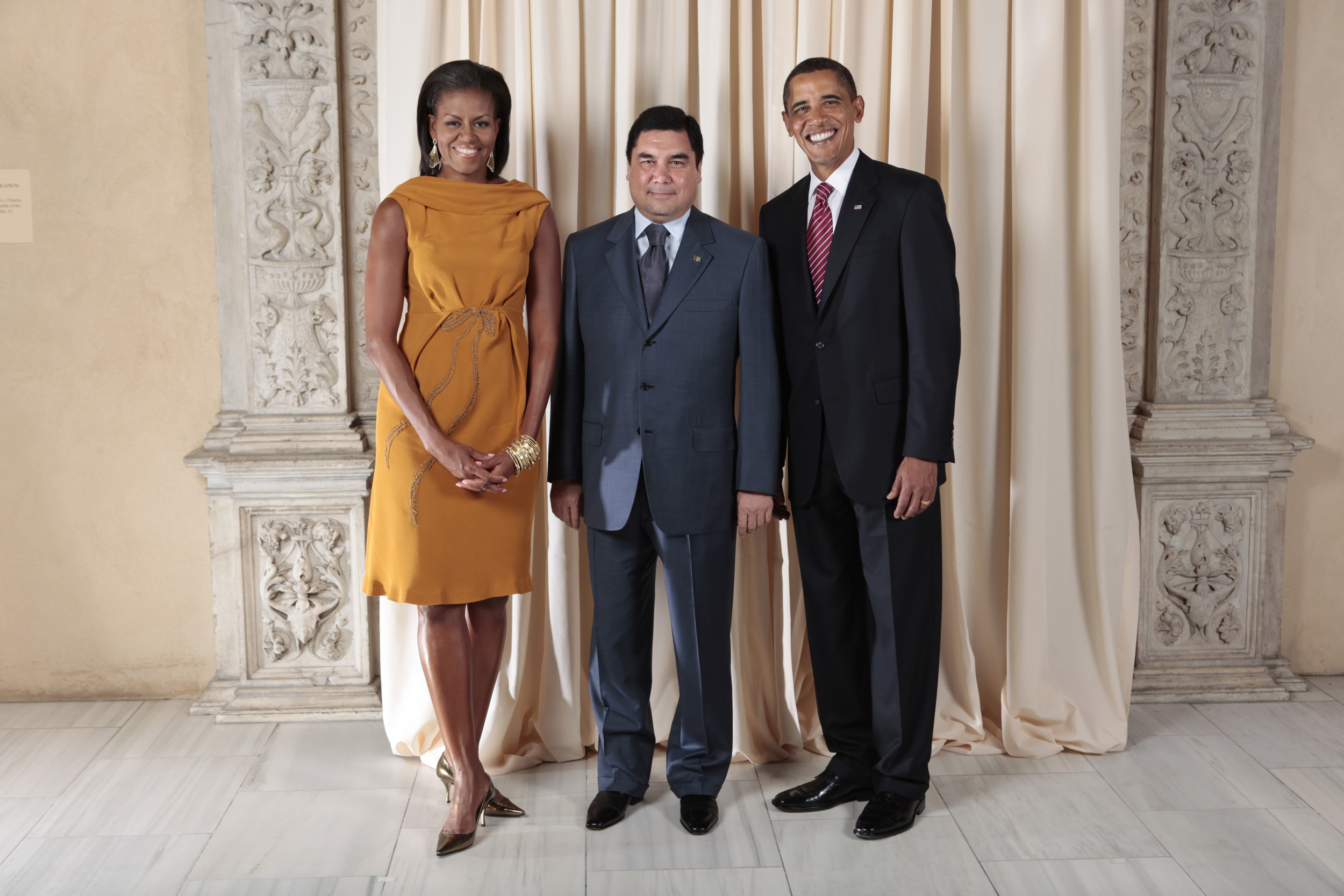
Gurbanguly Berdimuhammedov with Barack and Michelle Obama in 2009

On April 23, 1998, Turkmen president Saparmurat Niyazov met with US president Bill Clinton in Washington D.C., resulting in a joint statement where both countries stated they aimed to "strengthen political, economic, security, commercial and agricultural ties".

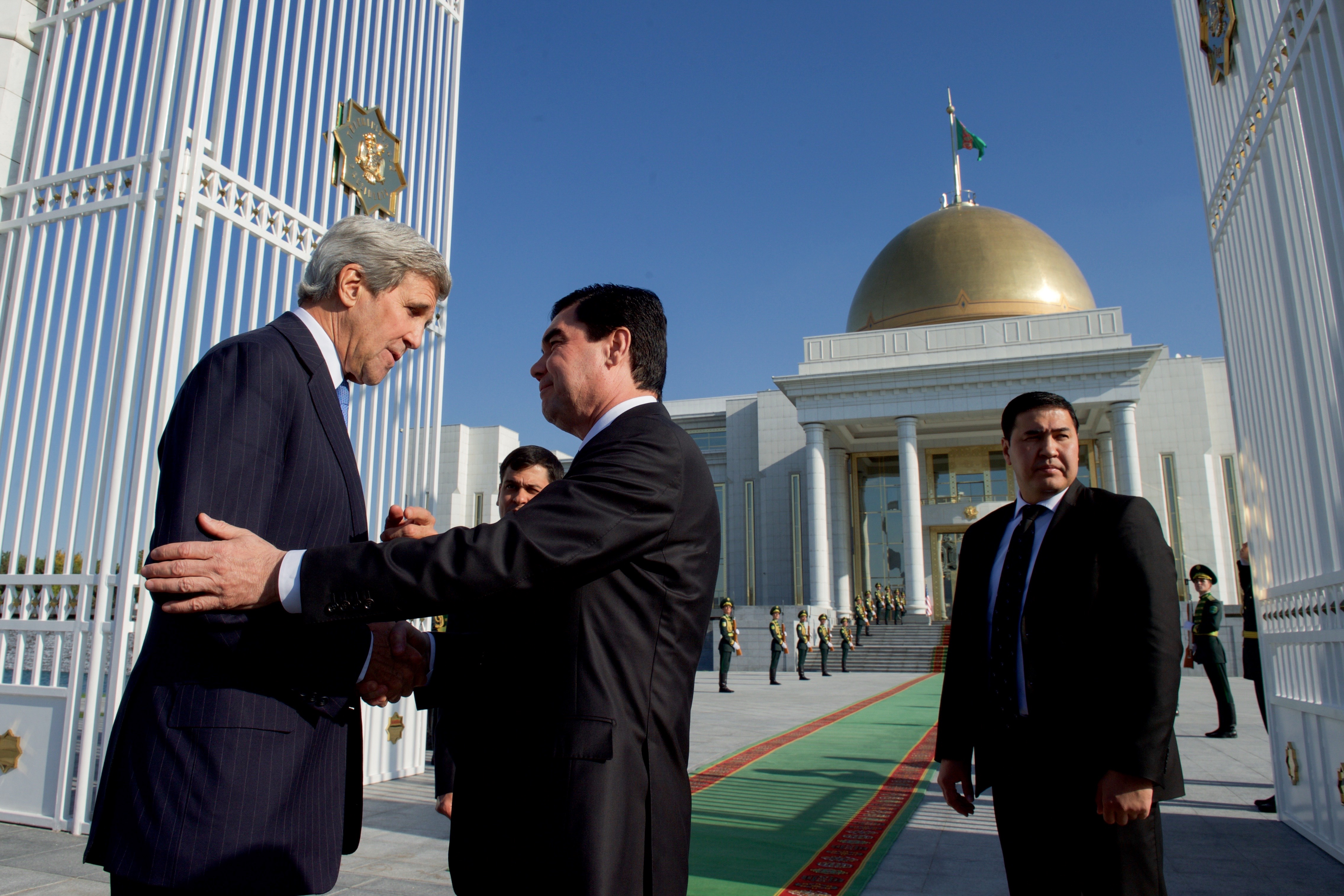
Secretary Kerry Shakes Hands With President Berdimuhamedov at the Oguzkhan Presidential Palace in Ashgabat, 2015

For several years, Turkmenistan was a key player in the U.S. Caspian Basin Energy Initiative, which sought to facilitate negotiations between commercial partners and the Governments of Turkmenistan, Georgia, Azerbaijan, and Turkey to build a pipeline under the Caspian Sea and export Turkmen gas to the Turkish domestic energy market and beyond—the so-called Trans-Caspian Gas Pipeline (TCGP). However, the Government of Turkmenistan essentially removed itself from the negotiations in 2000 by refusing all offers by its commercial partners and making unrealistic demands for billion-dollar "pre-financing." Following a tripartite summit with the presidents of Russia and Kazakhstan in May 2007 in which gas was a major topic, however, the new President Berdimuhamedow resurrected the idea of a Trans-Caspian gas pipeline, explicitly refusing to rule out the possibility of constructing such a pipeline in the future.

In 2010, the Obama administration began its annual bilateral consultations (ABCs) with all the countries of Central Asia, with the first US-Turkmen ABC being held in Ashgabat in June.

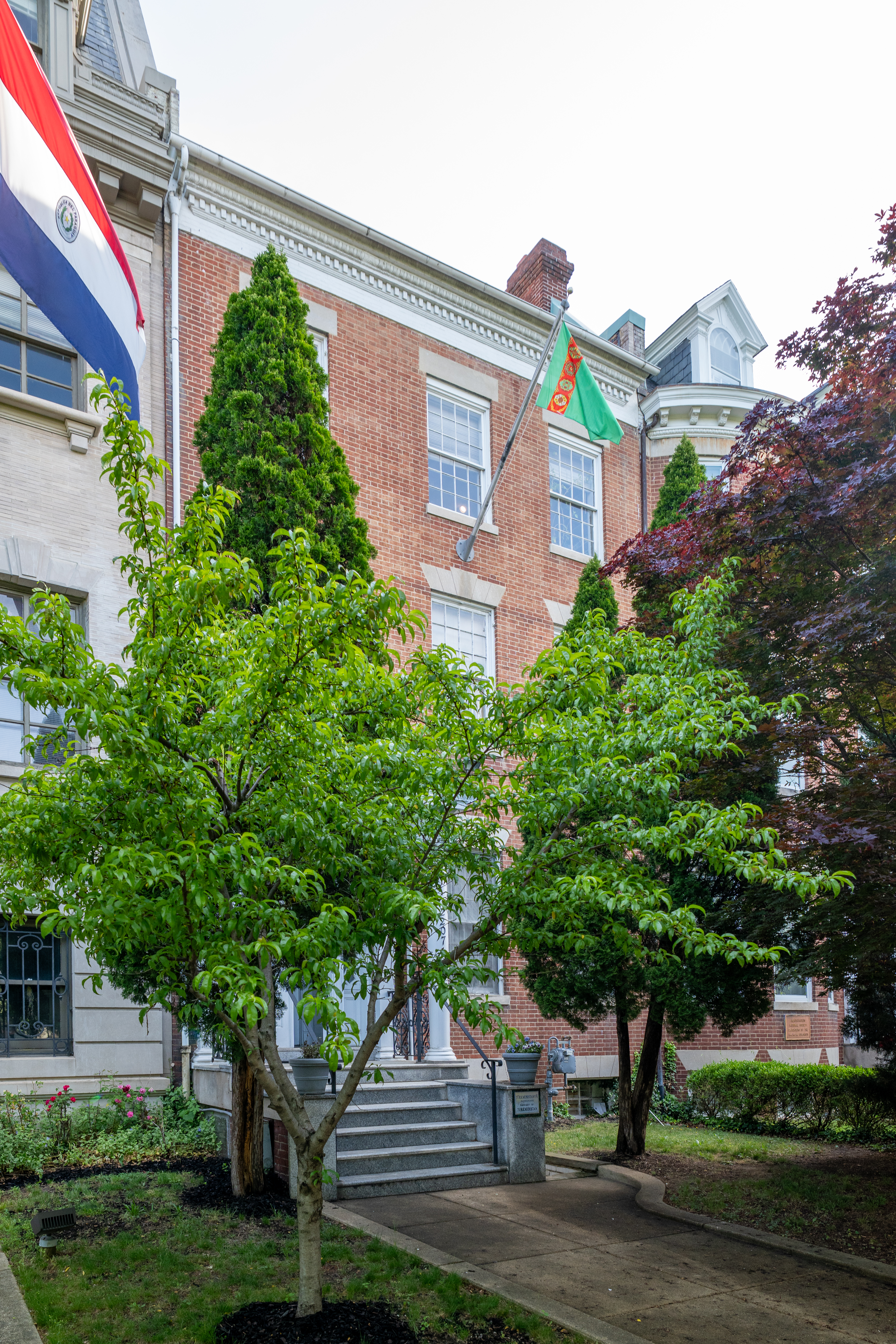
Embassy of Turkmenistan in Washington, D.C.

As a part of Donald Trump's travel bans in 2025, Turkmenistan faced a partial ban on visas to the United States, which included bans on tourist visas, student visas, or applications to live permanently in the U.S. The Trump administration cited a high rate of overstay by Turkmenistani citizens on their visas as the reason for the ban.

The U.S. Embassy and offices of USAID and the Peace Corps are located in Ashgabat, Turkmenistan.

== See also ==
- Foreign relations of Turkmenistan
- Foreign relations of the United States
- List of ambassadors of Turkmenistan to the United States
