= Youssoufou Bamba =

Ivorian diplomat

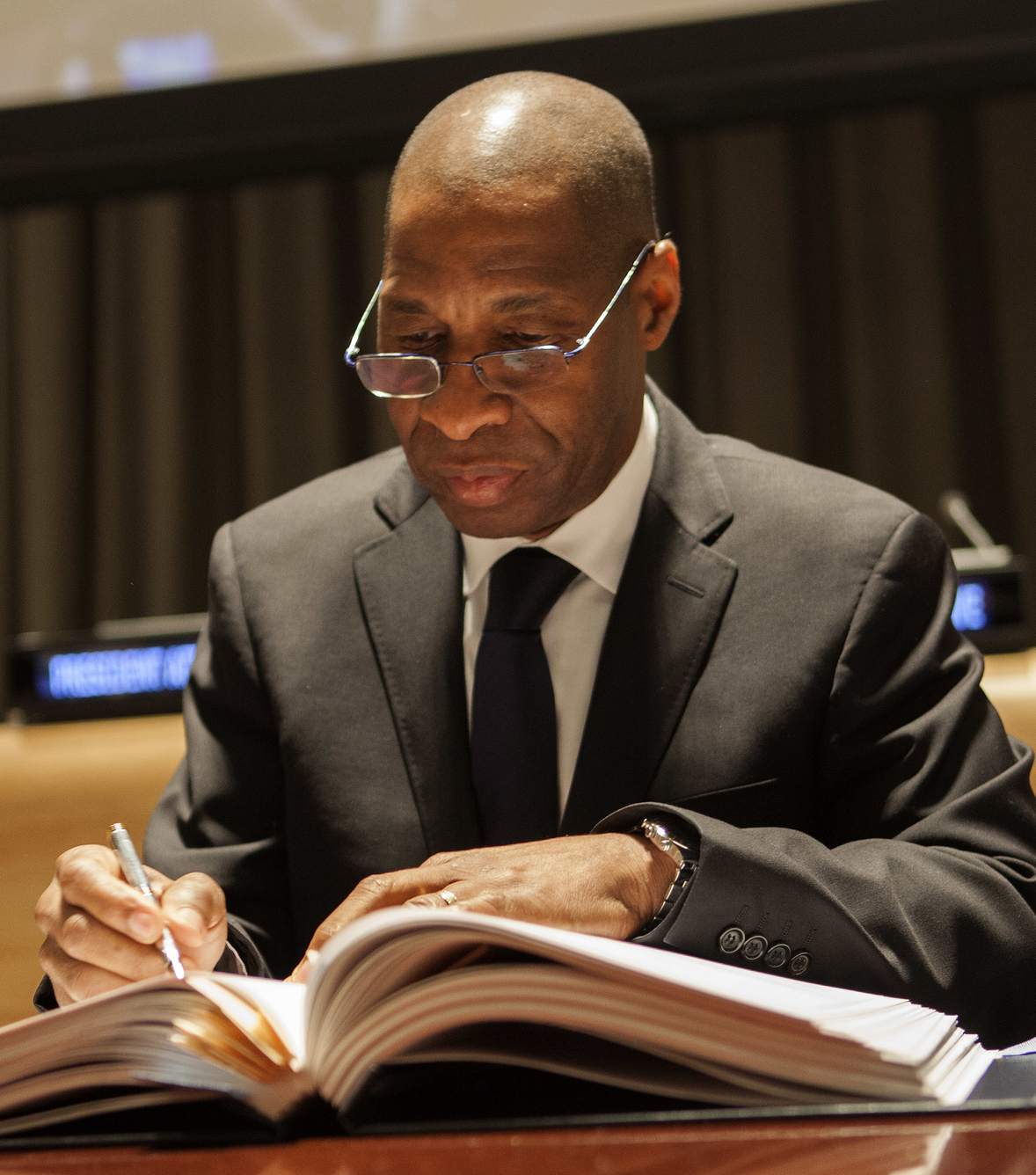
Bamba signing the Arms Trade Treaty during a ceremony at United Nations headquarters in New York, June 3, 2013.

Youssoufou Bamba (born 31 December 1949 - ) was an Ivorian diplomat. He served as the Permanent Representative of Côte d'Ivoire to the United Nations from 2010 to 2014; when he was appointed to the position by Alassane Ouattara after the latter claimed victory in the disputed presidential election of that year.

Prior to working in politics, Mr Bamba received degrees from Institut International d'Administration Publique and the University of Abidjan.

== Career ==
Bamba began his career in government in 1976 in the Ministry of Foreign Affairs, and eventually rose to the position of Assistant to the Minister for Foreign Affairs. In 1980 he began his first diplomatic deployment in the Ivorian embassy to Canada. In 1983, he was moved to the Ivory Coast's permanent mission in New York as Counsellor, where he worked for 5 years. On October 10, 2000, he was appointed Ivorian Ambassador to the United States, recalled on October 30, 2000 and left on October 31, 2001.

His later career consisted of numerous overseas postings as an Ambassador, in such countries as Japan, the United Kingdom, and Australia. He also worked with the International Atomic Energy Agency from 2007 until 2010.

During the unrest between President Alassane Ouattara and ousted leader Laurent Gbagbo, Bamba described the country as "on the verge of genocide" and, after peacekeeping forces withdrew, successfully negotiated the use of UAVs to patrol the border with Liberia.

He was fired from his post in the United Nations in March 2015 after the French magazine 'Jeune Afrique' quoted him as saying that West Sahara was ""the one territory that is not yet autonomous in Africa."
