= Cissé Mint Boide =

Mauritanian diplomat

Cissé Mint Cheikh Ould Boide is a Mauritanian designated as Mauritania’s Ambassador to the United States in March 2021. Former permanent representative to the United Nations Educational, Scientific and Cultural Organisation UNESCO in Paris and former Minister of Culture, Youth and Sports in Mauritania.

== Education and career ==
Cheikh Cisse Boide was born on January 1, 1970, in Nouakchott, Mauritania. She was designated as Mauritania’s Ambassador to the United States in March 2021.

Prior to her appointment as Mauritania’s Ambassador to the United States, Boide served as Mauritania’s Permanent Representative to UNESCO from 2019-2021. From 2014-2018 Boide worked as an international consultant in the policy and strategy field as well as management, project evaluation and sustainable development. She served as Mauritania’s Minister of Culture, Youth and Sports from 2009-2013. From 2007-2009, Boide was the Director of Tourism in Mauritania’s Ministry of Commerce, Craft, and Tourism.

Boide earned her Doctorate Degree in Strategic and Operational Management of Supply Logistics from the Institute of Industrial Management in Lille, France. Boide studied at the University of Lille where she obtained a Level Diploma in Tourism Development and Planning Areas, Culture and Sport and holds a Bachelor’s degree in Administration and Management in Tourism and Hotel enterprises from the International Institute of Tourism in Tangier, Morocco, ISIT from 1988 to 1992.

Boide had a stint in the tourism sector of Mauritania and was a Deputy Director of the National Tourist Office where she participated in tourism fairs and publicized Mauritania as a tourist destination from 2002 to 2007 before rising to the position of Director of Tourism coordinating National Strategy for Tourism Development from 2007 to 2009. She was appointed Minister of Culture, Youth and Sport by Prime Minister Moulaye Ould Mohamed Laghdaf from 2009 to 2013. In 2018, she was appointed Mauritania ambassador to the UNESCO and was later transferred to America.

Boide comes from an influential family in Mauritania and is well-connected with Mauritanian leadership, particularly in the military. Her father was one of the country’s first colonels, and her brother is a general in the military.

Boide is married to a US Citizen originally from Mauritania Mohamed Amar doctor in physics and chemistry, and has a 22-year-old son. In 2013, Boide was removed as Minister of Culture, Youth, and Sports after her then ex-husband was implicated in a corruption scandal whereby, he allegedly used personal favors to win the bid for constructing a stadium in Nouadhibou. Her former husband was neither charged nor fully cleared of impropriety in the affair. He withdrew his bid after public outcry. Boide was not personally implicated in the investigation related to her ex-husband but was nevertheless removed from her office.

She is fluent in French and Arabic, with good English and Spanish.
