= Embassy of Eswatini, Washington, D.C. =

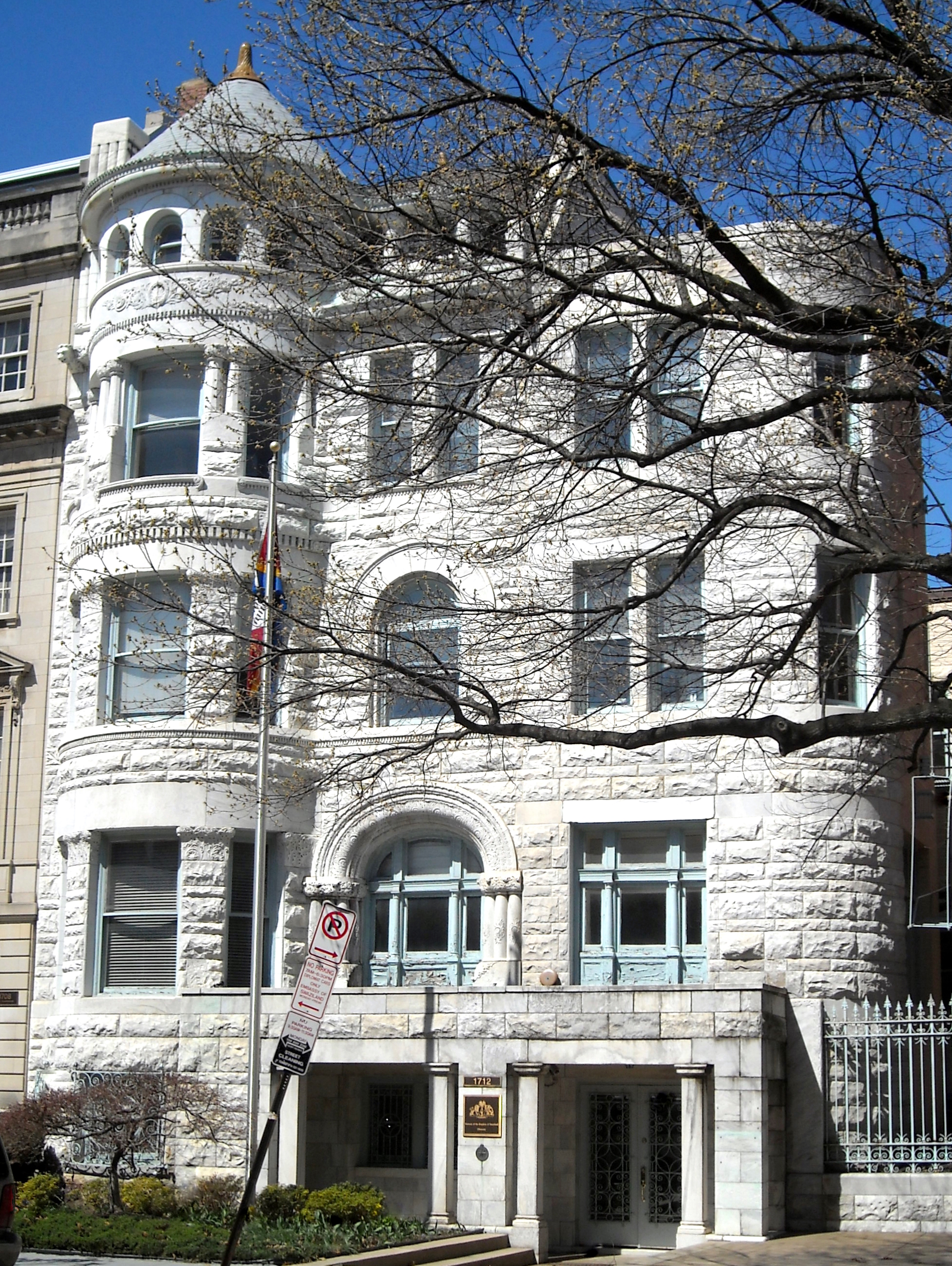
- Location: Washington, D.C.
- Address: 1712 New Hampshire Avenue, N.W.
- Coordinates: 38°54′47″N 77°2′26″W
- Ambassador: Kennedy F. Groening Njabuliso B. Gwebu (former) Ephraim M. Hlophe (former)

The Embassy of Eswatini in Washington, D.C. is the Kingdom of Eswatini's diplomatic mission to the United States. It's located at 1712 New Hampshire Avenue, Northwest, Washington, D.C., in the Dupont Circle neighborhood.

The Ambassador is Kennedy Groening. He also is accredited as non-resident ambassador to Argentina, Brazil, Canada, Chile, and Venezuela.

== Building ==
Constructed in 1894, the five-story Richardsonian Romanesque row house is a contributing property to the Dupont Circle Historic District and valued at $5,830,940. The Kingdom of Eswatini purchased the building from the Air Conditioning Contractors of America in December 2000. Additional past owners of the property include Emily Burns Mitchell, Kathryn C. Robinson, the government of the Pahlavi dynasty (embassy), the government of Ecuador (embassy), the government of Italy (high commission), and the Jewish War Veterans of the United States of America from 1954-1984.
