= Jane Waetara =

Government official in the Solomon Islands

Jane Waetara (born 1962) is a diplomat and government official in the Solomon Islands. She became Permanent Representative of the Solomon Islands to the United Nations on 16 June 2022 and also serves as the Solomon Islands' Ambassador to the United States and High Commissioner to Canada.

== Biography ==
Jane Mugafalu Kabui Waetara was born in 1962 and raised in Manakwai in North Malaita. She completed a Bachelor of Arts in management and economics from the University of the South Pacific, Suva, Fiji and a Master's in business studies from Massey University, New Zealand.

She has previously held the positions of Permanent Secretary for the Ministry of Planning and Aid Coordination, and interim chief executive officer for the Solomon Island Ports Authority. In 2020, she was appointed Chief Electoral Officer of the Solomon Islands Electoral Commission Office (SIEO) and was the first woman in that role. She resigned in April 2022.
