= Lebohang K. Moleko =

Lesotho diplomat

Lebohang K. Moleko is a Lesotho diplomat. He has served as Lesotho's Ambassador to the United States and as Permanent Representative to the United Nations in New York. He served as President of the UNICEF Executive Board at the international level in 2004.
