= Maguy Maccario Doyle =

Monégasque diplomat

Her Excellency Maguy Maccario Doyle
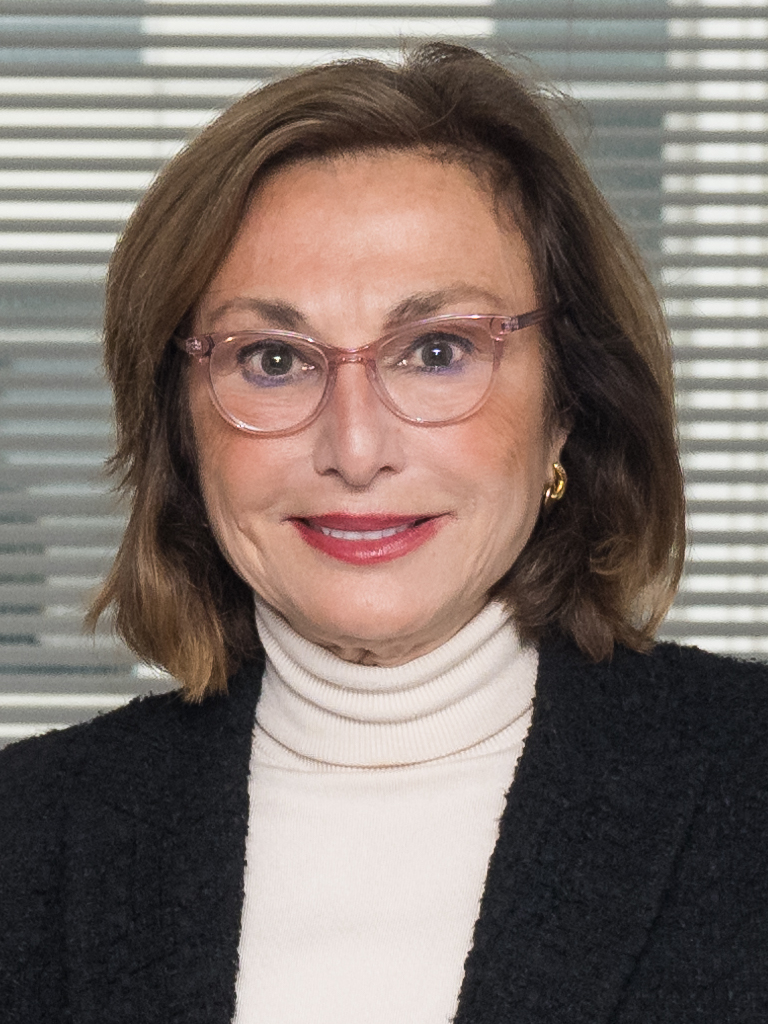
- 2023 portrait photo of Doyle during her visit to NASA headquarters in Washington.

2nd Monégasque Ambassador to the United States
- Incumbent
- Assumed office December 3, 2013
- Preceded by: Gilles Alexandre Noghès

1st Monégasque Ambassador to Canada
- Incumbent
- Assumed office December 23, 2014
- Preceded by: Gilles Alexandre Noghès

Maguy Maccario Doyle is Ambassador Extraordinary and Plenipotentiary of the Principality of Monaco to the United States and Canada, as of 2013 and 2014 respectively, and Monaco's Permanent Observer to the Organization of American States.

Maccario Doyle was appointed Ambassador of Monaco to the United States by Prince Albert II of Monaco on November 12, 2013, and presented her credentials to President Barack Obama on December 3 that same year. In December 2014, she presented her credentials to Canada's Governor General, H.E. David Johnston, assuming the positions both as Ambassador of Monaco to Canada, and as the Permanent Observer of Monaco to the OAS.

Prior to her current positions in Washington, Maccario Doyle had worked at the Monaco Government Tourist Office in New York since 1976, where she was appointed Director for North America in 1994.

Maccario Doyle became the first female Monégasque career consul ever when, in 1995, Prince Rainier III appointed her as consul of Monaco in New York, then consul general in 1997.

Distinctions received by Maccario Doyle at this time include the "Chevalier de l'Ordre de Saint-Charles" distinction, presented by Prince Rainier in 1996, and a gold medal from ALSAC/ St. Jude Children's Research Hospital for her support of its international programs in 1998. Maccario Doyle continues to work with St. Jude's, having served on their Professional Advisory Board since 2004. In 2011, she was appointed to the International Advisory Council for ALSAC.

Maccario Doyle was appointed by Prince Albert II as vice president of the US chapter of the Prince Albert II of Monaco Foundation-USA in 2008; during her tenure she launched local fundraising and awareness events and partnerships. She also created Monaco's Environmental Stewardship Gallery, an installation demonstrating the history and prospects of Monaco's environmental conservation efforts, which was displayed at various institutions in Chicago, New York, and Boston.

In May, 2016, Maccario Doyle was appointed President of the US chapter of the Princess Charlene of Monaco Foundation.
