= Embassy of Oman, Washington, D.C. =

Embassy of Oman
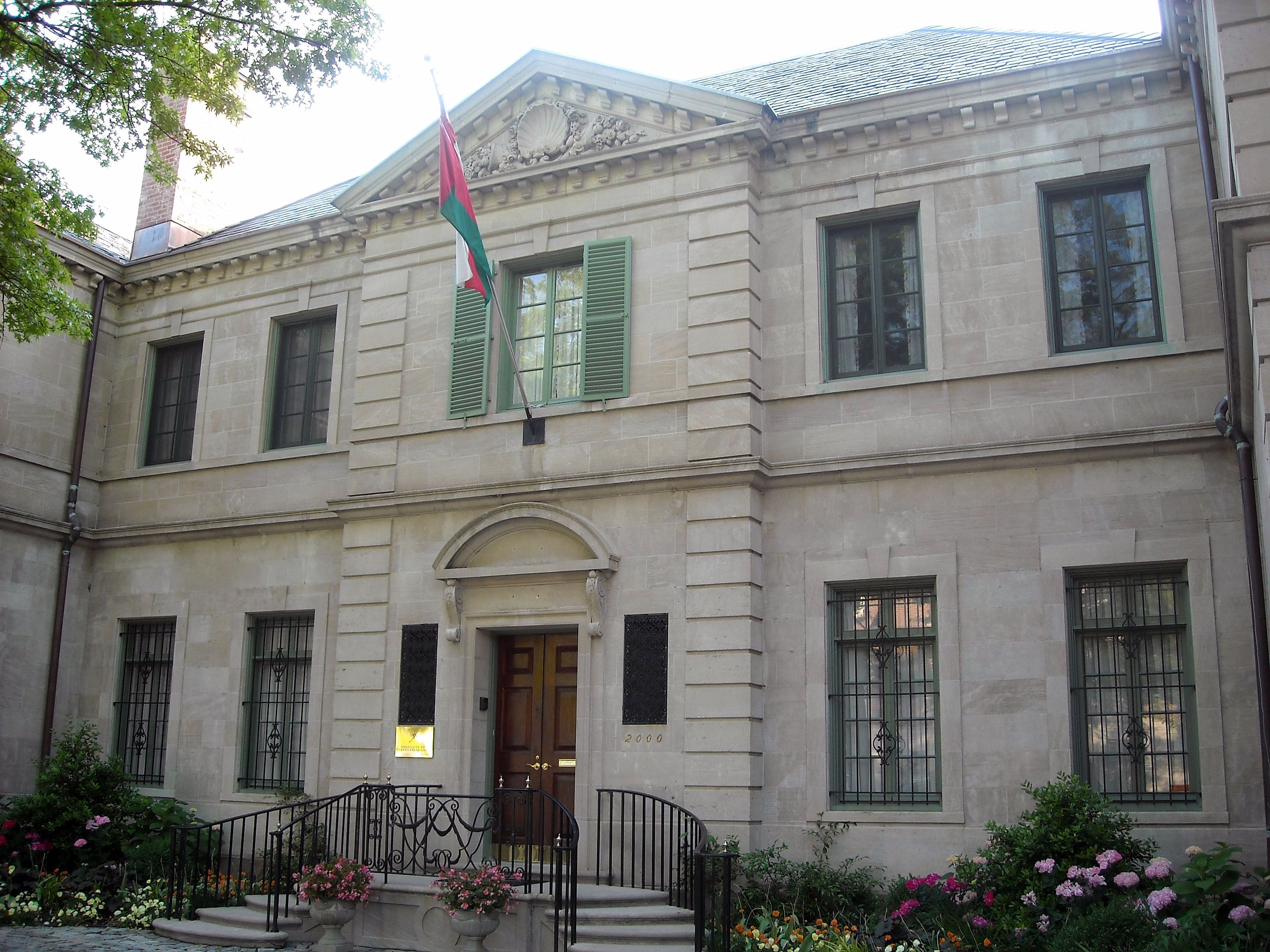
- Location: Washington, D.C.
- Address: 2535 Belmont Road, N.W.
- Coordinates: 38°55′3.6″N 77°3′21.8″W
- Ambassador: Hunaina Sultan Ahmed Al Mughairy

The Embassy of Oman in Washington, D.C. is the Sultanate of Oman's diplomatic mission to the United States. It is located at 2535 Belmont Road Northwest, Washington, D.C. in the Kalorama neighborhood.

The Ambassador is Talal Sulaiman Al Rahbi.
