= Foreign relations of Solomon Islands =

The foreign policy of Solomon Islands as of 2008 was described by the Solomon Islands government as a "look north" policy, aimed as strengthening diplomatic and economic relations with Asian countries for development purposes.

== Diplomatic representation ==
Countries with diplomatic missions in Solomon Islands are Australia, Japan, New Zealand, Papua New Guinea, South Korea and the United Kingdom. The U.S. ambassador resident in Port Moresby, Papua New Guinea is also accredited to Solomon Islands. Canada, France, Germany, South Korea, Sweden and Malaysia have Honorary Consuls.

Solomon Islands has diplomatic missions in Canberra, Papua New Guinea, at the United Nations in New York, where the ambassador there is also accredited as its ambassador to the United States of America, UNESCO in Paris and high commissioner to Canada and at the European Commission in Brussels where the representative is also accredited as High Commissioner to the UK.

== Diplomatic relations ==
List of countries which Solomon Islands maintains diplomatic relations with:

| # | Country | Date |
|---|---|---|
| 1 | Australia | 7 July 1978 |
| 2 | Canada | 7 July 1978 |
| 3 | Nauru | 7 July 1978 |
| 4 | New Zealand | 7 July 1978 |
| 5 | Papua New Guinea | 7 July 1978 |
| 6 | United Kingdom | 7 July 1978 |
| 7 | Germany | 11 July 1978 |
| 8 | Samoa | 17 July 1978 |
| 9 | Fiji | 28 July 1978 |
| 10 | Japan | 1 September 1978 |
| 11 | South Korea | 15 September 1978 |
| 12 | United States | 9 October 1978 |
| 13 | France | 12 October 1978 |
| 14 | Belgium | 28 February 1979 |
| 15 | Turkey | 8 March 1979 |
| 16 | Kiribati | 12 July 1979 |
| 17 | Sweden | 24 October 1979 |
| 18 | Tonga | 7 July 1980 |
| 19 | Vanuatu | 30 July 1980 |
| 20 | Spain | 8 August 1980 |
| 21 | Tuvalu | 1 October 1980 |
| 22 | Norway | 18 November 1980 |
| 23 | Netherlands | 1 February 1982 |
| 24 | Malaysia | 10 May 1983 |
| 25 | Indonesia | 28 July 1983 |
| — | Holy See | 9 May 1983 |
| 26 | Thailand | 2 May 1986 |
| 27 | Italy | 1 March 1987 |
| 26 | Singapore | 21 April 1987 |
| 29 | India | 1 May 1987 |
| 30 | Greece | 28 August 1987 |
| 31 | Israel | 1 January 1989 |
| 32 | Maldives | 18 October 1989 |
| 33 | Federated States of Micronesia | 5 April 1990 |
| 34 | Marshall Islands | 23 May 1990 |
| 35 | Brunei | 21 May 1992 |
| 36 | Kuwait | 18 October 1995 |
| 37 | Czech Republic | 30 October 1996 |
| 38 | Vietnam | 30 October 1996 |
| 39 | Portugal | 20 November 1996 |
| 40 | Guyana | 26 November 1996 |
| 41 | South Africa | 11 December 1996 |
| 42 | Finland | 16 July 1999 |
| 43 | Cuba | 19 December 2002 |
| 44 | Philippines | 27 September 2004 |
| 45 | Brazil | 2 August 2005 |
| 46 | Austria | 13 October 2005 |
| 47 | Iceland | 20 April 2007 |
| 48 | Venezuela | 8 May 2007 |
| 49 | Switzerland | 20 December 2007 |
| 50 | Mexico | 26 September 2008 |
| 51 | Palau | 25 September 2009 |
| 52 | Ireland | 4 December 2009 |
| 53 | United Arab Emirates | 29 April 2010 |
| 54 | Cyprus | 5 May 2010 |
| 55 | Botswana | 18 November 2010 |
| 56 | Slovenia | 18 November 2010 |
| 57 | Luxembourg | 19 November 2010 |
| 58 | Seychelles | 20 December 2010 |
| 59 | Egypt | 23 December 2010 |
| 60 | Malta | 23 December 2010 |
| 61 | Montenegro | 23 December 2010 |
| 62 | Romania | 1 February 2011 |
| 63 | Morocco | 4 February 2011 |
| 64 | Uruguay | 4 February 2011 |
| 65 | Azerbaijan | 8 February 2011 |
| 66 | Qatar | 8 February 2011 |
| 67 | Comoros | 14 February 2011 |
| 68 | Dominica | 7 March 2011 |
| 69 | Guatemala | 8 March 2011 |
| 70 | Georgia | 11 March 2011 |
| 71 | Slovakia | 15 March 2011 |
| 72 | Nicaragua | 20 April 2011 |
| 73 | Bulgaria | 27 April 2011 |
| 74 | Paraguay | 4 May 2011 |
| 75 | Saint Vincent and the Grenadines | 4 May 2011 |
| 76 | Albania | 19 May 2011 |
| 77 | Gambia | 19 May 2011 |
| 78 | Estonia | 25 May 2011 |
| 79 | Cape Verde | 26 May 2011 |
| 80 | Hungary | 21 June 2011 |
| 81 | Eritrea | 27 June 2011 |
| 82 | Guinea | 11 August 2011 |
| 83 | Ukraine | 27 September 2011 |
| 84 | Mongolia | 13 October 2011 |
| 85 | Mauritania | 18 October 2011 |
| 86 | Nepal | 15 December 2011 |
| 87 | Ecuador | 20 December 2011 |
| 88 | Timor-Leste | 21 December 2011 |
| 89 | Ethiopia | 22 December 2011 |
| 90 | Bosnia and Herzegovina | 26 January 2012 |
| 91 | Tajikistan | 21 February 2012 |
| 92 | Cambodia | 22 February 2012 |
| 93 | Republic of the Congo | 6 March 2012 |
| 94 | Monaco | 6 March 2012 |
| 95 | Poland | 6 March 2012 |
| 96 | Peru | 14 March 2012 |
| 97 | Croatia | 18 April 2012 |
| 98 | Moldova | 4 May 2012 |
| 99 | Algeria | 7 June 2012 |
| 100 | Latvia | 28 June 2012 |
| 101 | Suriname | 10 August 2012 |
| 102 | Kazakhstan | 17 August 2012 |
| 103 | Belarus | 10 September 2012 |
| 104 | Panama | 11 September 2012 |
| 105 | Burundi | 13 September 2012 |
| 106 | Lithuania | 20 September 2012 |
| 107 | Liechtenstein | 2012 |
| 108 | Jamaica | 3 July 2013 |
| 109 | Sri Lanka | 3 July 2013 |
| 110 | El Salvador | 22 July 2013 |
| — | Cook Islands | 1 September 2013 |
| 111 | Antigua and Barbuda | 11 September 2013 |
| 112 | Grenada | 2 April 2014 |
| 113 | Trinidad and Tobago | 31 May 2014 |
| 114 | Saudi Arabia | 17 July 2014 |
| 115 | Kyrgyzstan | 22 December 2014 |
| 116 | Pakistan | 19 February 2016 |
| 117 | Mauritius | 1 July 2016 |
| 118 | Argentina | 29 July 2016 |
| 119 | Saint Lucia | 25 September 2018 |
| 120 | China | 21 September 2019 |
| 121 | Serbia | 20 December 2021 |
| 122 | Barbados | 19 September 2022 |
| 123 | Bahrain | 21 September 2022 |
| 124 | Chile | 19 September 2023 |
| 125 | Oman | 19 September 2023 |
| 126 | Dominican Republic | 21 September 2023 |
| 127 | Belize | 22 September 2023 |
| 128 | Uganda | 27 November 2023 |
| 129 | Bahamas | 15 March 2024 |
| 130 | Colombia | 23 September 2024 |
| 131 | Rwanda | 23 September 2024 |
| 132 | San Marino | 4 April 2025 |
| 133 | Armenia | 14 May 2025 |
| 134 | Benin | 22 August 2025 |
| 135 | North Macedonia | 23 September 2025 |
| 136 | Andorra | 24 September 2025 |
| 137 | Zimbabwe | 2 March 2026 |
| 138 | Ghana | 21 September 2026 |
| 139 | Kenya | 21 September 2026 |

== Bilateral relations ==
=== Current ===
| Country | Notes |
|---|---|
| Australia | See Australia–Solomon Islands relations Australia became the first country to establish diplomatic relations after the Solomon Islands became independent on 7 July 1978. Australia is the Solomon Islands' largest developmental partner and a key trading partner. Following the outbreak of conflict between the Guadalcanal and Malaitan peoples in 1998, Australia led a multinational peacekeeping and developmental assistance force known as RAMSI, which operated in the Solomons between 2003 and 2017. Australia is also a key security partner, signing a bilateral security treaty with the Solomons in mid August 2017. The two countries experienced several bilateral disagreements including the Julian Moti affair in 2006-2007 and a 2022 Chinese-Solomon Islands security pact. |
| China | See China–Solomon Islands relations On 16 September 2019, after bribing government officials, Solomon Islands parliament voted to end diplomatic recognition of Taiwan and to recognise China (PRC). Taiwan subsequently closed its embassy in Honiara on 17 September 2019. The new arrangement with PRC remained to be ratified on 19 September but is expected to proceed. Following this move, a provincial leader had offered to lease the island of Tulagi to China in a deal that the attorney general found to be illegal. In late March 2022, the Solomon Islands Government confirmed that it was drafting a security pact with China that would allow the deployment of Chinese military and security forces in the country, naval deployments, and the establishment of a military base. This acknowledgement came after a draft of the security agreement was leaked online. In response, the Australian and New Zealand Governments expressed concerns that the establishment of a Chinese military presence in Solomon Islands would have serious implications for peace and security in the Pacific region. In response, the Chinese Government defended law enforcement and bilateral cooperation with Solomon Islands and disputed Australian criticism that Beijing was coercing Solomon Islands. |
| Cuba | See Cuba–Solomon Islands relations In the late 2000s, Solomon Islands began to strengthen their relations with Cuba. In April 2007, the Solomon Star reported that Solomon Islands' high commissioner to the United Nations was soon to be sworn in as ambassador to Cuba. In September 2007, it was announced that 40 Cuban doctors would be sent to Solomon Islands. The Solomons’ Minister of Foreign Affairs Patterson Oti said that Solomon Islander doctors would "learn from their Cuban colleagues in specialised areas". In addition to providing doctors, Cuba provided scholarships for 50 Solomon Islanders to study medicine in Cuba for free. In September 2008, Solomon Islands' foreign minister William Haomae attended the first Cuba-Pacific Islands ministerial meeting in Havana, aimed at "strengthening cooperation", notably in coping with the impact of climate change. In July 2014, Solomon Islands prime minister Gordon Darcy Lilo opened Solomon Islands embassy in Havana, thus becoming the first Pacific Island country to have an embassy and resident ambassador in Cuba. |
| Cyprus | Both countries established diplomatic relations on 5 May 2010.; Cyprus is represented in Solomon Islands via parallel accreditation of its embassy in Canberra, Australia.; Both countries are full members of Commonwealth of Nations. |
| Fiji | See Fiji–Solomon Islands relations In August 2008, it was announced that Solomon Islands intended to open a High Commission in Suva, and in December the government of Fiji announced that it had "formally endorsed the establishment of a Resident Diplomatic Mission in Suva by the Government of Solomon Islands". Fiji's High Commission to Papua New Guinea is accredited to Solomon Islands. |
| Greece | Both countries established diplomatic relations in 1987.; Greece is represented in Solomon Islands via parallel accreditation of its embassy in Canberra, Australia. |
| India | See India–Solomon Islands relations Diplomatic relations between India and Solomon Islands were established in May 1987. |
| Japan | Diplomatic relations between Japan and Solomon Islands were established on 7 July 1978, the date the Solomon Islands became independent. Japan maintains an embassy at Honiara. |
| Malaysia | See Malaysia–Solomon Islands relations Malaysia has an honorary consul in Solomon Islands while Malaysia high commission in Port Moresby also accredited to the country, and Solomon Islands has a high commission in Kuala Lumpur. |
| Maldives | Both countries established diplomatic relations on 18 October 1989.; Both countries are full members of Commonwealth of Nations. |
| Netherlands | The Netherlands is represented in Solomon Islands by its embassy in Canberra, Australia.; Solomon Islands is represented in the Netherlands by its embassy in Brussels, Belgium. |
| New Zealand | See New Zealand–Solomon Islands relations The Solomon Islands and New Zealand established diplomatic relations on 7 July 1978. New Zealand is represented in Solomon Islands by its High Commission in Honiara. Solomon Islands is represented in New Zealand by its High Commission in Wellington. |
| Pakistan | Solomon Islands and Pakistan established foreign relations in February 2016, when high commissioner designate Naela Chohan, Pakistan's ambassador resident in Canberra, arrived in Honiara to sign an accord with minister for foreign affairs Milner Tozaka for the formal establishment of diplomatic ties. A Joint Communique issued by the two senior officials remarked upon numerous areas of cooperation, including education, and policing, as well as bilateral trade ties. |
| Papua New Guinea | Relations between the current governments of Prime Minister Derek Sikua (Solomon Islands) and prime minister Michael Somare (Papua New Guinea) are, at present, cordial. |
| South Korea | Solomon Islands and the Republic of Korea have established diplomatic relations on September 15, 1978.: Solomon Islands and South Korea have nice diplomatic relations. |
| Switzerland | Solomon Islands and Switzerland established formal diplomatic relations on 20 December 2007, when representatives of both nations signed a joint communiqué in Canberra. Beraki Jino, High Commissioner of Solomon Islands to Australia, and Christian Muhlethaler, Ambassador of Switzerland to Australia, signed the agreement on behalf of their respective governments. |
| Turkey | See Solomon Islands–Turkey relations: Turkish ambassador in Canberra to Australia is also accredited to Solomon Islands.; Trade volume between the two countries was negligible in 2019. |
| Ukraine | Ukraine is represented in Solomon Islands by its embassy in Canberra, Australia. |
| United Kingdom | See Solomon Islands–United Kingdom relations The Solomon Islands established diplomatic relations with the United Kingdom on 7 July 1978. Both countries are Commonwealth Realms.: Solomon Islands does not maintain a high commission in the United Kingdom.; The United Kingdom is accredited to the Solomon Islands through its high commission in Honiara.; The UK governed the Solomon Islands from 1893 until 1978, when the Solomon Islands achieved full independence. Both countries share common membership of the Commonwealth, and the World Trade Organization, as well as the Pacific States–United Kingdom Economic Partnership Agreement. Bilaterally the two countries have a Double Taxation Agreement. The British Solomon Islands Protectorate was one of the last areas of the British Empire to gain independence. The official name was changed from British Solomon Islands Protectorate to Solomon Islands in 1975. Self-government was granted in 1976 also under that name. On achieving full independence as a sovereign state in 1978, the two countries immediately established diplomatic relations. King Charles III is, severally, the head of state of both the United Kingdom and Solomon Islands. Although the two offices are vested in the same person, he exercises his role as King of Solomon Islands independently of his role as the King of the United Kingdom, consequently, the United Kingdom itself has no jurisdiction in Solomon Islands. Both the United Kingdom and Solomon Islands are members of the Commonwealth of Nations, and participate in events such as the Commonwealth Games. Bilateral relations with the UK remain strong. The UK's bilateral aid programme in Solomon Islands ended in early 2004 when the UK's regional aid programme came to a close. However, UK funding through the EU, the largest multilateral donor to Solomon Islands, will continue. The UK contributes almost 15% of the EU development budget in Solomon Islands. The Foreign and Commonwealth Office assistance to Solomon Islands is focused on security sector reform, good governance, sustainable development and poverty alleviation. Among the activities supported in the last two years are: education on HIV/AIDS, rural clinics, collective farming and empowerment of women. Sir Nathaniel Waena, the Governor-General of Solomon Islands, visited the UK in 2006 to celebrate the Queen's 80th Birthday. Assistance is also provided through the Commonwealth of Nations, whose budget is supported by the United Kingdom. The United Kingdom is one of only six countries to maintain a resident ambassador in Honiara, the High Commissioner of the United Kingdom to Solomon Islands. The current High Commissioner, since 2016, is David Ward. The British High Commission in Honiara represents British interests in the country and assists British citizens resident in, or visiting the country. The High Commission also funds local projects and assists in scholarships in the United Kingdom for Solomon Islands citizens. Solomon Islands is represented in the European Commission in Brussels, Belgium, by the Solomon Islands Ambassador, who is also accredited as High Commissioner to the United Kingdom. |
| United States | See Solomon Islands–United States relations: Solomon Islands are accredited to the United States from its Permanent Mission to the United Nations in New York City.; United States has an embassy in Honiara. |
| Venezuela | In October 2008, Solomon Islands prime minister Derek Sikua moved to establish economic relations with Venezuela, hoping to benefit from comparatively cheap Venezuelan oil. In a rare display of bipartisanship, Solomons Opposition leader Manasseh Sogavare praised his political rival for this move, stating that -in the context of the 2008 financial crisis, it would bring down the price of oil for Solomon Islanders, and boost the economy if the Solomons imported crude Venezuelan oil, refined it and then exported it to neighbouring countries. |

=== Former bilateral relations ===
| Country | Formal Relations Began | Formal Relations Ended | Notes |
|---|---|---|---|
| Kosovo | 28 April 2015 | 28 November 2018 | Solomon Islands recognized Kosovo as an independent state on 13 August 2014, and established diplomatic relations with Kosovo on 28 April 2015. However, it withdrew its decision to recognize Kosovo as an independent state on 28 November 2018. |
| Republic of China | 24 March 1983 | 14 September 2019 | See Solomon Islands–Taiwan relations Solomon Islands maintained diplomatic relations with Republic of China (Taiwan) from 24 March 1983 with resident diplomatic missions in both respective capitals. In April 2017, Solomon Islands Deputy Prime Minister Manasseh Maelanga visited Taiwan and met with President Tsai Ing-wen at the Presidential Office Building in Taipei. Both of them discussed exchanges and future cooperation between the two sides. However, on 14 September 2019, the Solomon Islands parliament voted to recognize the People's Republic of China instead of the Republic of China. The Republic of China in response cut all ties to the Pacific nation, closing its embassy in Honiara on 17 September 2019. On 21 September 2019, Solomon Islands and the People's Republic of China issued a joint communiqué establishing relations. |

== Main multilateral involvement ==
Solomon Islands is a member of the United Nations, UNESCO, the Commonwealth, South Pacific Commission, Pacific Islands Forum, International Monetary Fund, and the European Economic Community/African, Caribbean, Pacific Group (EEC/ACP)/(Lomé Convention).

== International organisation participation ==
OACPS, AsDB, ESCAP, FAO, Commonwealth of Nations, G-77, IBRD, ICAO, ICRM, IDA, IFAD, IFC, IFRCS, ILO, IMF, IMO, Intelsat (nonsignatory user), IOC, ITU, PIF, Sparteca, PC, United Nations, UNCTAD, UNESCO, UPU, WFTU, WHO, WMO, WTO

== See also ==
- List of ambassadors of the Solomon Islands to China
- List of ambassadors of the Solomon Islands to Taiwan
- List of high commissioners of the United Kingdom to the Solomon Islands
- List of ambassadors of the Solomon Islands to the United States
- List of diplomatic missions in Solomon Islands
- List of diplomatic missions of Solomon Islands
- Minister of Foreign Affairs (Solomon Islands)
