= Timeline of United States diplomatic relations =

The following is a timeline of major dates in U.S. diplomatic history, specifically the establishment or severance of official diplomatic relations, the diplomatic recognition of sovereign countries, and the opening or closure of diplomatic posts.

== 18th century ==
- February 6, 1778 – France recognizes the United States as an independent state with the signing of the Treaty of Amity and Commerce.
- August 6, 1778 – The United States establishes diplomatic relations with France.
- March 23, 1779 – The United States establishes a diplomatic mission in Paris.
- April 19, 1782 – The Netherlands recognizes the United States. The United States and the Netherlands establish diplomatic relations when U.S. Minister John Adams presents his credentials at The Hague.
- February 20, 1783 – The Spanish Empire recognizes the United States.
- April 3, 1783 – Sweden recognizes the United States as an independent state with the signing of the Treaty of Amity and Commerce.
- September 3, 1783 – The United Kingdom of Great Britain and Ireland formally recognizes the independence of the United States with the signing of the Treaty of Paris of 1783.
- June 1, 1785 – The United States and the United Kingdom establish diplomatic relations when John Adams presented his credentials as Minister Plenipotentiary to King George III.
- September 18, 1785 – The Kingdom of Prussia recognizes the United States with the signing of the Treaty of Amity and Commerce.
- June 23, 1786 – Morocco recognizes the United States.
- October 25, 1791 – The Republic of Genoa recognizes the United States.
- May 13, 1791 – Portugal recognizes the United States. The United States establishes diplomatic relations with Portugal.
- June 9, 1792 – Denmark recognizes the United States.
- September 5, 1795 – The Regency of Algiers recognizes the United States.
- 1797 – The Austrian Empire recognizes the United States.

== 19th century ==
- October 12, 1801 – The United States establishes diplomatic relations with Denmark.
- October 28, 1803 – The Russian Empire recognizes the United States.
- July 14, 1809 – The United States and the Russian Empire formally establish diplomatic relations.
- June 18, 1812 – The United States severs diplomatic relations with the United Kingdom in the wake of the War of 1812.
- August 8, 1815 – The United States and the United Kingdom re-establish diplomatic relations when John Quincy Adams presents his credentials in London as Envoy Extraordinary and Minister Plenipotentiary.
- June 19, 1822 – The United States recognizes Colombia.
- December 12, 1822 – The United States recognizes Mexico as an independent state. The United States and Mexico establish diplomatic relations.
- January 27, 1823 – The United States recognizes Argentina and Chile.
- May 26, 1824 – The United States recognizes Brazil and establishes diplomatic relations.
- May 2, 1826 – The United States recognizes Peru.
- May 21, 1827 – The United States establishes diplomatic relations with Peru.
- February 11, 1830 – The United States and the Ottoman Empire formally recognize each other.
- September 13, 1831 – The United States and the Ottoman Empire establish diplomatic relations.
- January 6, 1832 – The United States recognizes Belgium.
- June 18, 1832 – The United States establishes diplomatic relations with Belgium.
- September 21, 1833 – The United States and the Sultanate of Oman formally recognize each other.
- February 28, 1835 – The United States recognizes Venezuela.
- June 30, 1835 – The United States establishes diplomatic relations with Venezuela.
- June 16, 1844 – The United States and China formally recognize each other and establish diplomatic relations.
- Spring 1846 – The United States and Mexico sever diplomatic relations in the wake of the Mexican-American War.
- December 4, 1848 – The United States and Mexico re-establish diplomatic relations, following the signing of the Treaty of Guadalupe-Hidalgo.
- June 28, 1850 – The United States and Iran formally recognize each other.
- March 31, 1854 – The United States and Japan formally recognize each other.
- July 29, 1858 – The United States and Japan establish full diplomatic relations with the signing of the Treaty of Amity and Commerce.
- April 11, 1861 – The United States recognizes the Kingdom of Italy. The United States and Italy establish diplomatic relations.
- May 7, 1861 – The United States recognizes San Marino.
- September 23, 1862 – The United States formally recognizes Liberia.
- February 23, 1864 – The United States establishes diplomatic relations with Liberia.
- January 18, 1871 – The United States recognizes the German Empire.
- May 31, 1878 – The United States recognizes Luxembourg.
- April 7, 1881 – The United States recognizes the Kingdom of Romania.
- October 14, 1881 – The United States recognizes the Kingdom of Serbia.
- October 23, 1882 – The United States and the Kingdom of Siam establish diplomatic relations.
- November 12, 1882 – The United States establishes diplomatic relations with Serbia.
- May 20, 1883 – The United States establishes diplomatic relations with the Kingdom of Choson.
- March 20, 1883 – In their first diplomatic interaction, the United States and the Kingdom of Siam sign a Treaty of Amity and Commerce.
- June 11, 1883 – The United States establishes diplomatic relations with Iran.
- March 30, 1893 – The United States appoints Thomas F. Bayard as the first U.S. diplomat with the rank of Ambassador.

== Early 20th century ==
- May 27, 1902 – The United States establishes diplomatic relations with Cuba.
- July 17, 1903 – The United States establishes diplomatic relations with Luxembourg.
- November 1903 – The United States recognizes Panama and establishes diplomatic relations.
- December 27, 1903 – The United States establishes diplomatic relations with the Ethiopian Empire.
- March 8, 1905 – The United States establishes diplomatic relations with Morocco.
- October 30, 1905 – The United States recognizes Norway following its separation from Sweden.
- May 3, 1909 – The United States recognizes Bulgaria.
- February 3, 1917 – The United States severs diplomatic relations with Germany.
- April 8, 1917 – The Austro-Hungarian Empire severs diplomatic relations with the United States.
- April 20, 1917 – The Ottoman Empire severs diplomatic relations with the United States.
- September 3, 1918 – The United States recognizes Czechoslovakia.
- January 22, 1919 – The United States recognizes Poland.
- May 2, 1919 – The United States establishes diplomatic relations with Poland.
- May 7, 1919 – The United States recognizes Finland.
- May 27, 1919 – The United States establishes diplomatic relations with Finland.
- July 26, 1921 – The United States recognizes Afghanistan.
- August 24, 1921 – The United States recognizes the Republic of Austria and establishes diplomatic relations.
- August 29, 1921 – The United States and Hungary sign a treaty establishing diplomatic relations.
- December 10, 1921 – The United States re-establishes diplomatic relations with Germany.
- July 28, 1922 – The United States recognizes Estonia, Latvia, and Lithuania.
- December 4, 1922 – The United States establishes diplomatic relations with Albania.
- June 28, 1924 – The United States recognizes the Irish Free State.
- October 7, 1924 – The United States establishes diplomatic relations with Ireland.
- February 17, 1927 – The United States establishes diplomatic relations with the newly-formed Republic of Turkey.
- February 18, 1927 – The United States recognizes Canada as an independent state. The United States and Canada establish diplomatic relations.
- July 25, 1928 – The United States recognizes the Nationalist Government of the Republic of China.
- November 5, 1929 – The United States recognizes the Union of South Africa and establishes diplomatic relations.
- January 9, 1930 – The United States recognizes the Kingdom of Iraq.
- March 30, 1931 – The United States establishes diplomatic relations with Iraq.
- May 1, 1931 – The United States recognizes the Kingdom of Hejaz and Nejd.
- November 16, 1933 – The United States formally recognizes the government of the Soviet Union (USSR).
- May 4, 1935 – The United States establishes diplomatic relations with Afghanistan.
- June 5, 1939 – After the Italian invasion of Albania, the United States and Albania sever diplomatic relations.

== 1940s ==
- January 8, 1940 – The United States establishes diplomatic relations with Australia.
- February 4, 1940 – The United States establishes diplomatic relations with Saudi Arabia.
- September 30, 1941 – The United States establishes diplomatic relations with Iceland.
- December 8, 1941 – Following Japan's attack on Pearl Harbor, the United States and Japan sever diplomatic relations.
- December 11, 1941 – Nazi Germany, Fascist Italy, and Hungary sever diplomatic relations with the United States.
- December 12, 1941 – Romania severs diplomatic relations with the United States.
- December 13, 1941 – Bulgaria severs diplomatic relations with the United States.
- February 16, 1942 – The United States recognizes New Zealand and establishes diplomatic relations.
- November 8, 1942 – Vichy France severs diplomatic relations with the United States.
- June 17, 1944 – The United States formally recognizes Iceland as an independent republic.
- June 30, 1944 – The United States severs diplomatic relations with Finland.
- October 16, 1944 – The United States and Italy re-establish diplomatic relations.
- December 1, 1944 – Following the liberation of Paris, the U.S. embassy in Paris re-opens.
- July 31, 1945 – The U.S. embassy in Warsaw, Poland re-opens.
- September 1, 1945 – The United States and Finland re-establish diplomatic relations.
- September 25, 1945 – The United States and Hungary re-establish diplomatic relations.
- October 24, 1945 – The United States joins the United Nations.
- January 21, 1946 – The United States and Austria re-establish diplomatic relations.
- October 1, 1946 – The United States and Romania re-establish diplomatic relations.
- July 4, 1946 – The United States recognizes the Philippines with the signing of the Treaty of Manila. The United States and the Philippines establish diplomatic relations.
- November 1, 1946 – The United States establishes diplomatic relations with India.
- August 15, 1947 – The United States formally recognizes India and Pakistan
- September 27, 1947 – The United States and Bulgaria re-establish diplomatic relations.
- February 4, 1948 – The United States recognizes Ceylon.
- May 14, 1948 – The United States recognizes Israel.
- October 29, 1948 – The United States establishes diplomatic relations with Ceylon.
- January 1, 1949 – The United States recognizes the Republic of Korea.
- January 31, 1949 – The United States recognizes Jordan.
- February 18, 1949 – The United States establishes diplomatic relations with Jordan.
- March 25, 1949 – The United States establishes diplomatic relations with the Republic of Korea.
- March 28, 1949 – The United States establishes diplomatic relations with Israel.
- July 25, 1949 – The United States joins NATO.
- December 28, 1949 – The United States recognizes Indonesia and establishes diplomatic relations.

== 1950s ==
- February 7, 1950 – The United States recognizes the State of Vietnam, the Kingdom of Cambodia, and the Kingdom of Laos.
- February 20, 1950 – Bulgaria severs diplomatic relations with the United States.
- April 28, 1952 – The United States and Japan re-establish diplomatic relations, following postwar Allied occupation of Japan.
- May 6, 1955 – The United States establishes diplomatic relations with West Germany.
- August 31, 1957 – The United States recognizes the Federation of Malaya and establishes diplomatic relations.
- March 24, 1959 – The United States and Bulgaria re-establish diplomatic relations.

== 1960s ==
- July 1, 1960 – The United States recognizes the Somali Republic and establishes diplomatic relations.
- September 24, 1960 – The United States recognizes Senegal and establishes diplomatic relations.
- October 1, 1960 – The United States recognizes the Federation of Nigeria and establishes diplomatic relations.
- September 22, 1961 – The United States establishes diplomatic relations with Kuwait.
- July 3, 1962 – The United States recognizes Algeria as an independent state.
- September 29, 1962 – The United States establishes diplomatic relations with Algeria.
- December 12, 1963 – The United States recognizes Kenya.
- March 2, 1964 – The United States establishes diplomatic relations with Kenya.
- August 11, 1965 – The United States recognizes Singapore.
- April 4, 1966 – The United States establishes diplomatic relations with Singapore.
- June 6, 1967 – Algeria, Egypt, Iraq, and Syria sever diplomatic relations with the United States, in the wake of the 1967 Arab-Israeli War.

== 1970s ==
- September 5, 1971 – The United States recognizes Qatar.
- December 3, 1971 – The United States recognizes the United Arab Emirates.
- March 19, 1972 – The United States establishes diplomatic relations with Qatar.
- March 20, 1972 – The United States establishes diplomatic relations with the United Arab Emirates.
- April 4, 1972 – The United States recognizes Bangladesh.
- April 17, 1972 – The United States establishes diplomatic relations with Oman.
- May 18, 1972 – The United States establishes diplomatic relations with Bangladesh.
- July 10, 1973 – The United States formally recognizes the Bahamas. The United States and the Bahamas establish diplomatic relations.
- September 4, 1974 – The United States establishes diplomatic relations with East Germany.
- November 12, 1974 – The United States and Algeria re-establish diplomatic relations.
- April 12, 1975 – The United States closes its embassy in Phnom Penh, Cambodia.
- April 29, 1975 – The United States closes its embassy in Saigon.
- July 7, 1978 – The United States recognizes the Solomon Islands.
- October 9, 1978 – The United States and the Solomon Islands establish diplomatic relations.
- January 1, 1979 – The United States recognizes the People's Republic of China. The U.S. embassy relocates from Taipei to Beijing.

== 1980s ==
- April 7, 1980 – The United States severs diplomatic relations with Iran.
- April 18, 1980 – The United States formally recognizes and establishes diplomatic relations with Zimbabwe.
- April 28, 1980 – The U.S. consulate general in Shanghai re-opens.
- January 10, 1984 – The United States formally recognizes the Holy See when President Ronald Reagan and Pope John Paul II agree to the establishment of diplomatic relations.
- November 26, 1984 – The United States and Iraq resume diplomatic relations.
- October 21, 1986 – The United States recognizes the Marshall Islands and establishes diplomatic relations.
- November 3, 1986 – The United States recognizes Micronesia and establishes diplomatic relations.
- January 27, 1987 – The United States establishes diplomatic relations with the People's Republic of Mongolia.
- January 30, 1989 – The U.S. embassy in Kabul, Afghanistan closes.

== 1990s ==
- March 21, 1990 – The United States recognizes Namibia and establishes diplomatic relations.
- January 5, 1991 – The U.S. embassy in Mogadishu, Somalia closes in the wake of the Somali Civil War.
- February 9, 1991 – Iraq severs diplomatic relations with the United States, following the Iraqi invasion of Kuwait.
- March 15, 1991 – The United States and Albania re-establish diplomatic relations.
- December 25, 1991 – The United States recognizes the Russian Federation. The United States also recognizes the newly independent states of Armenia, Azerbaijan, Belarus, Georgia, Kazakhstan, Kyrgyzstan, Moldova, Tajikistan, Turkmenistan, Ukraine, and Uzbekistan.
- December 31, 1991 – The United States and the Russian Federation formally establish diplomatic relations.
- April 7, 1992 – The United States recognizes Bosnia and Herzegovina, Croatia, and Slovenia.
- August 6, 1992 – The United States establishes diplomatic relations with Bosnia and Herzegovina, Croatia, and Slovenia.
- January 1, 1993 – The United States recognizes the Czech Republic and Slovakia.
- April 27, 1993 – The United States recognizes Eritrea.
- May 19, 1993 – The United States recognizes the new government of Angola.
- June 11, 1993 – The United States establishes diplomatic relations with Eritrea.
- July 30, 1993 – The United States closes its embassy in Honiara.
- February 9, 1994 – The United States recognizes the Republic of Macedonia.
- May 17, 1994 – The U.S. embassy in Phnom Penh, Cambodia re-opens.
- July 14, 1994 – The United States establishes diplomatic relations with Angola.
- October 1, 1994 – The United States recognizes the independence of Palau.
- February 21, 1995 – The United States establishes diplomatic relations with Andorra.
- July 11, 1995 – The United States and Vietnam re-establish diplomatic relations.
- September 13, 1995 – The United States establishes diplomatic relations with Macedonia.
- December 6, 1996 – The United States establishes diplomatic relations with Palau.
- February 10, 1997 – The United States establishes diplomatic relations with Liechtenstein.
- October 1997 – The U.S. consulate general in Ho Chi Minh City officially opens.
- March 23, 1999 – In response to the Kosovo War, the United States severs diplomatic relations with the Federal Republic of Yugoslavia.
- July 7, 1999 – The United States moves its embassy in Germany from Bonn to Berlin.

== 2000s ==
- November 12, 2000 – The United States resumes diplomatic relations with Yugoslavia.
- May 2001 – The U.S. embassy in Belgrade, Serbia re-opens.
- January 17, 2002 – The U.S. embassy in Kabul, Afghanistan re-opens.
- May 20, 2002 – The United States recognizes Timor-Leste and establishes diplomatic relations.
- June 28, 2004 – Following the transfer of sovereignty from the Coalition Provisional Authority to the new Iraqi Interim Government, the United States and Iraq re-established diplomatic relations. The U.S. embassy reopens in Baghdad's Green Zone.
- August 15, 2006 – The United States re-establishes diplomatic relations with Montenegro.
- December 2006 – The U.S. Mission to the African Union opens in Addis Ababa.
- December 8, 2006 – The United States establishes full diplomatic relations with Monaco.
- February 18, 2008 – The United States recognizes the independence of Kosovo and establishes diplomatic relations.

== 2010s ==
- 2010 – The U.S. Mission to ASEAN officially opens in Jakarta.
- July 9, 2011 – The United States formally recognizes and establishes diplomatic relations with South Sudan.
- February 6, 2012 – The U.S. embassy in Damascus, Syria suspends operations.
- July 26, 2014 – The U.S. embassy in Tripoli, Libya suspends operations.
- February 11, 2015 – The U.S. embassy in Sanaa, Yemen suspends operations.
- July 20, 2015 – The United States re-establishes diplomatic relations with Cuba.
- December 6, 2017 – The United States recognizes Jerusalem as the capital of Israel.
- December 2, 2018 – The U.S. embassy in Mogadishu, Somalia re-opens.
- March 11, 2019 – The U.S. embassy in Caracas, Venezuela suspends operations.

== 2020s ==
- June 2020 – The U.S. consulate in Nuuk, Greenland re-opens.
- August 31, 2021 – The U.S. embassy in Kabul, Afghanistan suspends operations.
- February 28, 2022 – The U.S. embassy in Minsk, Belarus suspends operations.
- February 2, 2023 – The U.S. embassy in Honiara re-opens.
- April 22, 2023 – The U.S. embassy in Khartoum, Sudan suspends operations.
- September 2023 – The U.S. embassy in Malé, Maldives opens.
- September 25, 2023 – The United States recognizes the Cook Islands and Niue.
- March 30, 2026 – The U.S. embassy in Caracas, Venezuela resumes operations.

== See also ==
- History of United States foreign policy
- List of countries by date of recognition of the United States
- Foreign relations of the United States
- List of diplomatic missions of the United States
- List of diplomatic missions in the United States
