= List of ambassadors of the Solomon Islands to Taiwan =

Coordinates: 25.117176°N 121.524075°E

Ambassador of the Solomon Islands to Taiwan
- Incumbent; None since November 30, 2016
- Inaugural holder: Lindsay Fakasaermaru Misros
- Formation: September 1983
- Abolished: September 21, 2019

The Solomon Islands ambassadors to Taiwan were the official representatives of Solomon Islands government in the period from 1983 to 2019 when Solomon Islands recognised Taiwan. On 15 September 2019, the parliament of Solomon Islands voted to change diplomatic recognition from the Republic of China (Taiwan) to the People's Republic of China. Consequently, Joseph Waleanisia was the last ambassador to Taiwan.
See list of ambassadors of Solomon Islands to China for ambassadors since 15 September 2019.

== List of representatives ==
Agreement approved/Diplomatic accreditation	ambassador	Chinese language	Observations	Prime Minister of Solomon Islands	Premier of the Republic of China	Term end
March 24, 1983			The governments in Taipei and Honiara established diplomatic relations.	Solomon Mamaloni	Sun Yun-suan	
September 1989	Lindsay Fakasaermaru Misros	米羅斯		Solomon Mamaloni	Lee Huan	
May 2000			Embassy established	Manasseh Sogavare	Tang Fei	
May 2000	Seth Gukuna	辜庫納	2003, September The Ambassador of Solomon Islands to Taiwan (Gukuna) is replaced after his criticism of a Taiwanese politician.	Manasseh Sogavare	Tang Fei	September 2003
October 2003	Beraki Jino	博羅奇．基諾		Allan Kemakeza	Yu Shyi-kun	February 2010
March 23, 2010	Victor Samuel Ngele	恩雷	Victor Samuel Ngele presents credentials to President Malaysia, 2010/3/23, Jul 16, 2013 - Solomon Islands High Commissioner accredited to Malaysia, Victor Ngele has finally presented his letter of Credence to the King of Malaysia	Derek Sikua	Wu Den-yih	March 2012
May 2012	Laurie Chan	陳學仕		Gordon Darcy Lilo	Sean Chen	September 2014
October 2014	Gladys Luahiti	羅希蒂	Chargé d'Affaires	Gordon Darcy Lilo	Jiang Yi-huah; Lin Chuan	November 30, 2016
November 30, 2016	Joseph Pius Waleanisia	王哲夫	Solomon Islands parliament votes to transfer recognition from Taiwan to the People's Republic of China	Manasseh Sogavare	Lin Chuan; Lai Ching-te	September 15, 2019
September 17, 2019	Recalled		Taiwan embassy in Honiara closes at 11:00hrs.	Manasseh Sogavare	Lai Ching-te	September 17, 2019
September 21, 2019	None possible		Joint communiqué establishes diplomatic relations with PRC	Manasseh Sogavare	Lai Ching-te	September 21, 2019

== See also ==
- List of ambassadors of Solomon Islands to China
- List of diplomatic missions in Solomon Islands
- List of diplomatic missions of Solomon Islands
- Minister of Foreign Affairs (Solomon Islands)
