= Battle of the Bloody Ridge =

Battle of the Bloody Ridge may refer to:

- Battle of Bloody Ridge, a battle that took place August 18 – September 5, 1951 during the Korean War
- Battle of Edson's Ridge, a battle that took place September 12 – 14, 1942 during the Guadalcanal Campaign in the Pacific War of World War II

== See also ==
- Battle of Bloody Ridge (Leyte), a World War II battle on the Leyte Island during Battle of Leyte
- Battle of Bloody Ridge (Ie Shima), a World War II battle on the Ie Shima Island, Okinawa prefecture
- Bloody Ridge (disambiguation)
