= Solomon Islands–United States relations =

- Solomon Islands: United States

Solomon Islands–United States relations are bilateral relations between Solomon Islands and the United States. Initial relations were forged during World War II with what was then the British Solomon Islands Protectorate during the Japanese occupation, and this relationship remained strong as Solomon Islands gained its independence in 1978. Relations continued until 1993 when post-Cold War budget cuts closed the United States Embassy in Honiara. Beginning in 2022, in an attempt to counter growing Chinese influence in Solomon Islands, the United States has demonstrated increased commitment to the restoration of relations with the country. In February 2023, the United States re-opened its embassy in Honiara.

== History ==
Solomon Islands–United States relations

- Solomon Islands: United States

During World War II, prior to Solomon Islands' independence from its British protectorate status, native Solomon Islanders allied with the United States and Australian militaries to expel Japanese forces from the Solomon Islands archipelago, which then included Bougainville Island. Occupied by the Japanese Army and Navy in April 1942, Marines of the United States' 1st Marine Division landed on the southern Solomon island of Guadalcanal and joined native islanders to dislodge the Japanese from the island chain by early 1943. Today, several memorials stand at the Vilu War Museum on Guadalcanal to commemorate the victory and is occasionally visited by American and Japanese tourists. Closely tied following World War II, the United States Congress financed the construction of the Solomon Islands Parliament building.

The United States and Solomon Islands established diplomatic relations following the latter's independence on July 7, 1978. U.S. Senator John Glenn represented the United States at the independence ceremony held in the newly independent nation's capital, Honiara, along with a Japanese delegation. The U.S. maintained an embassy in Honiara until, following President Bill Clinton's inauguration in 1993, the embassy was shuttered along with twenty-two others as part of the administration's post-Cold War deficit-reduction plan targeting the Department of State, Agency for International Development (USAID), and U.S. Information Agency (USIA). In the region, Indonesia, the Philippines, and Thailand also experienced closures of U.S. diplomatic posts.

== Diplomatic relations ==
From the closure of the U.S. embassy in Honiara in 1993 until 2023, the United States did not have an embassy in the Solomon Islands. The U.S. embassy reopened on the Solomon Islands on 2 February 2023.

While not maintaining a diplomatic presence in the nation, U.S. representation is handled by the United States Embassy at Port Moresby where the ambassador is resident and manages relations with Papua New Guinea, Vanuatu, and Solomon Islands. As of 2017, approximately 95 American citizens resided permanently in Solomon Islands.

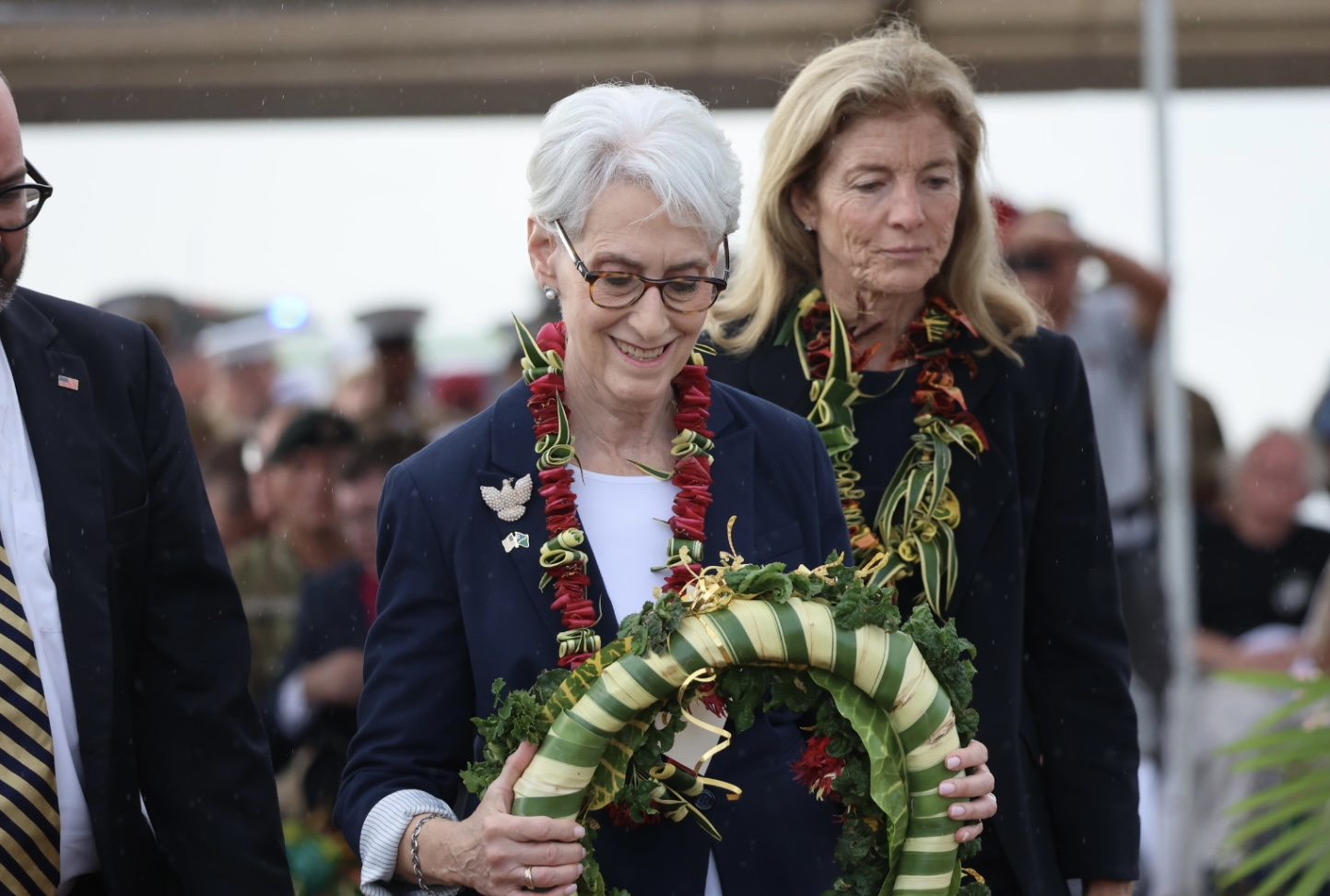
Deputy Secretary Sherman and Ambassador Kennedy at the Bloody Ridge Memorial

In 2019, then-Vice President Mike Pence cancelled a meeting with Prime Minister Manasseh Sogavare following his decision to switch the nation's recognition and diplomatic relations from Taiwan to the People's Republic of China, stirring massive domestic unrest. At a budget hearing of the House Committee on Foreign Affairs, the USAID's Bureau for Asia stated the organization was reassessing assistance to Solomon Islands following the sudden shift.

During a tour of Fiji in February 2022, United States Secretary of State Antony Blinken announced the decision to reopen the U.S. embassy in Honiara after the closure in 1993. On 23 December 2022, the State Department notified Congress of its plans to re-open the U.S Embassy in Solomon Islands after thirty years in response to fears of debt-trap diplomacy by the People's Republic of China. The notice issued by the State Department read "The United States needs a permanent diplomatic presence in Honiara to effectively provide a counterweight to growing [Chinese] influence and deepen our engagement with the region commensurate with its importance." The same notice acknowledged the difficulties following 30 years of disengagement with the island nation, stating "Before [China] becomes strongly embedded in Solomon Islands, now is the opportunity to bolster Solomon Islands' resilience and deepen cooperation on security, democratic governance, and a free and open economy... The absence of an embassy has severely constrained our ability to engage with this strategically situationed country with alacrity and precision."

In July 2022, the United States dispatched Deputy Secretary of State Wendy Sherman and U.S. Ambassador to Australia Caroline Kennedy, both of whose fathers had fought in the Solomon Islands campaign of World War II, to attend an 80th anniversary ceremony for the Battle of Guadalcanal and to underscore the historically strong ties between the two nations.

In August 2022, Solomon Islands stopped a U.S. Coast Guard vessel from visiting, which came as Solomon Islands was rapidly expanding its ties with China under prime minister Mannaseh Sogavare. In September 2022, Solomon Islands did not endorse a joint declaration that the Biden administration planned to unveil at the U.S.-Pacific Island Country Summit. In August 2026, the Solomon Islands and the U.S. entered into a security agreement.

== Assistance ==
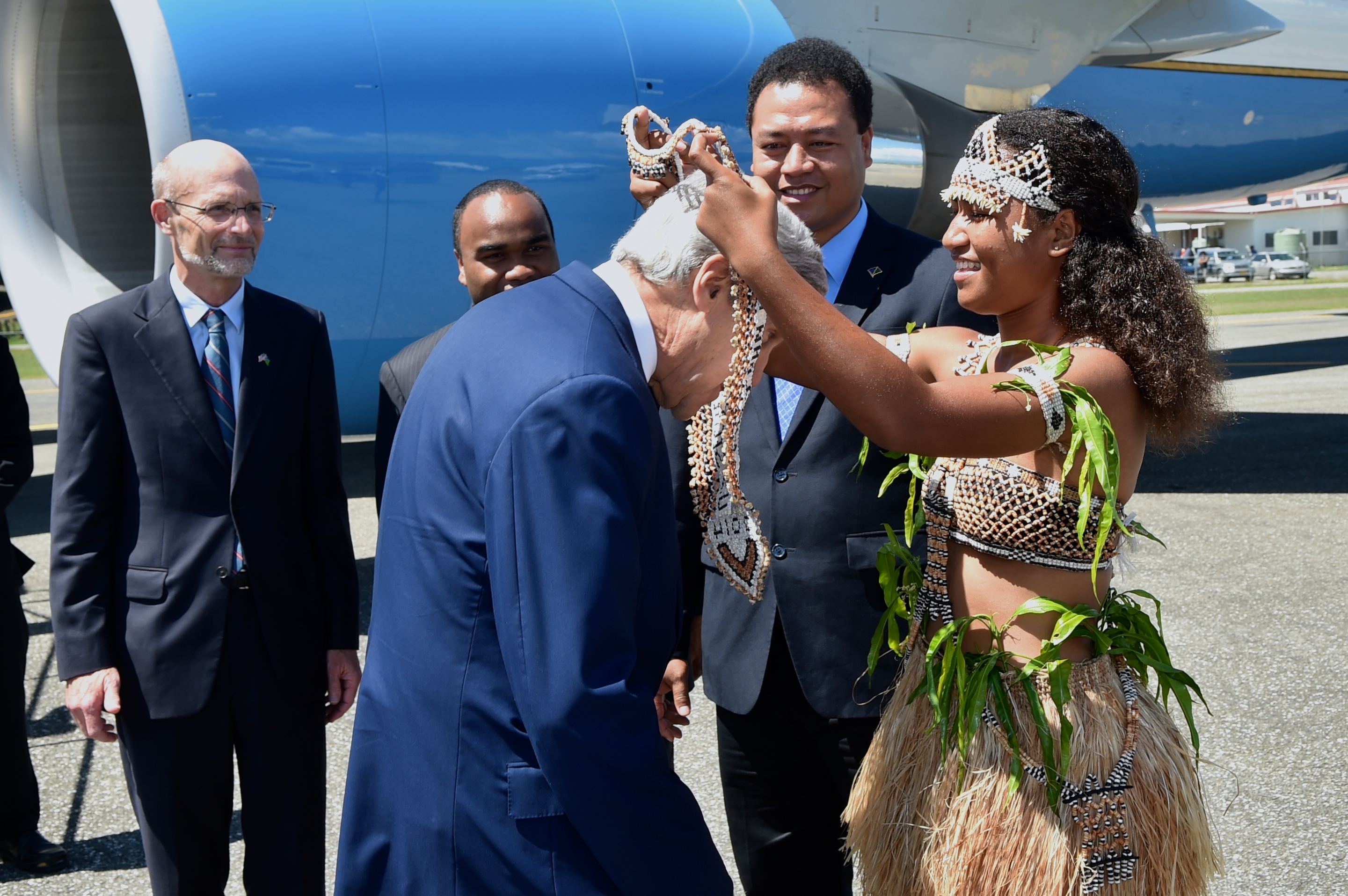
Former U.S. Secretary of State John Kerry receives traditional necklace upon arriving in Solomon Islands

The two nations belong to a variety of regional organizations, including the Pacific Community and the Pacific Regional Environmental Program. The United States and Solomon Islands also cooperate under the U.S.-Pacific Islands multilateral Tuna Fisheries Treaty, under which the U.S. grants $18 million per year to Pacific island parties and the latter provide access to U.S. fishing vessels.

The U.S. Coast Guard provides training to Solomon Islands border protection officers, and the U.S. military also provides appropriate military education and training courses to national security officials.

The U.S. Peace Corps suspended its twenty-nine year program in June 2000 due to the ethnic violence and breakdown in governance. More than 70 volunteers, serving throughout the country in rural community development, education, environmental management, and youth programs, were evacuated.

U.S. trade with Solomon Islands is very limited. In 2001, U.S. exports to Solomon Islands were less than 5% of all exports, while Solomon Islands exports to the United States in that year were negligible.

Following the 2007 Solomon Islands earthquake and tsunami, the United States provided $250,000 in humanitarian assistance grants and deployed the USNS Stockham with helicopter support to the affected area.

== See also ==
- Foreign relations of Solomon Islands
- Foreign relations of the United States
