= China–Solomon Islands relations =

Bilateral relations between China and Solomon Islands

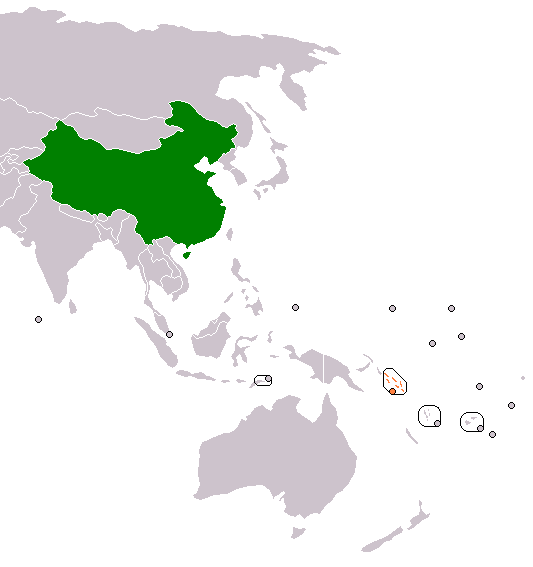

- China: Solomon Islands

Envoy
- His Excellency Ambassador Cai Weiming: Ambassador Barrett Salato

Solomon Islands and the People's Republic of China established official diplomatic relations in 2019. Prior to this, Solomon Islands had diplomatic relations with Taiwan.

Since December 2023, the ambassador of China to Solomon Islands is Cai Weiming. As of 28 December 2023, the ambassador of Solomon Islands to China is Barrett Salato.

== History ==
Solomon Islands, formerly the British Solomon Islands Protectorate, gained its independence in 1978 and became known as Solomon Islands.

Five years later, in 1983, Solomon Islands established diplomatic relations with the Republic of China (ROC) which it maintained until 2019 when Prime Minister Manasseh Sogavare severed the 36-year relationship with the Taiwanese government and began official recognition and diplomatic relations with the People's Republic of China (PRC). The Guardian and national newspaper the Solomon Star reported that Solomon Islands MPs had claimed both the PRC and ROC had offered hundreds of thousands of dollars in bribes to them, to influence the politics in their favour. A series of demonstrations and violent riots followed the government's decision leading to a 36-hour lockdown in the capital, a number of buildings were burnt down, and the deployment of police. Deakin University Professor Matthew Clarke deemed the switch an important step for China's Belt and Road Initiative goals.

In 2006, riots in Solomon Islands resulted in the destruction of more than 60 Chinese-owned shops and prompted the Chinese government to evacuate 310 Chinese citizens.

Solomon Islands joined the Belt and Road Initiative (BRI) in 2019.

In 2019, China and the Solomon Islands signed a memorandum of understanding which incorporated blue economy cooperation.

Effective 1 December 2024, China eliminated tariffs for goods imported from all of the countries that the United Nations categorizes as least developed and with which China has diplomatic relations, including Solomon Islands.

In May 2026, Matthew Wale, a critic of Solomon Islands' relationship with China, was elected prime minister of Solomon Islands. Wale cited a purported lack of transparency with the Solomon Islands' security agreement with the PRC and promised to review it.

== Contemporary relations ==
=== Lease of Tulagi ===
In September 2019, Chinese state-owned conglomerate China Sam Enterprise Group secretly signed a lease agreement with the Tulagi provincial government for exclusive rights to the entire island. Leaked details of the agreement revealed provisions for a fishery base, operations centre, an airport, and an oil and gas terminal. A month later, the Solomon Islands attorney general overturned the agreement, citing trespass on national government powers, the failure of China Sam to register as a foreign investor, and the lack of vital details including a timeline.

=== Security pact ===
In March 2022, China and Solomon Islands signed a draft security pact that, according to leaked photos, allows Honiara to ask Beijing to send in law enforcement and military personnel to Solomon Islands to assist in "maintaining social order" or "protecting people's lives and property". The deal also permits Chinese ships to conduct replenish and stopover in Solomon Islands and to use the "relevant forces of China" to "protect the safety of Chinese personnel and other major projects in Solomon Islands" and to allow for aerial surveillance of the Pacific islands and Australia.

The Solomon Islands government announced the agreement was part of an effort to "respond to Solomon Islands' soft and hard domestic threats" as part of the nation's national security strategy, referring to the violent 2021 Solomon Islands unrest over the Prime Minister's decision to switch recognition from the ROC to the PRC. The Australian government, being both a neighbour of Solomon Islands and a strategic rival to China, voiced great concern over this development. Particularly, Australia and some of its allies including New Zealand were concerned that this might be the start of permanent Chinese military bases being placed near Australia. Australian Prime Minister Scott Morrison said the pact was "a reminder of the constant pressure and threats that present in our region to our own national security". Similar, New Zealand Prime Minister Jacinda Ardern expressed concern that the security pact would lead to the militarisation of the South Pacific. In February 2024, Al Jazeera reported that the New Zealand Government had lobbied French Polynesian and New Caledonian officials into taking a position on the Chinese—Solomon Islands security pact.

In 2025, Chinese police under the Ministry of Public Security operating in Solomon Islands began to implement a local pilot program based upon the Fengqiao experience. The pilot was suspended following local backlash about mass surveillance.

=== Visit by Wang Yi ===
In May 2022, China's Foreign Minister Wang Yi visited Solomon Islands as his first stop of a ten-nation tour in the Pacific. With only select media allowed to cover the event, the Media Association of Solomon Islands boycotted in protest. Wang's visit, part of an effort to sign a sweeping security and economic agreement with each of the small Pacific nations, was described by Solomon Islands Secretary of Foreign Affairs Jermiah Manele as a "milestone in the relations" between Solomon Islands and PRC.

=== Deal with Huawei ===
In August 2022, the government of Solomon Islands accepted a $66 million (USD) loan from the People's Republic of China to have Chinese telecommunications giant Huawei construct 161 mobile phone towers in Solomon Islands, celebrated as "a historic financial partnership". Previously, in 2018, Solomon Islands awarded Huawei a contract to build a telecommunications cable network prompting the Australian government to intervene. The government of Solomon Islands claimed it hoped to repay the loan within 11 years, however this loan and the Chinese issued Tina Hydro Project loan raised the Solomon Islands national debt from 15% of GDP to 30%. A 2019 Central Bank of Solomon Islands report prior to the loan warned that the country didn't have the capacity to take further loans from the PRC. In October, Opposition leader Matthew Wale urged the government to scrap the loans and claimed that they were paying for technology that will be obsolete far before the government pays off the loan. Wales also asked the government to publish a report by consulting firm KPMG which highlights Huawei's entitlement to 50% of revenue over ten years.

=== Other activity ===
In August 2022, Solomon Islands turned away a U.S. Coast Guard ship and British Royal Navy ship claiming to have placed a moratorium on all foreign military ships pending further review, raising fears that Solomon Islands was turning away from western nations in favour of China.

China offered money for Daniel Suidani's life treatment if he stopped opposing Chinese operations in Malatia. Suidani refused and eventually was treated by Taiwan. Hon. Matthew Wale, leader of the opposition was dismayed by this.

=== 2024 elections in Solomon Islands and implications ===
Cleo Paskal of The National Interest reflected that the elections in Solomon Islands will have major strategic implications in the struggle between the United States and China over influence in the Pacific. According to The National Interest, Solomon Islanders voted for change yet due to Solomon Islands' political structure, politicians sympathetic to China assumed power.

== See also ==
- Foreign relations of China
- Foreign relations of Solomon Islands
- Solomon Islands–Taiwan relations
- Sino-Pacific relations
