= New Zealand–Solomon Islands relations =

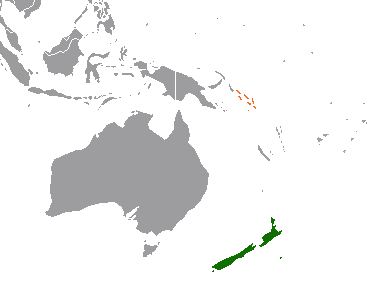

- New Zealand: Solomon Islands

Diplomatic mission
- New Zealand High Commission to the Solomon Islands: Solomon Islands High Commission to New Zealand

New Zealand–Solomon Islands relations are the bilateral relations between New Zealand and the Solomon Islands. Both countries are members of the Commonwealth of Nations and Pacific Islands Forum.

== Diplomatic representation ==
New Zealand is represented in Solomon Islands by its High Commission in Honiara. Solomon Islands is represented in New Zealand by its High Commission in Wellington.

== History ==
New Zealand and the Solomon Islands established diplomatic relations on 7 July 1978 after the Solomons gained independence.

In response to civil conflict within the Solomon Islands, New Zealand contributed defence and civilian personnel to the Australian-led International Peace Monitoring Team (IPMT) following the Townsville Peace Agreement in October 2000. Between 2003 and 2017, New Zealand contributed both military and law enforcement personnel to the Regional Assistance Mission to the Solomon Islands (RAMSI).

In March 2015, the New Zealand journalists Nicky Hager and Ryan Gallagher reported that New Zealand's signals intelligence agency, the Government Communications Security Bureau (GCSB), was using the internet mass surveillance system XKeyscore to intercept email communications from several senior Solomon Islands government ministers, the Solomons Islands Truth and Reconciliation Commission, and anti-corruption campaigner Benjamin Afuga. In response, the New Zealand Foreign Minister Murray McCully sought to reassure the Solomon Islands Government's concerns about New Zealand's mass surveillance program. The Solomons Chief of Staff, Robert Iroga, objected to the GCSB's tapping of his government's internal communications, which in his view damaged New Zealand's image as a "friendly government" in the South Pacific.

In March 2022, Prime Minister Jacinda Ardern supported Australia's concerns about a security pact between China and Solomon Islands; claiming that it would lead to the militarisation of the South Pacific. In addition, the New Zealand Government unsuccessfully lobbied French Polynesian and New Caledonian officials into taking a position on the Chinese—Solomon Islands security pact.

On 12 May 2024, New Zealand Foreign Minister Winston Peters visited Solomons Prime Minister Jeremiah Manele, who had succeeded Manasseh Sogavare following the 2024 Solomon Islands general election. This was part of Peters' tour of several Pacific states including Papua New Guinea, Vanuatu, New Caledonia and Tuvalu in mid-May 2024.

== Development and aid relations ==
New Zealand has a development cooperation programme with the Solomon Islands focusing on building state capacity, social and economic resilience, sustainable resource management, climate resilience, fishing, humanitarian and disaster relief. In 2016, the New Zealand and Solomons foreign ministers Murray McCully and Milner Tozaka signed a revised Joint Commitment for Development focusing on transport infrastructure, fisheries, education, tourism, aviation, revenue administration and justice.

== Economic and trade relations ==
Bilateral economic relations are modest. Both New Zealand and the Solomon Islands have ratified the PACER Plus agreement. Solomon Islanders are also eligible to participate in New Zealand's seasonal horticulture worker programme, the Recognised Seasonal Employer scheme.

== Education relations ==
Solomon Islanders are also eligible for New Zealand's Manaaki New Zealand Scholarships programme, which provides both tertiary and short-term training scholarships. Several Solomon Islanders politicians and civil servants have also studied at New Zealand schools and tertiary institutions.

== See also ==
- Foreign relations of New Zealand
- Foreign relations of Solomon Islands
