= Solomon Islands–Turkey relations =

- Solomon Islands: Turkey

Solomon Islands–Turkey relations are the foreign relations between the Solomon Islands and Turkey. Diplomatic relations between the two countries were established on 8 March 1979.

== History ==
In 2008, Turkey hosted a meeting of Pacific Islands Foreign Affairs Ministers in Istanbul which brought together Turkey and Pacific Islands Officials for the first time in an international setting.

In 2013, Reha Keskintepe, the newly appointed Turkish ambassador to Solomon Islands, announced Turkey's determination to enhance ties with Solomon Islands while steps were being taken for the two countries to sign a Memorandum of Understanding (MoU).

In 2014, Turkey provided direct assistance to Solomon Islands during the floods in April. Turkey has also assisted one of the Provincial Hospitals with transportation.

== Diplomatic representation ==
The Turkish ambassador in the Australian capital city of Canberra is also accredited to the Solomon Islands.

== See also ==
- Foreign relations of Solomon Islands
- Foreign relations of Turkey
