= Fiji–Solomon Islands relations =

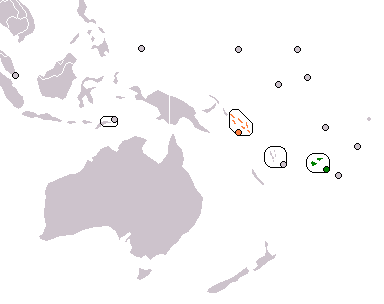

- Fiji: Solomon Islands

Fiji–Solomon Islands relations are the bilateral relations between Fiji and Solomon Islands. Diplomatic relations are cordial, although the Solomon Islands government has aligned itself with other countries in the region to urge Fiji interim Prime Minister Voreqe Bainimarama to restore democracy in Fiji. Fiji and the Solomons are both located in Melanesia, and are both members of the Melanesian Spearhead Group. They also participate in other regional organisations including the Pacific Islands Forum. In August 2008, it was announced that Solomon Islands intended to open a High Commission in Suva, and in December the government of Fiji announced that it had "formally endorsed the establishment of a Resident Diplomatic Mission in Suva by the Government of Solomon Islands". Fiji's High Commission to Papua New Guinea is accredited to Solomon Islands.

The earliest relations between the two countries came during the Second World War, when Fiji soldiers under British command fought against the Japanese in the Solomons. Formal diplomatic relations were established on 28 July 1978, when the Solomon Islands became a sovereign country.

Today, Fiji soldiers are once again present in the Solomon Islands, as part of the Regional Assistance Mission to Solomon Islands (RAMSI).

There is a Fiji community in Solomon Islands, notably in Honiara, the capital city. It includes both Solomon Islands citizens of Fiji descent and Fiji citizen workers and businessmen currently residing in the Solomons. Similarly, there are Fiji citizens of Solomon Islands descent in Fiji, descendants of workers who came to work on European-owned plantations in the nineteenth century. Suva "has one of the highest concentrations of Solomon Islanders living overseas".

Former Solomon Islands Prime Minister, Derek Sikua, was educated in Fiji and speaks Fijian.

Since March 2012, the Solomon Islands High Commissioner to Fiji is former Foreign Affairs Minister Patteson Oti.

== See also ==
- Foreign relations of Fiji
- Foreign relations of Solomon Islands
