= Malaysia–Solomon Islands relations =

- Malaysia: Solomon Islands

Malaysia–Solomon Islands relations refers to the bilateral relations between Malaysia and Solomon Islands. Malaysia has an honorary consulate in Honiara while the Malaysia high commission in Port Moresby is also accredited to the country, and Solomon Islands had a high commission in Kuala Lumpur from 2013 until a closure was announced in 2019.

== History ==
The relations between the two countries had been established since 1986–1988. Both countries were once part of the British Empire and the relationship is based on mutual interests and respect for ideals and principles of peace, freedom, democracy, respect for fundamental human values and sovereignty. The relations also based on the "Look North Policy" by the Solomon governments to strengthen ties and deepen co-operation for mutual benefits with other countries in the Asian region.

== Economic relations ==
In 2009, the total export of Solomon Islands products to Malaysia worth around SB$30 million and Solomon Islands were the largest importer of Malaysian products in the Pacific region. Solomon Islands also endeavour to learn and share experiences in targeted areas with Malaysia, notably in the development of small and medium enterprises (SMEs). Currently, some Malaysian oil palm companies are expanding operations in the Solomon Islands.

== See also ==
- Foreign relations of Malaysia
- Foreign relations of Solomon Islands
