= List of ambassadors of the Solomon Islands to China =

Ambassador of the Solomon Islands to China
- Incumbent; Barrett Salato since December 28, 2023
- Inaugural holder: John Moffat Fugui
- Formation: 21 September 2019; 6 years ago

The Ambassador of the Solomon Islands to China is the official representatives of the Solomon Islands to China (PRC) since 2019.

On 15 September 2019, the Solomon Islands parliament voted to change the country's diplomatic recognition from Taiwan to China; diplomatic recognition of either Taiwan or China is mutually exclusive. On 21 September 2019, Solomon Islands and the People's Republic of China issued a joint communiqué, establishing relations.

== List of representatives ==
Agreement approved/Diplomatic accreditation	Ambassador	Chinese language	Observations	Prime Minister of Solomon Islands	Premier of PRC	Term end
September 21, 2019			The governments of China and Solomon Islands establish formal diplomatic relations.	Manasseh Sogavare	Li Keqiang	
May 22, 2021	John Moffat Fugui	约翰·傅桂		Manasseh Sogavare	Li Keqiang	22 December 2022
December 28, 2023	Barrett Salato	巴雷特·萨拉托		Manasseh Sogavare	Li Qiang	

39°55′N 116°23′E

== See also ==
- List of ambassadors of Solomon Islands to Taiwan
- List of diplomatic missions in Solomon Islands
- List of diplomatic missions of Solomon Islands
- Minister of Foreign Affairs (Solomon Islands)
