= Bloody Ridge =

Bloody Ridge may refer to:

== Battles ==
- Battle of Bloody Ridge, a 1951 Korean War battle
- Battle of Edson's Ridge, also known as the Battle of the Bloody Ridge, a World War II battle of Guadalcanal campaign in the Solomon Islands
- Battle of Bloody Ridge (Leyte), a World War II battle on the Leyte Island during Battle of Leyte
- Battle of Bloody Ridge (Ie Shima), a World War II battle on the Ie Shima Island, Okinawa prefecture

== Other uses ==
- Bloody Ridge National Historical Park, a former battlefield near Honiara, Solomon Islands
- Bloody Ridge (game), a board wargame published in 1975

== See also ==
- Drumcrow (Irish: Droim Cró or Bloody Ridge), a townland in Kilcronaghan, County Londonderry, Northern Ireland
