= List of countries by date of recognition of the United States =

This is a list of nations by when they recognized the United States.

State	Date	Notes
Morocco	December 20, 1777	Morocco implicitly recognized the United States in 1777, after Sultan Mohammed III signed a decree granting American ships protection and free access to Moroccan ports. The Sultan previously expressed his desire to be a "friend of the Americans". Morocco formally recognized the United States on June 23, 1786, when a treaty of peace and friendship was signed.
France	February 6, 1778	Treaty of peace and trade signed by the Charles Gravier, Comte de Vergennes on the behalf of King Louis XVI. Louis XVI previously stated that he recognized the sovereignty of the United States on December 6, 1777, but he had not signed the treaty.
The Netherlands	April 19, 1782	The first official acknowledgement of the sovereignty of the United States of America was on November 16, 1776, when the first foreign salute was given to the American Flag. The gun salute was given to the vessel USS Andrew Doria in Fort Orange on the Dutch island of St. Eustatius. This event is known as 'The First Salute'
Denmark–Norway	1783	Diplomatic relations date back to 1783, when Denmark signed a commercial treaty with the United States and thereby implicitly recognizing the United States. In 1792, Denmark–Norway recognized the independence of the United States officially. In 1801, diplomatic relations were established, and an American legation was opened in Denmark.
Spain	January 20, 1783	On September 4, 1776, Luis de Unzaga y Amézaga recognised the United States as a nation in his correspondence with General Charles Lee, addressing him with the title "General of the United States of America". This term was transmitted to Joseph Reed and George Washington. On the Treaty of Aranjuez (1779) Spain de facto recognized the U.S. by entering the war. In 1783 (Peace of Paris) Spain accepted U.S. independence as part of the peace settlement.
Portugal	February 15, 1783	Diplomatic relations only began in 1791 following the Revolutionary War.
Sweden	April 3, 1783	Officially in 1783 with "The Swedish-American Treaty of Amity and Commerce". Unofficially the Swedish king Gustav III was the first head of state to recognise USA in 1777 and expressed his excitement about "this new republic" in October 1786.
Ragusa	July 7, 1783	de facto recognition
Venice	August 1783	
Great Britain	September 3, 1783	Signing of the Treaty of Paris of 1783, ending the American Revolutionary War and recognizing U.S. independence.
Papal States	December 15, 1784	
Prussia	September 18, 1785	
Mysore	June 11, 1788	Thomas Jefferson's letter to Robert Montgomer recognizes relations the embassy of Tipu Sultan.
Hamburg	June 17, 1790	
Genoa	October 25, 1791	
Denmark–Norway	June 9, 1792	
Bremen	May 28, 1794	
Tuscany	May 29, 1794	Exact date of recognition unknown, but occurred between May 29, 1794, and December 7, 1796.
Tunisia	March 28, 1795	Some time in mid-1795.
Algeria	September 5, 1795	
Naples	May 20, 1796	
Tripolitania	November 4, 1796	
Austria	1797	Month and day unspecified
Piedmont-Sardinia	1802	Month and day unspecified
Russian Empire	October 28, 1803	
Mecklenburg-Schwerin	January 22, 1816	
Gran Colombia	June 19, 1822	As ambassador extraordinary and plenipotentiary on behalf of Gran Colombia Credentials are presented by Manuel Torres who established diplomatic relations with the United States and in turn is received as the first ambassador of Colombia by U.S. President James Monroe on June 19, 1822. This act represented the first U.S. recognition of a former Spanish colony's independence.
Mexico	December 12, 1822	
Württemberg	November 21, 1825	
Hawaii	December 23, 1826	
Hesse	May 14, 1829	
Switzerland	November 30, 1829	
Oldenburg	December 2, 1829	
Hanover	January 8, 1830	
Ottoman Empire	February 11, 1830	
Baden	July 13, 1832	
Thailand	20 March 1833	
Bavaria	July 4, 1833	
Oman	September 21, 1833	
Republic of Texas	March 3, 1837	
China	June 16, 1844	
Nassau	May 27, 1846	
Brunswick	April 5, 1848	
Parma	June 1850	
Iran	June 28, 1850	
Schaumburg-Lippe	June 16, 1852	
Mecklenburg-Strelitz	December 2, 1853	
Japan	March 31, 1854	Perry Expedition
Ryukyu	July 11, 1854	
Italy	April 11, 1861	
Orange Free State	December 22, 1871	
Serbia	October 14, 1881	
Korea	May 22, 1882	
Abyssinia (Ethiopia)	December 27, 1903	
Montenegro	October 30, 1905	
Yugoslavia	February 10, 1919	
Poland	May 2, 1919	
Afghanistan	July 26, 1921	
Albania	July 28, 1922	
Egypt	April 26, 1922	
Canada	February 18, 1927	
South Africa	November 5, 1929	
Iraq	January 9, 1930	
Soviet Union	November 16, 1933	
Philippines	July 4, 1946	
Pakistan	August 15, 1947	
South Korea	January 1, 1949	
Taiwan	December 19, 1949	
South Vietnam	February 7, 1950	
The Bahamas	July 10, 1973	
Bosnia and Herzegovina	April 7, 1992	
Slovenia	April 7, 1992	
North Macedonia	February 9, 1994	
Vietnam	January 28, 1995	
Serbia and Montenegro	November 12, 2000	
East Timor	May 20, 2002	
Kosovo	February 18, 2008	
South Sudan	July 9, 2011	
Cook Islands	September 25, 2023	
Niue	September 25, 2023	

== See also ==
- Diplomatic relations of the United States
- Timeline of United States diplomatic relations
