= Solomon Islands National University =

University of Solomon islands

- Type: Public
- Established: 2013; 12 years ago
- Vice-Chancellor: Transform Aqorau
- Location: Honiara, Solomon Islands (main campus); 9.435°S 159.9512°E
- Website: www.sinu.edu.sb
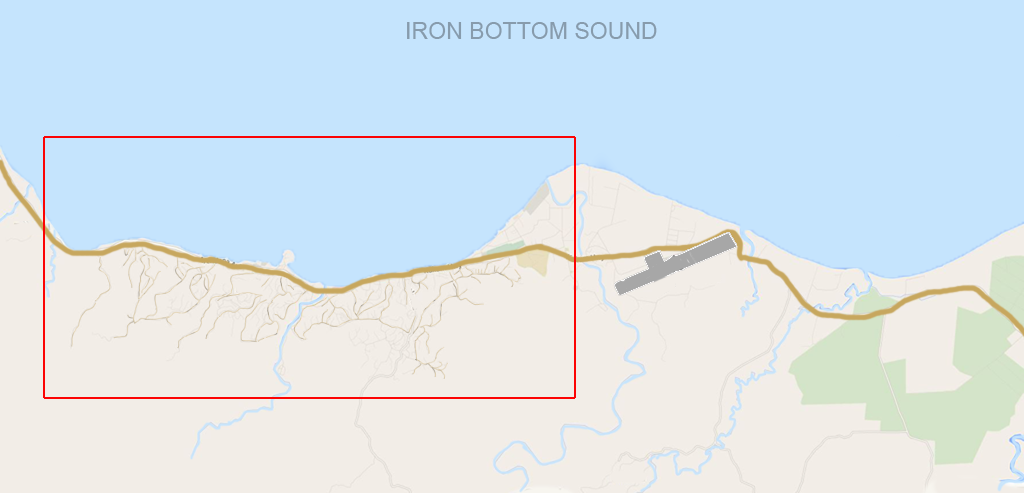
- Location in Honiara Solomon Islands National University (Solomon Islands)

The Solomon Islands National University (SINU) was established in 2013 by the Government of the Solomon Islands.

== Faculties ==
SINU has five faculties and a centre for distance and flexible learning. The faculties are listed below:

- Faculty of Business & Tourism Studies
- Faculty of Science & Technology
- Faculty of Nursing, Medicine & Health Science
- Faculty of Agriculture, Fisheries & Forestry
- Faculty of Education & Humanities

== Leadership ==
Dr Transform Aqorau is the Vice Chancellor of SINU.
