= Bloody Ridge National Historical Park =

Bloody Ridge
- Park
- Location in Guadalcanal
- Coordinates: 9°26′S 159°57′E
- Country: Solomon Islands
- Province: Honiara Town
- Island: Guadalcanal
- Elevation: 29 m (95 ft)
- Time zone: UTC+11 (UTC)

Bloody Ridge National Historical Park is the first national park of the Solomon Islands, designated by the Parks Act 1954 to commemorate and protect the location of the Battle of Edson's Ridge in World War II. It was established in August 2017. Originally named Bloody Ridge National Peace Park, it was renamed in 2025.

A total of 3524 people visited the park in 2025: 1873 foreign tourists (including 812 from the United States, 344 from Australia, 158 from Japan and 143 from New Zealand), 602 local tourists, 876 students and researchers, and 159 officials and workers.

For students, the park is becoming an unofficial outdoor classroom of Solomon Islands National University, providing hands-on experience in forestry and environmental management.

In 2025, the park employed 369 locals part-time.

The park is intended to be larger, to include historical areas such as part of the World War II Henderson Field battlefield (the Battle of Edson's Ridge helped determine which side would control Henderson Field), but disputes with landowners, squatters, and legal uncertainties are impeding the expansion. Removal of unexploded ordnance and site preparation was conducted on 2,500 square metres (27,000 sq ft) of land in 2025.

In June 2025, the government announced that there were no longer illegal settlers inside the park. Illegal roads joining surrounding communities present a problem, causing environmental damage and littering. On 24 June 2026, an arson fire destroyed nearly 90% of a reforestation project.
