= Solomon Star =

Newspaper in Solomon Islands

- Type: Daily newspaper
- Owner: News Corp
- Founded: 25 May 1982; 44 years ago
- Website: www.solomonstarnews.com

The Solomon Star is a Solomon Islands daily, English language newspaper, launched on 25 May 1982. It is produced by the Solomon Star Company, whose owner, publisher and director was Father John Lamani, who served until his death in 2012. Lamani was also one of the paper's co-founders. The newspaper's editor, as of 2004, is Ofani Eremae. In 2023, the Organized Crime and Corruption Reporting Project reported that the Solomon Star received almost $US140,000 from the Chinese government in return for pledges to "promote the truth about China's generosity and its true intentions."
