= Solomon Islands–Taiwan relations =

- Solomon Islands: Taiwan

Solomon Islands no longer has official diplomatic ties with Taiwan (ROC) due to the One-China policy since 2019.

== History ==
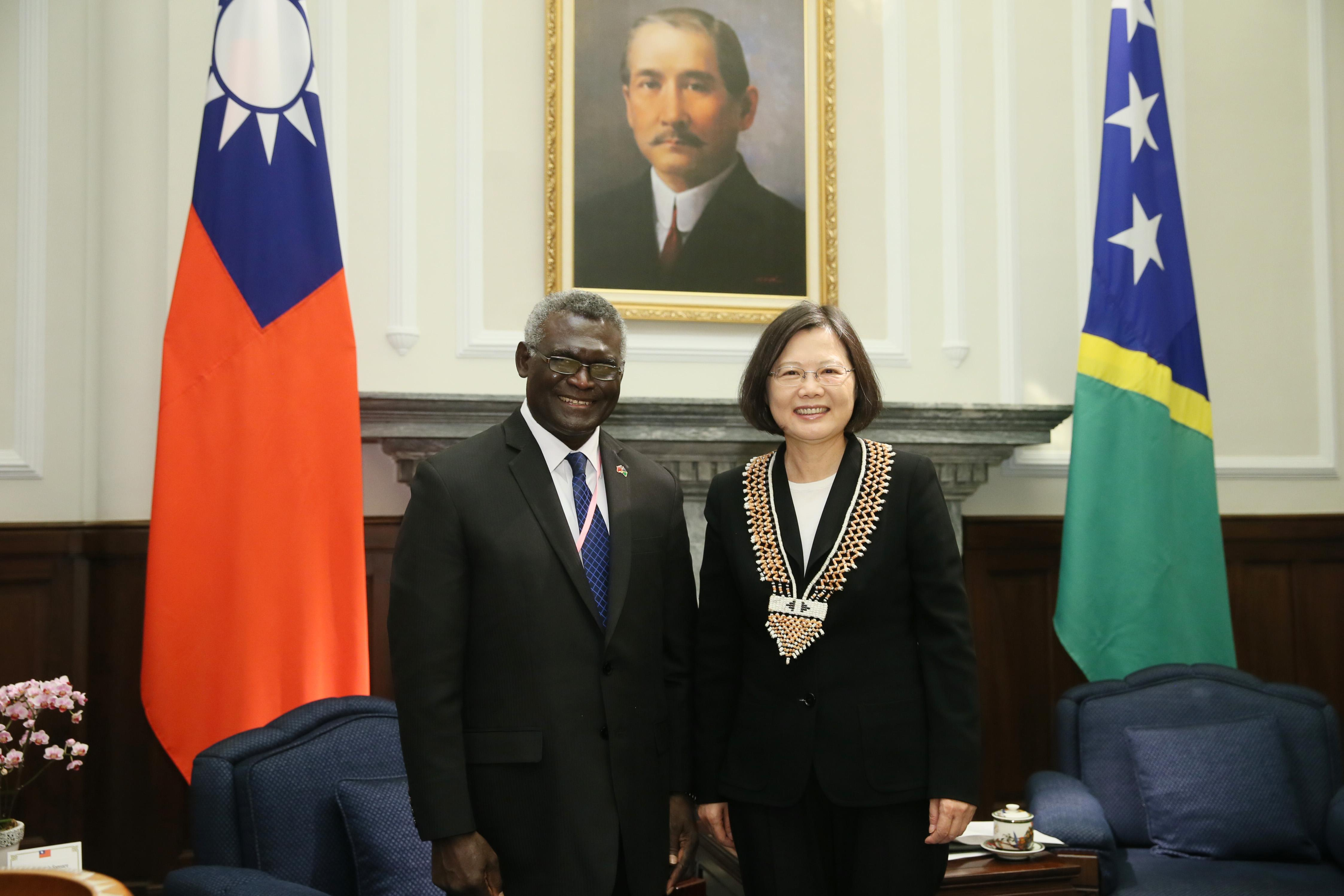
Solomon Islands Prime Minister Manasseh Sogavare meets with Taiwanese President Tsai Ing-wen in July 2016

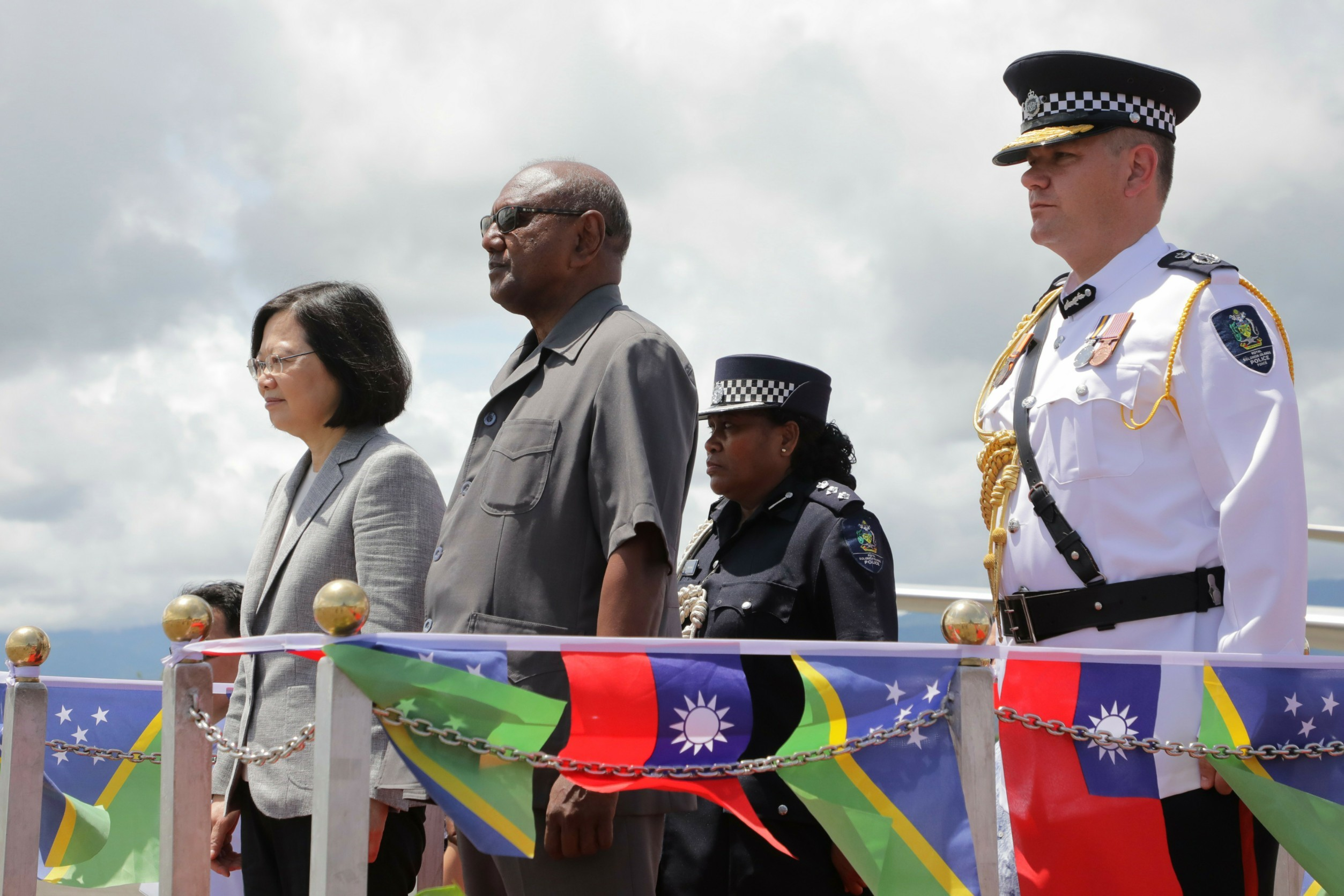
Picture from President Tsai Ing-wen's state visit to Solomon Islands in November 2017

The two countries established diplomatic relations on May 23, 1983. A ROC consulate general in Honiara was upgraded to an embassy two years later. Since 2011, the ROC's ambassador to the Solomons has been Laurie Chan, a Solomon Islands national of Chinese ethnic background, and a former Solomon Islands Minister of Foreign Affairs who supported his country's continued relations with Taiwan.

Beginning in October 2000, the Taiwanese government extended both grants and loans to the Solomon Islands, whose central government was in an economic crisis due to ongoing civil conflict.

Despite a lack of diplomatic recognition, Solomon Islands trades more with the PRC than with Taiwan. In 2009, over half the country's exports went to the PRC, and Solomon Islands maintained a trade surplus of A$161m in its trade relations with that country. In 2010, that surplus increased to a record A$258m.

In 2006, Honiara's Chinatown suffered extensive damage as it was looted and burned by rioters, following a contested election result. It had been alleged that ethnic Chinese businessmen had bribed members of Solomon Islands' Parliament. Joses Tuhanuku, President of the Solomon Islands Labour Party, stated that the election "has been corrupted by Taiwan and business houses owned by Solomon Islanders of Chinese origin". Many Chinese-Solomon Islanders left the country.

After pro-Taiwan Prime Minister Manasseh Sogavare was ousted in a vote of no confidence in December 2007, and replaced by Derek Sikua, ROC President Chen telephoned Prime Minister Sikua, offering his congratulations and Taiwan's continued aid, and requested the Sikua government's continued diplomatic support. Chen also invited Sikua to visit Taiwan, which he did in March 2008. Sikua was welcomed with military honours by Chen, who stated: "Taiwan is the Solomon Islands' most loyal ally. [...] Taiwan will never forsake the people or government of the Solomon Islands." Solomon Islands has continued to recognise the ROC under Sikua's leadership.

Later that same month, Taiwan's president-elect Ma met Australia's former Foreign Minister Alexander Downer, and reportedly promised to put an end to Taiwanese "cheque book diplomacy" in the Solomons. This led Downer to comment: "Under the Chen Shui-bian regime there has been a lot of Taiwanese cheque book diplomacy in Solomon Islands. So I'm glad to hear that's coming to an end." Sikua, however, criticised Downer for interfering in relations between Honiara and Taipei:

"The Government of Solomon Islands will continue to work closely with the Government of Taiwan and other development partners as it strives to provide a better quality of life for its people. I hope that Mr Downer will find something more appropriate to comment on than on issues that are within the sovereign jurisdiction of independent states and governments to deal with and decide on."

The editor of the Solomon Star reacted to Downer's comments, saying:

"Just when we thought he's gone and good riddance, he's back. Alexander Downer is now in Taipei and telling the Taiwanese how to run their relations with the Solomon Islands. [...] Just who does Mr Downer think he is? [...] Relations between Taiwan and the Solomon Islands are none of this yesterday man's business. Taipei should tell Mr Downer to butt out."

The Taiwanese government subsequently stated, through its deputy director-general of the Ministry of Foreign Affairs' Department of East Asian and Pacific Affairs, Victor Yu, that Downer had "misunderstood" Ma:

"Cooperation and development programs are an obligation and the responsibility of every advanced nation in the international community. They should not be described as 'checkbook diplomacy'. [...] All the resources that the nation has contributed are project-oriented and have generated substantial positive effects on the local economy and on society. Downer distorted what Ma actually meant."

In July, it was announced that Taiwanese doctors would be providing free medical care to Solomon Islands villagers, and that unskilled Solomon Islands workers would be granted access to the Taiwanese labour market. At the same time, Taiwan was funding rural development projects in the Solomons. Taiwan has also pledged to provide SI$10 million to Solomon Islands in 2009 and 2010, to enable the government to abolish school fees paid by parents and provide free primary and secondary education to Solomon Islands children.

In June 2019, secret negotiations with Australia were reported that involved Solomon Islands reassessing if they wanted to switch recognition to the PRC with an internal deadline of mid-September to make a change or leave the status quo. In early September, they announced their intention to change recognition to the PRC. On 16 September, it officially broke its ties with Taiwan, switching its recognition to the PRC.

In June 2020 the Premier of Malaita Province Daniel Suidani, a critic of the switch in recognition, accepted rice from Taiwan as state aid. This was criticised by the national government, who called on him to respect the country's foreign policy. In addition, Suidani banned Chinese companies from Malaita province and accepted American developmental assistance. In February 2023, Suidani was ousted following a no-confidence vote at Malaita's provincial assembly, which was boycotted by Suidani's supporters.
