= List of diplomatic missions of Solomon Islands =

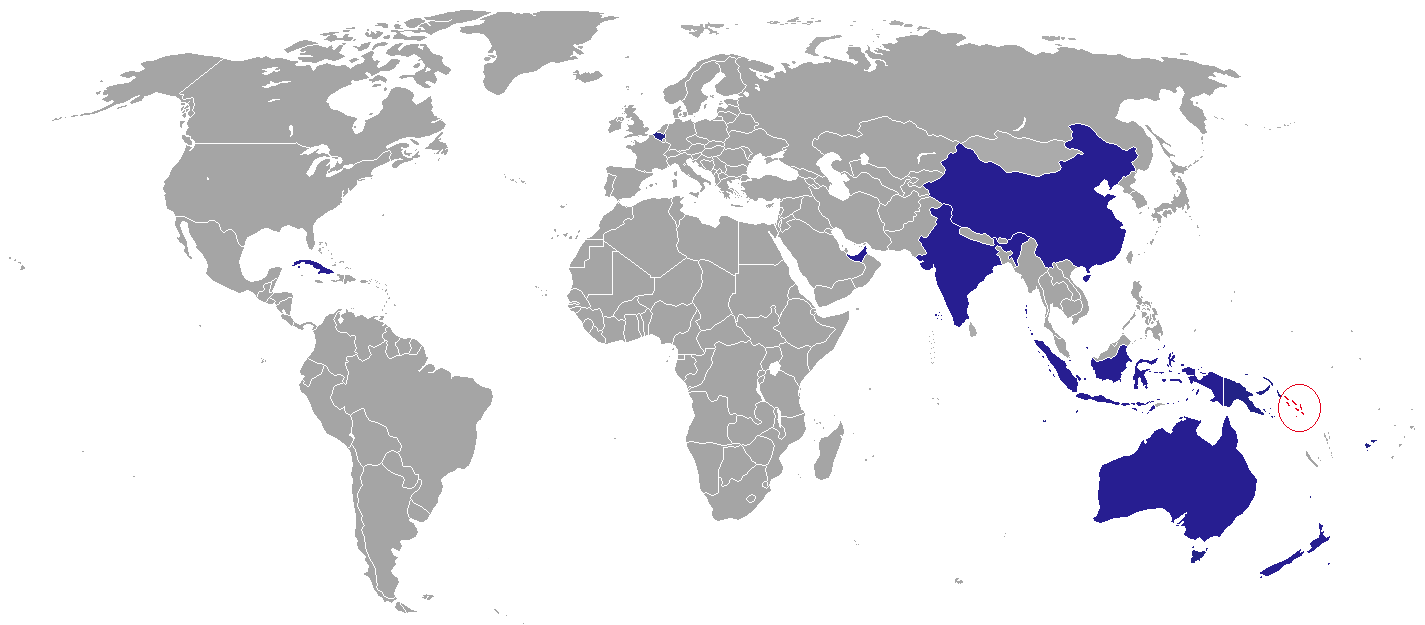
Location of diplomatic missions of Solomon Islands: Solomon Islands Embassy or High Commission

This is a list of diplomatic missions of Solomon Islands. Solomon Islands only has a very few diplomatic missions abroad.

== Americas ==
- Cuba
  - Havana (Embassy)

== Asia ==
- China
  - Beijing (Embassy)
- India
  - New Delhi (High Commission)
- Indonesia
  - Jakarta (Embassy) (Note: Also accredited to Malaysia.)
- United Arab Emirates
  - Abu Dhabi (Embassy) (Note: Also accredited to Qatar & Saudi Arabia.)

== Europe ==
- Belgium
  - Brussels (Embassy) (Note: Also accredited to France, Germany, Netherlands, Organisation of African, Caribbean and Pacific States, United Nations, and World Trade Organization.)

== Oceania ==
- Australia
  - Canberra (High Commission)
  - Brisbane (Consulate-General)
- Fiji
  - Suva (High Commission)
- New Zealand
  - Wellington (High Commission)
- Papua New Guinea
  - Port Moresby (High Commission)

== Multilateral organisations ==
- United Nations
  - New York City (Permanent Mission) (Note: Also accredited to Canada & Guatemala.)
- UNESCO
  - Paris (Permanent Delegation)

== Gallery ==
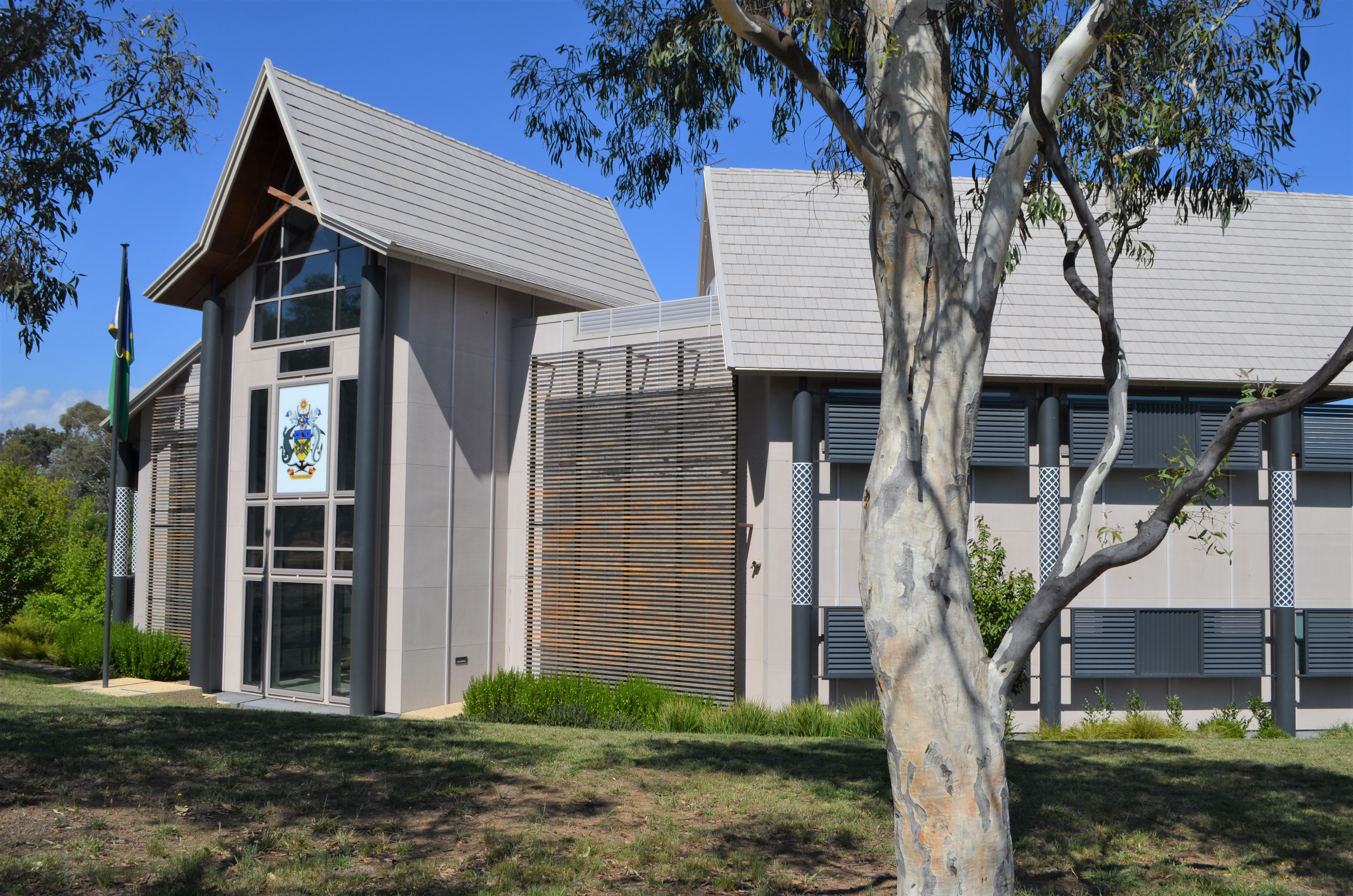
High Commission in Canberra

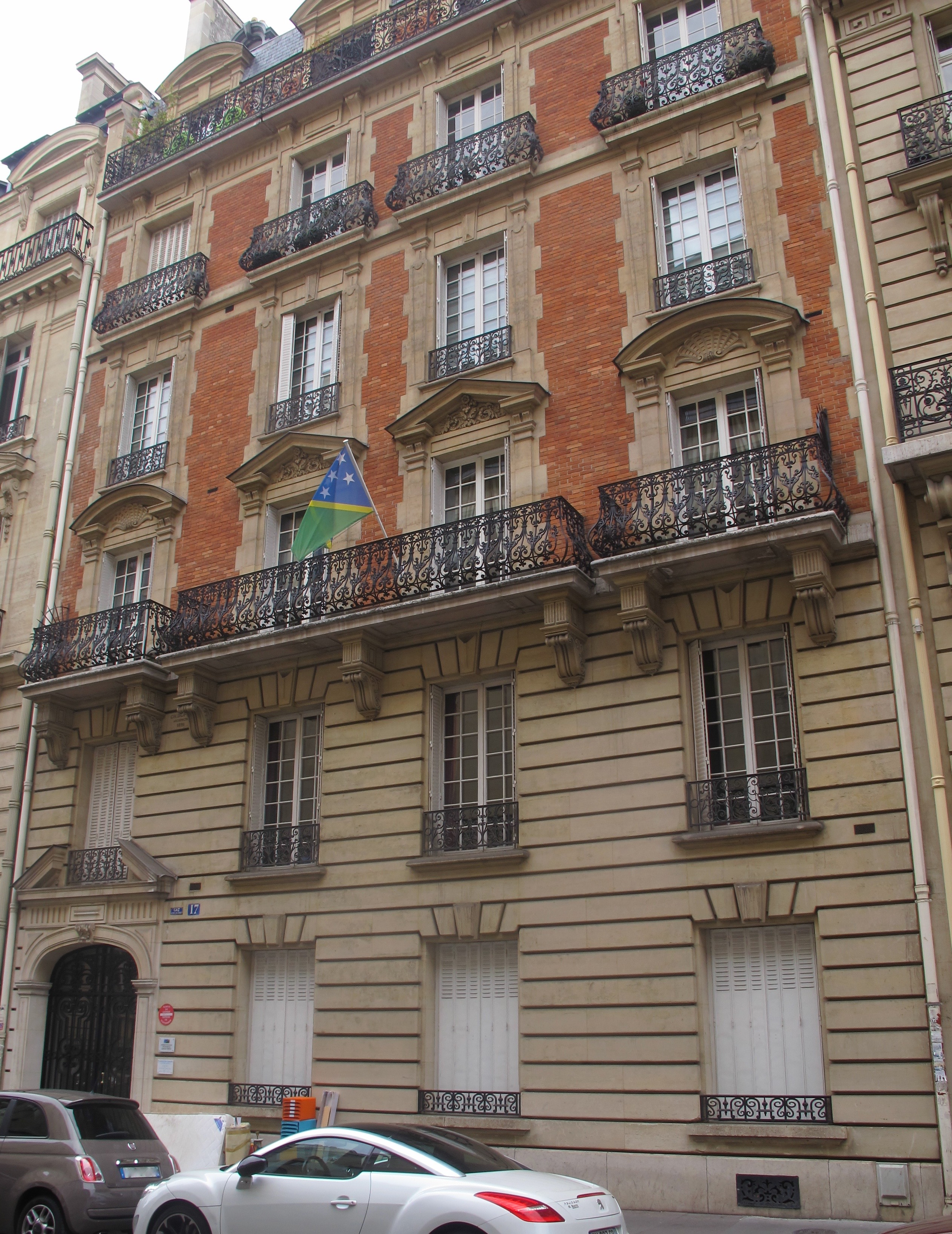
Permanent Delegation to UNESCO in Paris

== Non-Resident Embassies and High Commissions ==
If name of cities is not mentioned, then the location is in Canberra

- Afghanistan (Jakarta)
- Albania (Geneva)
- Angola (Canberra)
- Antigua and Barbuda (Havana)
- Argentina (Havana)
- Algeria (London)
- Austria (Geneva)
- Bangladesh (Kuala Lumpur)
- Barbados (Havana)
- Bahrain (Jakarta)
- Bosnia and Herzegovina (Geneva)
- Brazil (Havana)
- Bolivia (Havana)
- Belize (New York City)
- Bulgaria (Geneva)
- Brunei (Kuala Lumpur)
- Bhutan (Jakarta)
- Botswana
- Czechia (Brussels)
- Central African Republic (Geneva)
- Cameroon (Geneva)
- Congo
- Cambodia (Kuala Lumpur)
- Chad (Geneva)
- Cape Verde (London)
- Costa Rica (New York City)
- Chile (New York City)
- Croatia (Geneva)
- Cook Islands (Wellington)
- Colombia (New York City)
- Cyprus (Geneva)
- DR Congo
- Dominican Republic (Havana)
- Dominica (Havana)
- Egypt (Geneva)
- El Salvador (New York City)
- Equatorial Guinea
- Ecuador (New York City)
- Finland (Brussels)
- Gabon
- Greece (Geneva)
- Ghana (London)
- Guinea (London)
- Grenada (Havana)
- Guyana (Havana)
- Guinea-Bissau (London)
- Haiti (Havana)
- Hungary (Geneva)
- Honduras (New York City)
- Hong Kong (Kuala Lumpur)
- Italy (Geneva)
- Iceland (London)
- Ireland (London)
- Ivory Coast (London)
- Iran (Kuala Lumpur)
- Iraq (Geneva)
- Jordan (Geneva)
- Japan (Kuala Lumpur)
- Jamaica (Havana)
- Kazakhstan (Kuala Lumpur)
- Kenya
- Kiribati (Suva)
- Kuwait (Jakarta)
- Lesotho
- Laos (Kuala Lumpur)
- Libya (Geneva)
- Lebanon (Geneva)
- Luxembourg (Brussels)
- Latvia (Brussels)
- Lithuania (Brussels)
- Mali (London)
- Federated States of Micronesia (Port Moresby)
- Malawi
- Maldives (Jakarta)
- Macau (Kuala Lumpur)
- Madagascar
- Marshall Islands (Suva)
- Morocco (London)
- Mexico (New York City)
- Mozambique
- Moldova (Geneva)
- Mongolia (Kuala Lumpur)
- Montenegro (Geneva)
- Namibia
- Nauru
- Norway (Brussels)
- North Macedonia (Geneva)
- Nicaragua (New York City)
- Nigeria (London)
- Niger (London)
- Niue (Wellington)
- Nepal (Jakarta)
- Portugal (London)
- Peru (New York City)
- Panama (New York City)
- North Korea (Jakarta)
- Oman (Jakarta)
- Paraguay (Havana)
- Palestine (Geneva)
- Pakistan (Jakarta)
- Palau (Port Moresby)
- Philippines (Port Moresby)
- Russia (Geneva)
- Romania (Geneva)
- South Africa
- Saint Kitts and Nevis (Havana)
- Saint Lucia (Havana)
- Slovakia (Geneva)
- Slovenia (Geneva)
- Samoa (Suva)
- Serbia (Geneva)
- South Korea (Kuala Lumpur)
- Syria (Geneva)
- Senegal (London)
- Saint Vincent and the Grenadines (Havana)
- Sweden (Brussels)
- Sudan (Geneva)
- Singapore (Jakarta)
- Sri Lanka (Jakarta)
- Suriname (Havana)
- Eswatini
- São Tomé and Príncipe
- Togo (London)
- Thailand (Jakarta)
- Tanzania
- Turkmenistan (Kuala Lumpur)
- Tajikistan (Kuala Lumpur)
- Tunisia (London)
- Timor-Leste (Port Moresby)
- Tuvalu (Suva)
- Turkey (Geneva)
- Trinidad and Tobago (Havana)
- Tonga (Suva)
- United Arab Emirates (Jakarta)
- Uzbekistan (Kuala Lumpur)
- Uruguay (Havana)
- Uganda
- Vanuatu (Honiara)
- Venezuela (Havana)
- Vietnam (Kuala Lumpur)
- Yemen (Jakarta)
- Zimbabwe
- Zambia

== See also ==
- Foreign relations of Solomon Islands
- List of diplomatic missions in Solomon Islands
