= List of diplomatic missions in Solomon Islands =

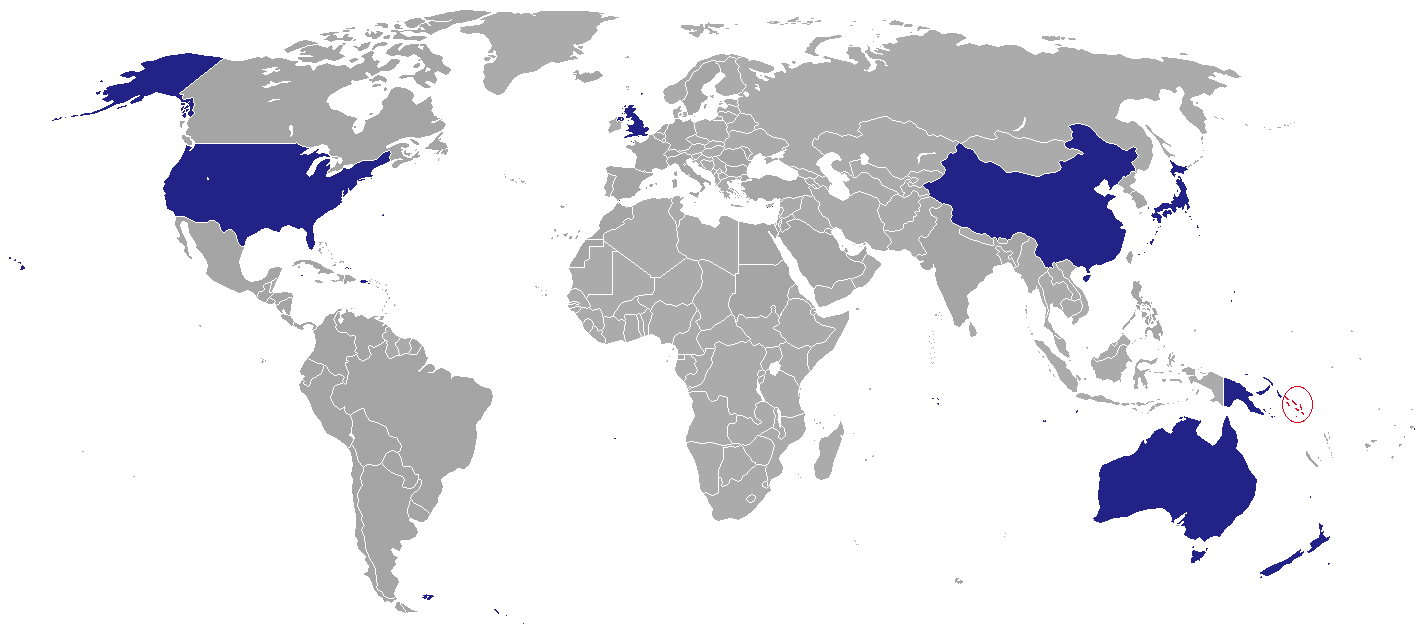
Diplomatic missions in Solomon Islands

Honiara, the capital city of the Solomon Islands, currently hosts only seven embassies. Several other countries are represented by either their embassies in Canberra or Port Moresby.

== Embassies/High Commissions in Honiara ==
1. Australia
2. China
3. Japan
4. New Zealand
5. Papua New Guinea
6. United Kingdom
7. United States

== Other posts in Honiara ==
- European Union

== Gallery ==
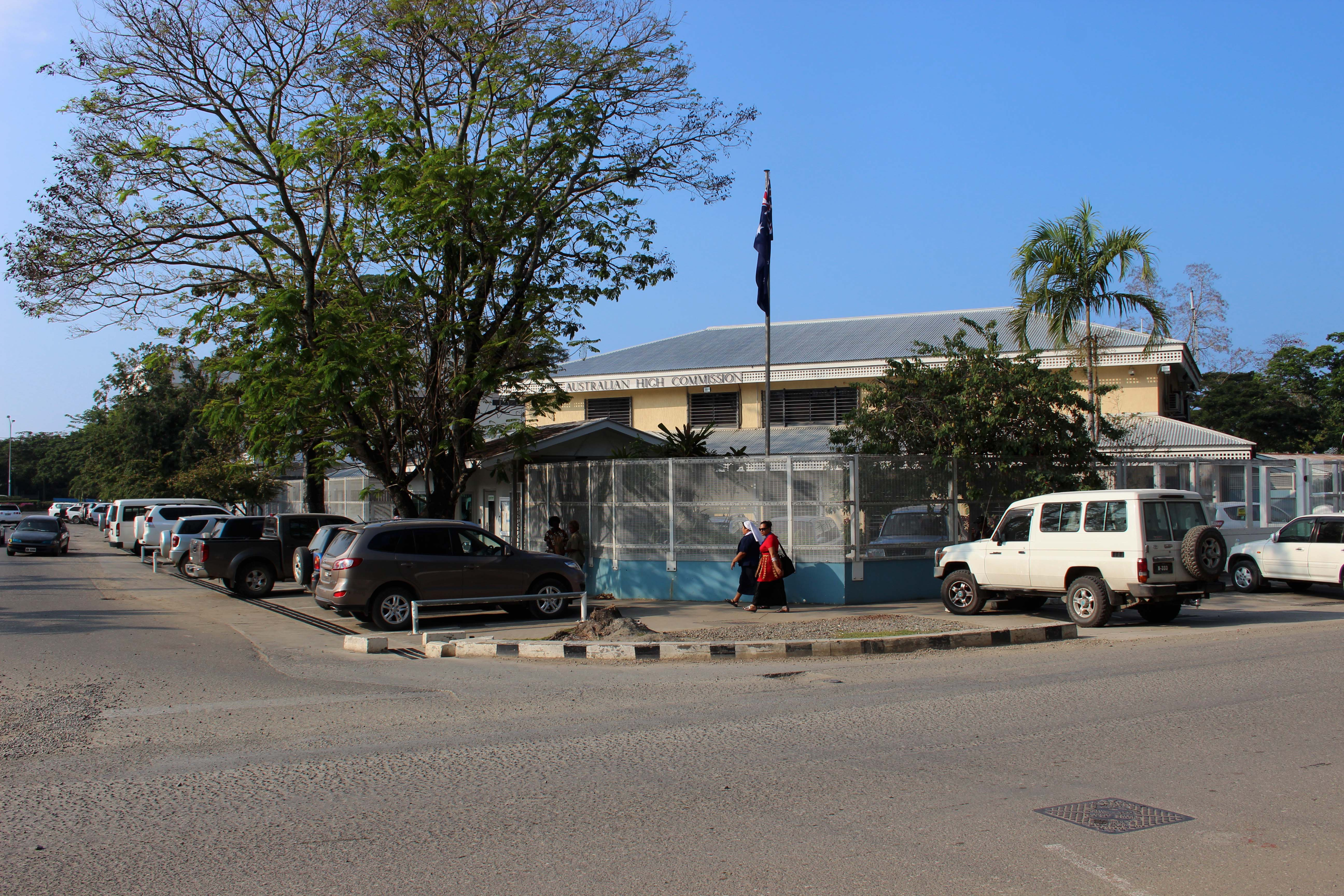
High Commission of Australia

== Non-resident embassies and high commissions ==
Resident in Canberra, unless otherwise noted.

- Afghanistan
- Algeria
- Australia
- Austria
- Belgium
- Botswana
- Brazil
- Canada
- Colombia
- Croatia (Jakarta)
- Cuba
- Cyprus
- Denmark (Singapore)
- Egypt
- Fiji (Port Moresby)
- Finland
- France (Port Moresby)
- Germany
- Guinea (Tokyo)
- Greece
- Guatemala (New York City)
- Guinea-Bissau (Beijing)
- Holy See (Port Moresby)
- Haiti (Tokyo)
- India (Port Moresby)
- Indonesia (Port Moresby)
- Ireland
- Israel (Jerusalem)
- Italy
- Ivory Coast (Tokyo)
- Kyrgyzstan (Tokyo)
- Libya
- Lesotho (Tokyo)
- Maldives (Kuala Lumpur)
- Malaysia (Port Moresby)
- Morocco
- Malta (Valletta)
- Mexico
- Norway
- Netherlands
- Portugal
- Pakistan (Wellington)
- Palestine
- Philippines (Port Moresby)
- Portugal
- Romania
- Serbia
- Seychelles (New York City)
- Sierra Leone (Beijing)
- Singapore (Port Moresby)
- South Africa
- Saudi Arabia
- South Korea (Port Moresby)
- Spain
- Sweden (Stockholm)
- Switzerland
- Swaziland (Kuala Lumpur)
- Thailand
- Togo
- Turkmenistan (Tokyo)
- Turkey
- Tunisia (Tokyo)
- United Arab Emirates
- Ukraine
- Uganda
- Vietnam
- Zimbabwe (Tokyo)
- Zambia (Tokyo)

== Former Embassies ==
- Republic of China (Taiwan) (Closed 2019)

== See also ==
- Foreign relations of Solomon Islands
- List of diplomatic missions of Solomon Islands
