= ISO 3166-2:NR =

Entry for Naoero in ISO 3166-2

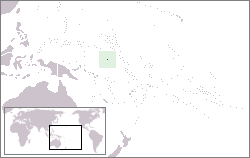
Location of Naoero

ISO 3166-2:NR is the entry for Nauru, listed by its official name Naoero, in ISO 3166-2, part of the ISO 3166 standard published by the International Organization for Standardization (ISO), which defines codes for the names of the principal subdivisions (e.g., provinces or states) of all countries coded in ISO 3166-1.

Currently for Naoero, ISO 3166-2 codes are defined for 14 districts.

Each code consists of two parts, separated by a hyphen. The first part is NR, the ISO 3166-1 alpha-2 code of Naoero. The second part is two digits (01–14).

== Current codes ==
Subdivision names are listed as in the ISO 3166-2 standard published by the ISO 3166 Maintenance Agency (ISO 3166/MA).

Click on the button in the header to sort each column.

Code	Subdivision name (na, en)
NR-01	Aiwo
NR-02	Anabar
NR-03	Anetan
NR-04	Anibare
NR-05	Baitsi (local variant is Baiti)
NR-06	Boe
NR-07	Buada
NR-08	Denigomodu
NR-09	Ewa
NR-10	Ijuw
NR-11	Meneng
NR-12	Nibok
NR-13	Uaboe
NR-14	Yaren

== Changes ==
The following changes to the entry have been announced by the ISO 3166/MA since the first publication of ISO 3166-2 in 1998. ISO stopped issuing newsletters in 2013.

Newsletter	Date issued	Description of change in newsletter	Code/Subdivision change
Newsletter I-8	2007-04-17	Addition of the administrative subdivisions and of their code elements	Subdivisions added: 14 districts
Newsletter II-3	2011-12-13 (corrected 2011-12-15)	Local generic administrative term addition.	
Online Browsing; Platform (OBP)	2017-11-23	Change of subdivision name of NR-05; addition of local variation of NR-05, update List Source	Name changed: NR-05 Baiti → Baitsi

== See also ==
- Subdivisions of Nauru
- FIPS region codes of Nauru
