= List of FIPS region codes (M–O) =

This is a list of FIPS 10-4 region codes from M-O, using a standardized name format, and cross-linking to articles.

On September 2, 2008, FIPS 10-4 was one of ten standards withdrawn by NIST as a Federal Information Processing Standard. The list here is the last version of codes. For earlier versions, see link below.

== MA: Madagascar ==
FIPS Code	Region
MA01	Antsiranana Province
MA02	Fianarantsoa Province
MA03	Mahajanga Province
MA04	Toamasina Province
MA05	Antananarivo Province
MA06	Toliara Province

== MC: Macau ==
FIPS Code	Region
MC01	Ilhas, Macau
MC02	Macau, Macau

== MD: Moldova ==
FIPS Code	Region
MD51	Găgăuzia Autonomous Territorial Unit
MD57	Chişinău
MD58	Stînga Nistrului
MD59	Anenii Noi District
MD60	Bălţi
MD61	Basarabeasca District
MD62	Bender Municipality
MD63	Briceni District
MD64	Cahul District
MD65	Cantemir District
MD66	Călăraşi District
MD67	Căuşeni District
MD68	Cimişlia District
MD69	Criuleni District
MD70	Donduşeni District
MD71	Drochia District
MD72	Dubăsari District
MD73	Edineţ District
MD74	Făleşti District
MD75	Floreşti District
MD76	Glodeni District
MD77	Hînceşti District
MD78	Ialoveni District
MD79	Leova District
MD80	Nisporeni District
MD81	Ocnița District
MD82	Orhei District
MD83	Rezina District
MD84	Rîşcani District
MD85:	Sîngerei District
MD86	Şoldăneşti District
MD87	Soroca District
MD88	Ştefan Vodă District
MD89	Străşeni District
MD90	Taraclia District
MD91	Teleneşti District
MD92	Ungheni District

== MG: Mongolia ==
FIPS Code	Region
MG01	Arkhangai Province
MG02	Bayankhongor Province
MG03	Bayan-Ölgii Province
MG06	Dornod Province
MG07	Dornogovi Province
MG08	Dundgovi Province
MG09	Zavkhan Province
MG10	Govi-Altai Province
MG11	Khentii Province
MG12	Khovd Province
MG13	Khövsgöl Province
MG14	Ömnögovi Province
MG15	Övörkhangai Province
MG16	Selenge Province
MG17	Sükhbaatar Province
MG18	Töv Province
MG19	Uvs Province
MG20	Ulaanbaatar
MG21	Bulgan Province
MG23	Darkhan-Uul Province
MG24	Govisümber Province
MG25	Orkhon Province

== MH: Montserrat ==
FIPS Code	Region
MH01	Saint Anthony Parish, Montserrat
MH02	Saint Georges Parish, Montserrat
MH03	Saint Peter Parish, Montserrat

== MI: Malawi ==
FIPS Code	Region
MI02	Chikwawa District
MI03	Chiradzulu District
MI04	Chitipa District
MI05	Thyolo District
MI06	Dedza District
MI07	Dowa District
MI08	Karonga District
MI09	Kasungu District
MI11	Lilongwe District
MI12	Mangochi District
MI13	Mchinji District
MI15	Mzimba District
MI16	Ntcheu District
MI17	Nkhata Bay District
MI18	Nkhotakota District
MI19	Nsanje District
MI20	Ntchisi District
MI21	Rumphi District
MI22	Salima District
MI23	Zomba District
MI24	Blantyre District
MI25	Mwanza District
MI26	Balaka District
MI27	Likoma District
MI28	Machinga District
MI29	Mulanje District
MI30	Phalombe District

== MK: North Macedonia ==
- MK01: Aračinovo Municipality
- MK02: Bač
- MK03: Belčišta
- MK04: Berovo Municipality
- MK05: Bistrica, Bitola
- MK06: Bitola Municipality
- MK07: Blatec Opština, North Macedonia
- MK08: Bogdanci Municipality
- MK09: Bogomila
- MK10: Bogovinje Municipality
- MK11: Bosilovo Municipality
- MK12: Brvenica Municipality
- MK14: Capari
- MK15: Čaška Municipality
- MK16: Čegrane Municipality
- MK19: Češinovo-Obleševo Municipality
- MK20: Čučer-Sandevo Municipality
- MK21: Debar Municipality
- MK22: Delčevo Municipality
- MK23: Delogoždi Opština, North Macedonia
- MK24: Demir Hisar Municipality
- MK25: Demir Kapija Municipality
- MK26: Dobruševo
- MK27: Dolna Banjica
- MK28: Dolneni Municipality
- MK30: Drugovo Municipality
- MK31: Džepčište
- MK33: Gevgelija Municipality
- MK34: Gostivar Municipality
- MK35: Gradsko Municipality
- MK36: Ilinden Municipality
- MK37: Čaška Municipality
- MK38: Jegunovce Municipality
- MK39: Kamenjane
- MK40: Karbinci Municipality
- MK41: Karpoš Municipality
- MK42: Kavadarci Municipality
- MK43: Kičevo Municipality
- MK44: Kisela Voda Municipality
- MK45: Klečevce Opština, North Macedonia
- MK46: Kočani Municipality
- MK47: Konče Municipality
- MK48: Kondovo, Saraj
- MK49: Konopište, North Macedonia
- MK50: Kosel, North Macedonia
- MK51: Kratovo Municipality
- MK52: Kriva Palanka Municipality
- MK53: Krivogaštani Municipality
- MK54: Kruševo Municipality
- MK55: Kukliš
- MK56: Kukurečani
- MK57: Kumanovo Municipality
- MK58: Labuništa
- MK59: Lipkovo Municipality
- MK60: Lozovo Municipality
- MK61: Lukovo, Struga
- MK62: Makedonska Kamenica Municipality
- MK63: Makedonski Brod Municipality
- MK64: Mavrovi Anovi
- MK65: Mešeišta
- MK66: Miravci
- MK67: Mogila Municipality
- MK68: Murtino
- MK69: Negotino Municipality
- MK70: Negotino-Pološko Opština, North Macedonia
- MK71: Novaci Municipality
- MK72: Novo Selo Municipality
- MK73: Češinovo-Obleševo Municipality
- MK74: Ohrid Municipality
- MK75: Orašac, Kumanovo
- MK76: Orizari Opština, North Macedonia
- MK77: Oslomej Municipality
- MK78: Pehčevo Municipality
- MK79: Petrovec Municipality
- MK80: Plasnica Municipality
- MK81: Podareš
- MK82: Prilep Municipality
- MK83: Probištip Municipality
- MK84: Radoviš Municipality
- MK85: Rankovce Municipality
- MK86: Resen Municipality
- MK87: Rosoman Municipality
- MK88: Rostuša
- MK89: Samokov
- MK90: Saraj Municipality
- MK91: Šipkovica
- MK92: Sopište Municipality
- MK93: Sopotnica, Demir Hisar
- MK94: Srbinovo
- MK95: Staravina
- MK96: Star Dojran Municipality
- MK97: Staro Nagoričane Municipality
- MK98: Štip Municipality
- MK99: Struga Municipality
- MKA1: Strumica Municipality
- MKA2: Studeničani Municipality
- MKA3: Šuto Orizari Municipality
- MKA4: Sveti Nikole Municipality
- MKA5: Tearce Municipality
- MKA6: Tetovo Municipality
- MKA7: Topolčani
- MKA8: Valandovo Municipality
- MKA9: Vasilevo Municipality
- MKB1: Veles Municipality
- MKB2: Velešta
- MKB3: Vevčani Municipality
- MKB4: Vinica Municipality, North Macedonia
- MKB5: Vitolište
- MKB6: Vraneštica Municipality
- MKB7: Vrapčište Municipality
- MKB8: Vratnica
- MKB9: Vrutok
- MKC1: Zajas Municipality
- MKC2: Zelenikovo Municipality
- MKC3: Želino Municipality
- MKC4: Žitoše
- MKC5: Zletovo
- MKC6: Zrnovci Municipality

== ML: Mali ==
FIPS Code	Region
ML01	Bamako
ML03	Kayes Region
ML04	Mopti Region
ML05	Ségou Region
ML06	Sikasso Region
ML07	Koulikoro Region
ML08	Tombouctou Region
ML09	Gao Region
ML10	Kidal Region

== MO: Morocco ==
FIPS Code	Region
MO45	Grand Casablanca
MO46	Fès-Boulemane
MO47	Marrakesh-Tensift-El Haouz
MO48	Meknès-Tafilalet
MO49	Rabat-Salé-Zemmour-Zaer
MO50	Chaouia-Ouardigha
MO51	Doukkala-Abda
MO52	Gharb-Chrarda-Béni Hssen
MO53	Guelmim-Es Semara
MO54	Oriental
MO55	Souss-Massa-Drâa
MO56	Tadla-Azilal
MO57	Tangier-Tetouan
MO58	Taza-Al Hoceima-Taounate
MO59	Laâyoune-Boujdour-Sakia El Hamra

== MP: Mauritius ==
FIPS Code	Region
MP12	Black River District, Mauritius
MP13	Flacq
MP14	Grand Port
MP15	Moka District, Mauritius
MP16	Pamplemousses
MP17	Plaines Wilhems
MP18	Port Louis District, Mauritius
MP19	Rivière du Rempart District, Mauritius
MP20	Savanne
MP21	Agaléga Islands
MP22	Cargados Carajos
MP23	Rodrigues Dependency, Mauritius

== MR: Mauritania ==
FIPS Code	Region
MR01	Hodh Ech Chargui Première Region, Mauritania
MR02	Hodh El Gharbi Deuxième Region, Mauritania
MR03	Assaba Troisième Region, Mauritania
MR04	Gorgol Quatrième Region, Mauritania
MR05	Brakna Cinquième Region, Mauritania
MR06	Trarza Sixième Region, Mauritania
MR07	Adrar Septième Region, Mauritania
MR08	Dakhlet Nouadhibou Huitième Region, Mauritania
MR09	Tagant Neuvième Region, Mauritania
MR10	Guidimaka Dixième Region, Mauritania
MR11	Tiris Zemmour Onzième Region, Mauritania
MR12	Inchiri Douzième Region, Mauritania

== MT: Malta ==
FIPS Code	Region
MT00	Malta (city-state)

== MU: Oman ==
FIPS Code	Region
MU01	Ad Dakhiliyah Region
MU02	Al Batinah Region
MU03	Al Wusta Region
MU04	Ash Sharqiyah Region
MU06	Muscat Governorate
MU07	Musandam Governorate
MU08	Dhofar Governorate
MU09	Ad Dhahirah Region
MU10	Al Buraimi Governorate

== MV: Maldives ==
FIPS Code	Region
MV01	Seenu Atoll
MV05	Laamu Atoll
MV30	Alifu Atoll
MV31	Baa Atoll
MV32	Dhaalu Atoll
MV33	Faafu Atoll
MV34	Gaafu Alifu Atoll
MV35	Gaafu Dhaalu Atoll
MV36	Haa Alifu Atoll
MV37	Haa Dhaalu Atoll
MV38	Kaafu Atoll
MV39	Lhaviyani Atoll
MV40	Maale, Maldives
MV41	Meemu Atoll
MV42	Gnaviyani Atoll
MV43	Noonu Atoll
MV44	Raa Atoll
MV45	Shaviyani Atoll
MV46	Thaa Atoll
MV47	Vaavu Atoll

== MX: Mexico ==
FIPS Code	Region
MX01	Aguascalientes
MX02	Baja California
MX03	Baja California Sur
MX04	Campeche
MX05	Chiapas
MX06	Chihuahua State, Mexico
MX07	Coahuila
MX08	Colima
MX09	Distrito Federal Federal District, Mexico
MX10	Durango
MX11	Guanajuato
MX12	Guerrero
MX13	Hidalgo State, Mexico
MX14	Jalisco
MX15	México State, Mexico
MX16	Michoacán
MX17	Morelos
MX18	Nayarit
MX19	Nuevo León
MX20	Oaxaca
MX21	Puebla
MX22	Querétaro
MX23	Quintana Roo
MX24	San Luis Potosí
MX25	Sinaloa
MX26	Sonora
MX27	Tabasco
MX28	Tamaulipas
MX29	Tlaxcala
MX30	Veracruz
MX31	Yucatán
MX32	Zacatecas

== MY: Malaysia ==
FIPS Code	Region
MY01	Johor
MY02	Kedah
MY03	Kelantan
MY04	Melaka State, Malaysia
MY05	Negeri Sembilan
MY06	Pahang
MY07	Perak
MY08	Perlis
MY09	Pulau Pinang State, Malaysia
MY11	Sarawak
MY12	Selangor
MY13	Terengganu
MY14	Kuala Lumpur
MY15	Labuan Federal Territory, Malaysia
MY16	Sabah
MY17	Putrajaya

== MZ: Mozambique ==
FIPS Code	Region
MZ01	Cabo Delgado Province
MZ02	Gaza Province
MZ03	Inhambane Province
MZ04	Maputo Province
MZ05	Sofala Province
MZ06	Nampula Province
MZ07	Niassa Province
MZ08	Tete Province
MZ09	Zambézia Province
MZ10	Manica Province
MZ11	Capital City of Maputo

== NG: Niger ==
FIPS Code	Region
NG01	Agadez Department, Niger
NG02	Diffa Department, Niger
NG03	Dosso Department, Niger
NG04	Maradi Department, Niger
NG06	Tahoua Department, Niger
NG07	Zinder Department, Niger
NG08	Niamey
NG09	Tillabéri Department, Niger

== NH: Vanuatu ==
FIPS Code	Region
NH07	Torba Province
NH13	Sanma Province
NH15	Tafea Province
NH16	Malampa Province
NH17	Penama Province
NH18	Shefa Province

== NI: Nigeria ==
FIPS Code	Region
NI05	Lagos State
NI11	Federal Capital Territory, Nigeria
NI16	Ogun State
NI21	Akwa Ibom State
NI22	Cross River State
NI23	Kaduna State
NI24	Katsina State
NI25	Anambra State
NI26	Benue State
NI27	Borno State
NI28	Imo State
NI29	Kano State
NI30	Kwara State
NI31	Niger State
NI32	Oyo State
NI35	Adamawa State
NI36	Delta State, Nigeria
NI37	Edo State
NI39	Jigawa State
NI40	Kebbi State
NI41	Kogi State
NI42	Osun State
NI43	Taraba State
NI44	Yobe State
NI45	Abia State
NI46	Bauchi State
NI47	Enugu State
NI48	Ondo State
NI49	Plateau State
NI50	Rivers State
NI51	Sokoto State
NI52	Bayelsa State
NI53	Ebonyi State
NI54	Ekiti State
NI55	Gombe State
NI56	Nasarawa State
NI57	Zamfara State

== NL: Netherlands ==
FIPS Code	Region
NL01	Drenthe
NL02	Friesland
NL03	Gelderland
NL04	Groningen Province
NL05	Limburg Province
NL06	North Brabant Province
NL07	North Holland Province
NL09	Utrecht Province
NL10	Zeeland
NL11	South Holland Province
NL15	Overijssel
NL16	Flevoland

== NO: Norway ==
FIPS Code	Region
NO01	Akershus
NO02	Aust-Agder
NO04	Buskerud
NO05	Finnmark
NO06	Hedmark
NO07	Hordaland
NO08	Møre og Romsdal
NO09	Nordland
NO11	Oppland
NO12	Oslo
NO13	Østfold
NO14	Rogaland
NO15	Sogn og Fjordane
NO16	Sør-Trøndelag
NO17	Telemark
NO18	Troms
NO19	Vest-Agder
NO20	Vestfold
NO21	Trøndelag

== NP: Nepal ==
FIPS Code	Region
NP01	Bagmati Zone
NP02	Bheri Zone
NP03	Dhawalagiri Zone
NP04	Gandaki Zone
NP05	Janakpur Zone
NP06	Karnali Zone
NP07	Kosi Zone
NP08	Lumbini Zone
NP09	Mahakali Zone
NP10	Mechi Zone
NP11	Narayani Zone
NP12	Rapti Zone
NP13	Sagarmatha Zone
NP14	Seti Zone

== NR: Nauru ==
FIPS Code	Region
NR01	Aiwo District
NR02	Anabar District
NR03	Anetan District
NR04	Anibare District
NR05	Baiti District
NR06	Boe District
NR07	Buada District
NR08	Denigomodu District
NR09	Ewa District
NR10	Ijuw District
NR11	Meneng District
NR12	Nibok District
NR13	Uaboe District
NR14	Yaren District

== NS: Suriname ==
FIPS Code	Region
NS10	Brokopondo District
NS11	Commewijne District
NS12	Coronie District
NS13	Marowijne District
NS14	Nickerie District
NS15	Para District
NS16	Paramaribo District
NS17	Saramacca District
NS18	Sipaliwini District
NS19	Wanica District

== NU: Nicaragua ==
FIPS Code	Region
NU01	Boaco Department
NU02	Carazo Department
NU03	Chinandega Department
NU04	Chontales Department
NU05	Estelí Department
NU06	Granada Department
NU07	Jinotega Department
NU08	León Department
NU09	Madriz Department
NU10	Managua Department
NU11	Masaya Department
NU12	Matagalpa Department
NU13	Nueva Segovia Department
NU14	Río San Juan Department
NU15	Rivas Department
NU17	North Caribbean Coast Autonomous Region
NU18	South Caribbean Coast Autonomous Region

== NZ: New Zealand ==
FIPS Code	Region
NZ10	Chatham Islands
NZE7	Auckland Region
NZE8	Bay of Plenty Region
NZE9	Canterbury region
NZF1	Gisborne Region
NZF2	Hawke's Bay Region
NZF3	Manawatū-Whanganui region
NZF4	Marlborough Region
NZF5	Nelson Region
NZF6	Northland Region
NZF7	Otago region
NZF8	Southland region
NZF9	Taranaki Region
NZG1	Waikato region
NZG2	Wellington Region
NZG3	West Coast region

Note: Tasman Region was not assigned a code for unknown reasons.

== See also ==
- List of FIPS region codes (A–C)
- List of FIPS region codes (D–F)
- List of FIPS region codes (G–I)
- List of FIPS region codes (J–L)
- List of FIPS region codes (P–R)
- List of FIPS region codes (S–U)
- List of FIPS region codes (V–Z)

== Sources ==
- FIPS 10-4 Codes and history
  - Last version of codes
  - All codes (include earlier versions)
  - Table to see the evolution of the codes over time
- Administrative Divisions of Countries ("Statoids"), Statoids.com
