= Ubenide constituency =

Ubenide
- Constituency
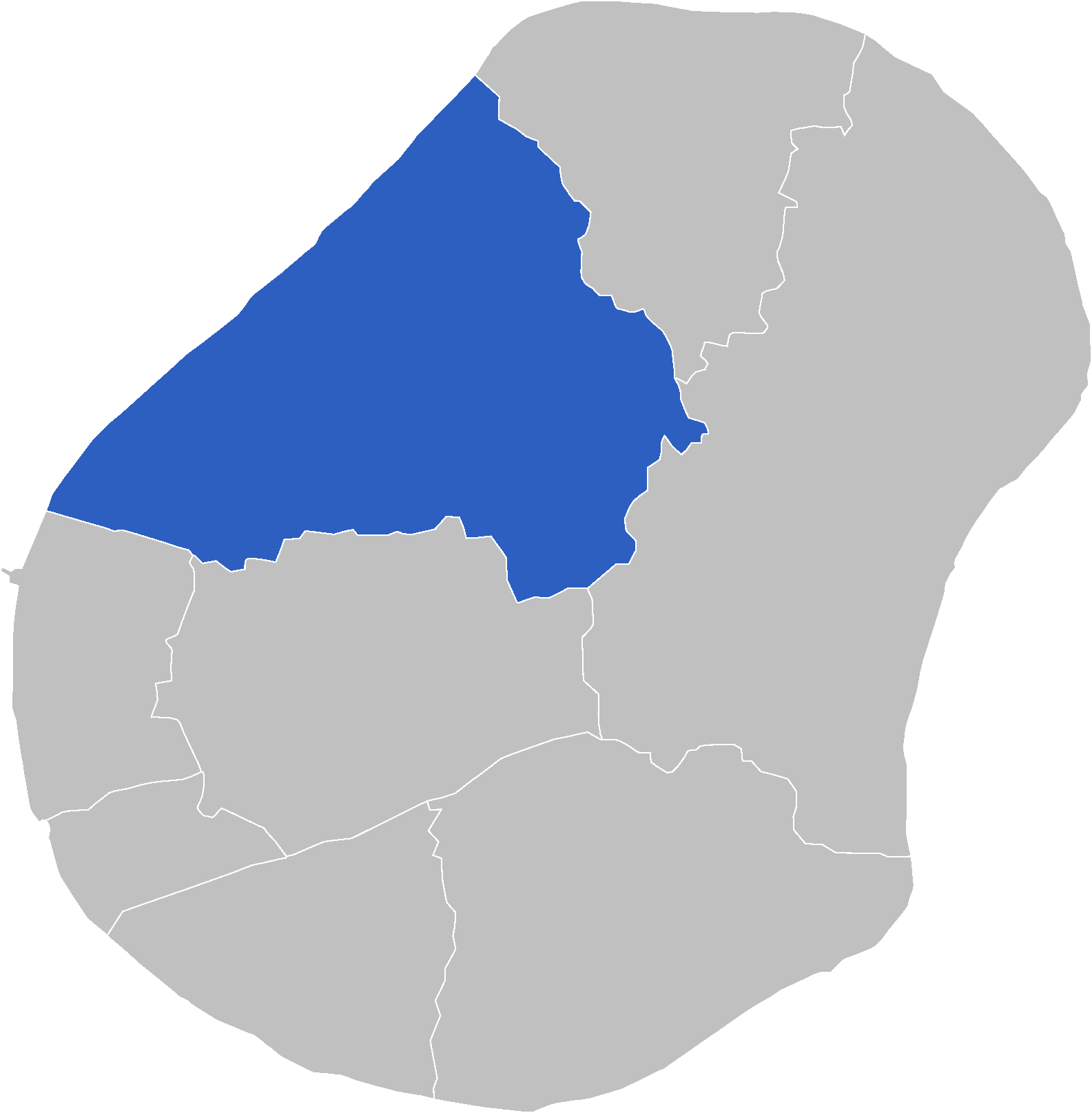
- Ubenide Constituency within Nauru
- Coordinates: 0°31′2.57″S 166°55′28.08″E
- Country: Nauru
- Districts: 4 (Baitsi, Denigomodu, Nibok, Uaboe)

Area
  - Total: 4.5 km^{2} (1.7 sq mi)

Population (2011)
  - Total: 3,300
- Time zone: (UTC+12)
- Area code: +674
- Members of Parliament: 4

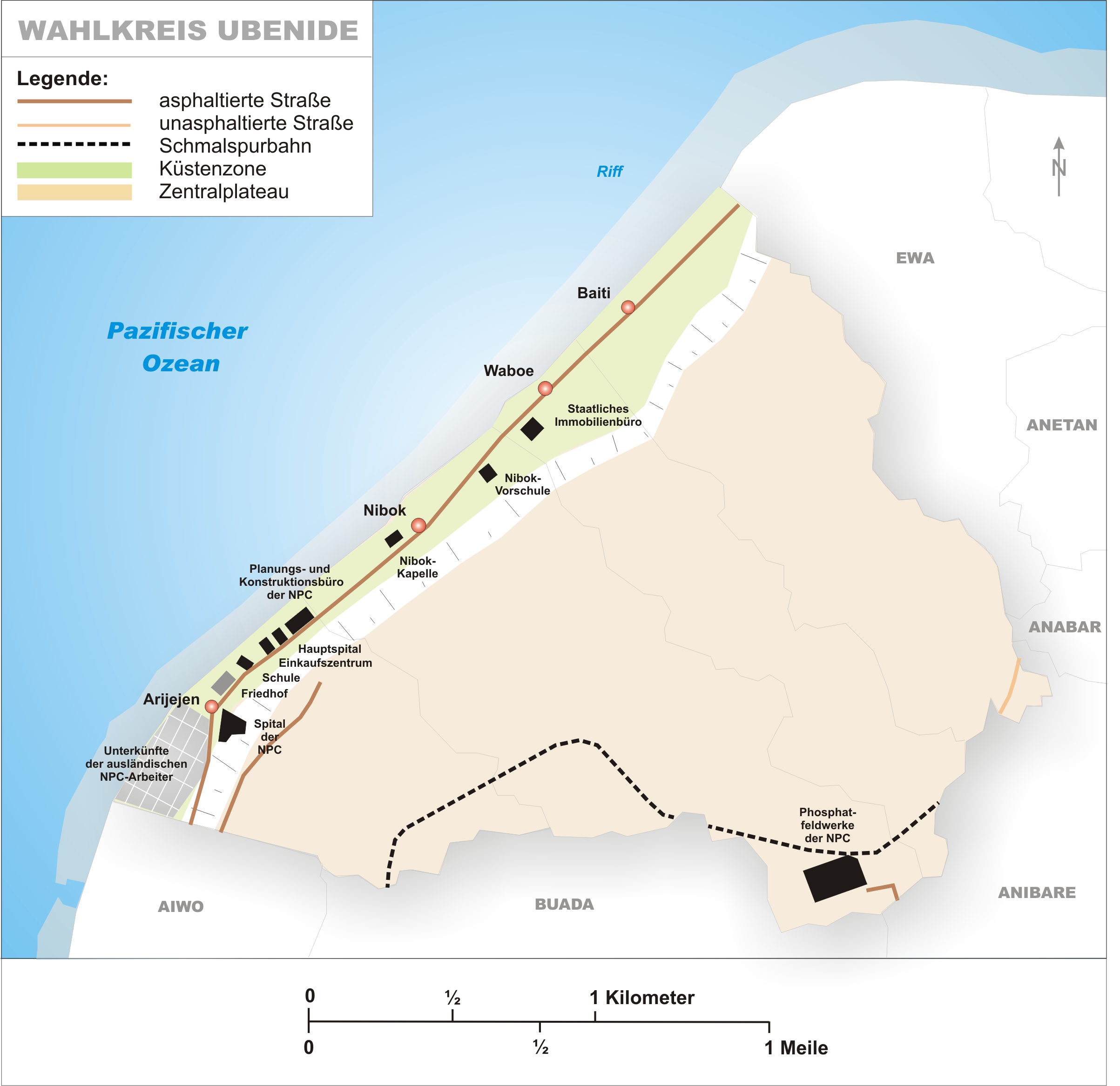
Map of Ubenide

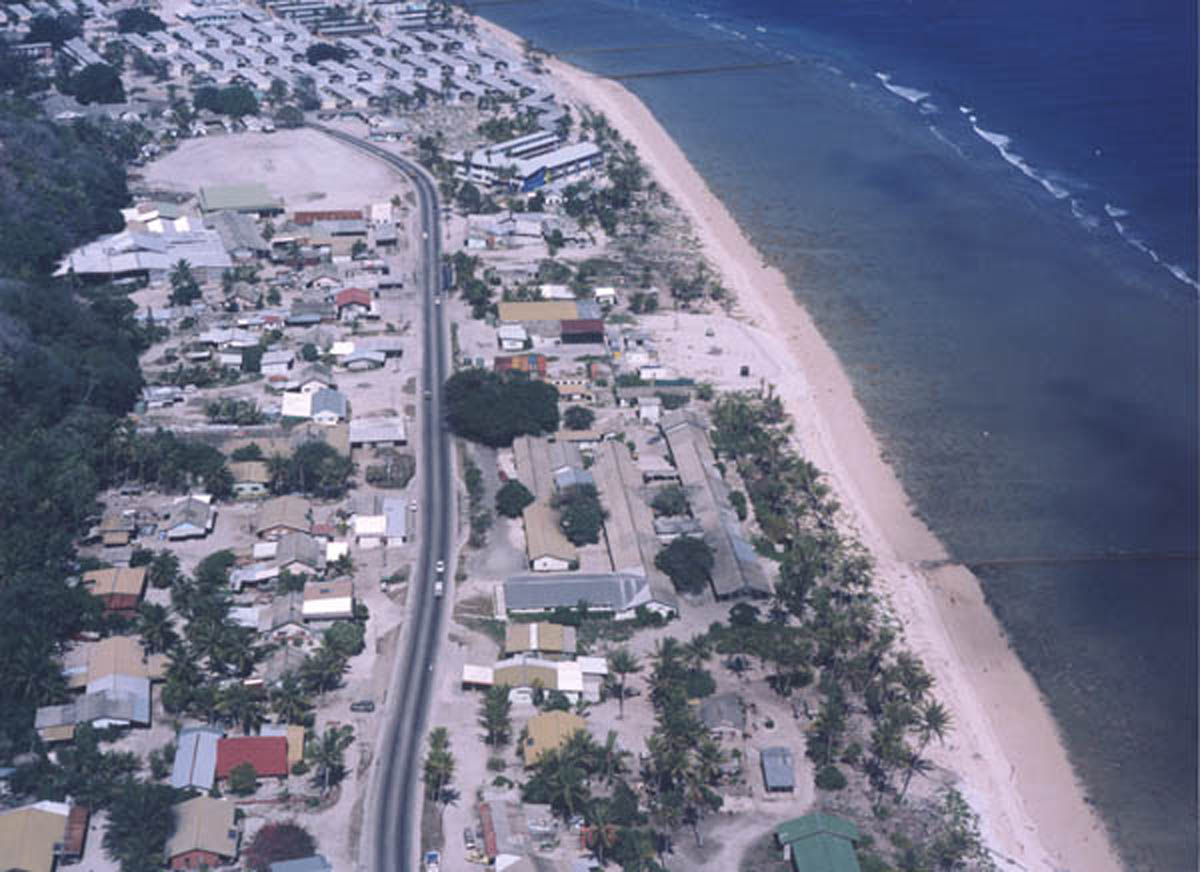
View of Denigomodu and Nibok

Ubenide is a constituency of Nauru made up of four districts: Baitsi, Denigomodu, Nibok, and Uaboe. It covers an area of 4.5 km^{2} (1.73 mi^{2}), making it the second largest constituency by area, and is the most populous constituency with a population of 3,300. It returns four members to the Parliament of Nauru in Yaren, being the only district to return four.

== Geography ==
"Ubenide" is a portmanteau combining the names of the 4 districts that comprise the constituency: Uaboe, Beidi (the old name of Baitsi), Nibok, and Denigomodu. Ubenide is located along the northeast coast of Nauru, and shares borders with the constituencies of Anetan, Anabar, Buada and Aiwo. The phosphate railway crosses through the constituency in the hills.

== Members of Parliament ==
Seat 1
Member	Term	Party
Joseph Hiram	2000–2001	Non-partisan
David Adeang	2001–Present	Nauru First
Seat 2
Member	Term	Party
Lagumot Harris	1968–1976	Non-partisan
Victor Eoaeo	1976–1977	Non-partisan
Lagumot Harris	1977–1980	Non-partisan
Kennan Adeang	1980–1988	Nauru Party/Democratic Party
Buraro Detudamo	1988–1994	Non-partisan
Aloysius Amwano	1998–2003	Non-partisan
Fabian Ribauw	2003–2008	Non-partisan
Aloysius Amwano	2008–2013	Non-partisan
Russ J. Kun	2013–present	Non-partisan
Seat 3
Member	Term	Party
Derog Gioura	1968–1971	Non-partisan
Kennan Adeang	1971	Nauru Party
Derog Gioura	1971–1973	Non-partisan
Kennan Adeang	1973–1976	Nauru Party
Derog Gioura	1976–1977	Non-partisan
Kennan Adeang	1977–1978	Nauru Party
Derog Gioura	1978–2004	Non-partisan
Valdon Dowiyogo	2004–2016	Non-partisan
Seat 4
Member	Term	Party
Victor Eoaeo	1968–1973	Non-partisan
Bernard Dowiyogo	1973–2003	Nauru Party/Democratic Party
Russell E. Kun	2003–2004	Centre Party
Freddie Pitcher	2004–2013	Nauru First
Ranin Akua	2013–present	Non-partisan

== Election results ==
Candidate	Preference votes												Total	Notes
Candidate	1	2	3	4	5	6	7	8	9	10	11	12	Total	Notes
David Adeang	450	402	262	167	86	62	52	28	23	70	59	46	837.298	Re-elected
Reagan Aliklik	330	336	149	121	84	68	59	82	71	94	103	210	668.881	Re-elected
Russ Kun	295	166	185	371	107	76	88	65	54	86	156	58	620.795	Re-elected
Ranin Akua	130	124	378	81	95	79	86	98	116	145	181	194	454.962	Elected
Vyko Pentax Adeang	164	118	100	99	101	258	93	117	150	219	183	105	436.147	
Wawani Dowiyogo	135	120	117	108	103	114	125	106	115	104	113	447	402.408	Unseated
Gregor Ruson Garoa	61	154	143	140	155	201	147	145	151	137	233	40	379.285	
George Geovani Gioura	60	81	83	128	332	184	245	218	177	93	66	40	357.783	
Sherlock Denuga	35	87	130	150	187	165	155	338	148	101	105	106	333.549	
Benedict Abouke	34	70	82	118	213	216	362	176	156	135	87	58	321.723	
Maximillian Mesrasrik Kun	8	42	50	131	146	163	141	150	302	153	221	200	259.289	
Abednego Mathew Dongobir	5	7	28	93	98	121	154	184	244	370	200	203	225.060	
Valid votes	1,707													
Invalid votes	49													
Total votes	1,756													
Source: Electoral Commission of Nauru

== Notable people ==
- Bernard Dowiyogo, 8-time President of Nauru and Member of Parliament of Ubenide from 1973 to 2003.
- Derog Gioura, who represented Ubenide in the Parliament of Nauru and served as President of Nauru in 2003.
- Russell Kun, who has served as the Republic of Nauru's Justice Minister and as the Speaker of the Parliament of Nauru, and formerly represented Ubenide in Parliament.
- David Adeang, formerly Foreign Minister, who was appointed Speaker of the Parliament of Nauru in 2008 and represents Ubenide.
- Russ Kun, 16th President of Nauru.
