= Boe district =

Boe
- District
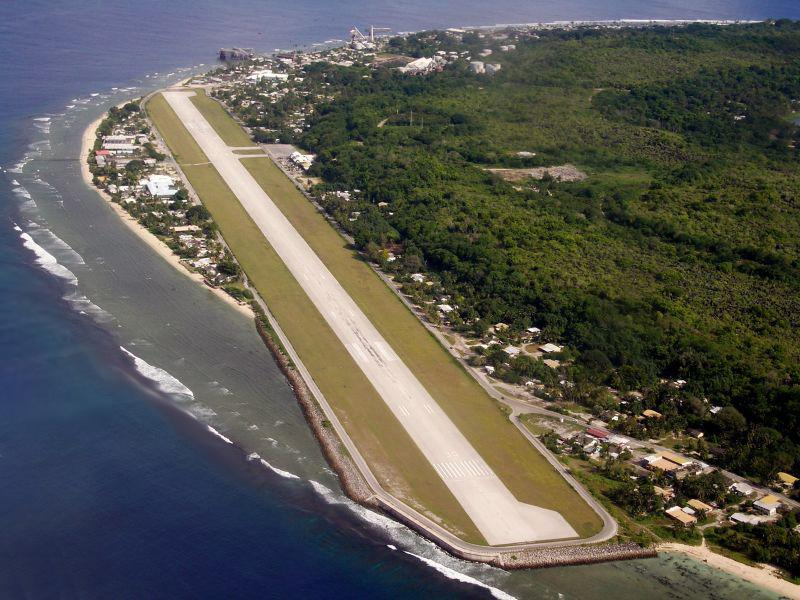
- Nauru International Airport is located between Boe and Yaren

- Boe District within Nauru
- Coordinates: 0°32′30″S 166°54′51″E
- Country: Nauru
- Constituency: Boe

Area
  - Total: 0.5 km^{2} (0.19 sq mi)
- Elevation: 15 m (49 ft)

Population (2021)
  - Total: 845
  - Density: 1,690/km^{2} (4,400/sq mi)
- Time zone: (UTC+12)
- Area code: +674

Boe is a district in the island country of Nauru. It is the only district of Boe constituency.

== History ==
On September 5, 2019, the Pacific Light House Church (Born Again Christian Church) was opened in the district.

== Geography ==
Boe is located in the southwest of the island. It borders on the districts of Aiwo, Yaren along the coastline, and Buada inland.

It covers an area of 0.5 km^{2}, and has a population of 845. It is the smallest and most densely populated district in Nauru. The elevation above sea level is about 5 metres.

== Education ==
Boe Infant School is in Boe. The primary and secondary schools serving all of Nauru are Yaren Primary School in Yaren (years 1-3), Nauru Primary School in Meneng district (years 4-6), Nauru College in Denigomodu District (years 7-9), and Nauru Secondary School (years 10-12) in Yaren district.

== Politics ==
Boe District is one of the districts and parliamentary constituencies of Nauru. It elects members to the Parliament of Nauru. The current members of parliament for the Boe constituency are Asterio Appi and Wanganeen Emiu for the 2025–2029 parliamentary term. Asterio Appi also serves as a cabinet minister in the government of Nauru.

== Notable people ==
- Baron D. Waqa, the former President of Nauru, is from Boe, having been elected from that constituency to serve in the Parliament of Nauru.
- Kinza Clodumar, former President of Nauru, is from Boe.
- The second Angam Baby, Bethel Enproe Adam, came from Boe.
- Weightlifter Tyoni Batsiua was from Boe.

== See also ==
- Geography of Nauru
- List of settlements in Nauru
