= Anetan district =

Anetan
- District
- Anetan District within Nauru
- Coordinates: 0°30′19″S 166°56′33″E
- Country: Nauru
- Constituency: Anetan

Area
  - Total: 1 km^{2} (0.39 sq mi)
- Elevation: 25 m (82 ft)

Population (2021)
  - Total: 795
- Time zone: (UTC+12)
- Area code: +674

Anetan is a district in the Pacific island nation of Nauru. It lies in Anetan Constituency.

== Geography ==
It is located in the north of the island and covers an area of 1.0 km^{2} (0.39 sq mi). It is one of the smallest districts. The population is about 880.

== Main sights ==
This district contains the weather station of the island.

== Education ==
Anetan Infant School is in Anetan. The primary and secondary schools serving all of Nauru are Yaren Primary School in Yaren District (years 1–3), Nauru Primary School in Meneng District (years 4–6), Nauru College in Denigomodu District (years 7–9), and Nauru Secondary School (years 10–12) in Yaren District.

== Notable people ==
- The former President of Nauru Marcus Stephen, who took office in 2007, is a member of the Parliament of Nauru representing the Anetan and Ewa constituency.

== See also ==
- List of settlements in Nauru
