= Nibok =

District in Nauru

- District
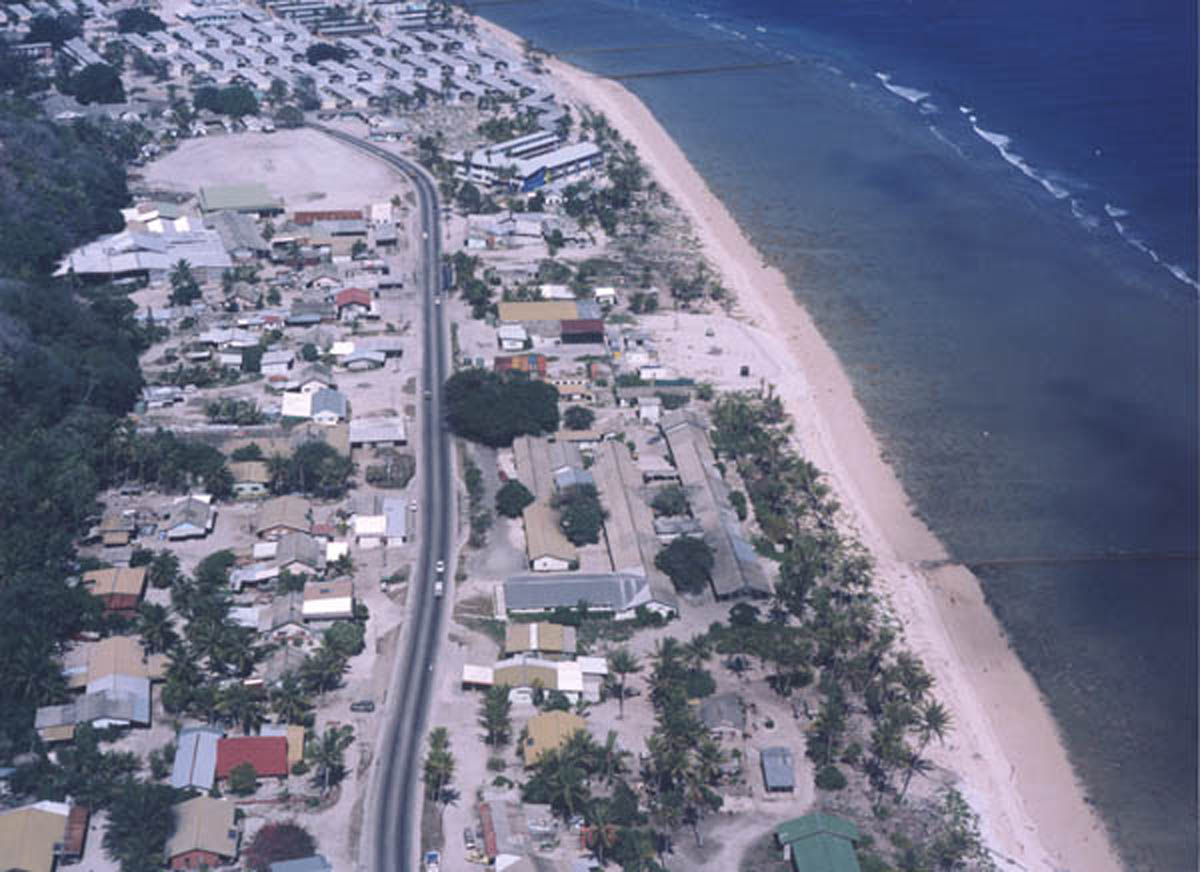
- View of Denigomodu and Nibok

- Nibok District within Nauru
- Coordinates: 0°31′2″S 166°55′15″E
- Country: Nauru
- Constituency: Ubenide

Area
  - Total: 1.6 km^{2} (0.62 sq mi)
- Elevation: 20 m (66 ft)

Population (2021)
  - Total: 724
- Time zone: (UTC+12)
- Area code: +674

Nibok is a district in the island nation of Nauru in the Micronesian South Pacific. It is located in the west of the island and covers an area of 1.6 square kilometres (395 acres). Nibok is a part of the Ubenide constituency. As of 2021, the population was 724.

The NPC field workshops are located in Nibok.

== Education ==
Nibok Infant School is in Nibok. The primary and secondary schools serving all of Nauru are Yaren Primary School in Yaren (years 1–3), Nauru Primary School in Meneng District (years 4–6), Nauru College in Denigomodu district (years 7–9), and Nauru Secondary School (years 10–12) in Yaren District.

== See also ==
- Geography of Nauru
- List of settlements in Nauru
- Rail transport in Nauru
