= Geography of Nauru =

Nauru
- Map of the island of Nauru

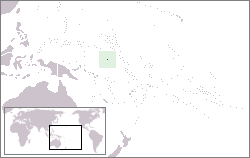

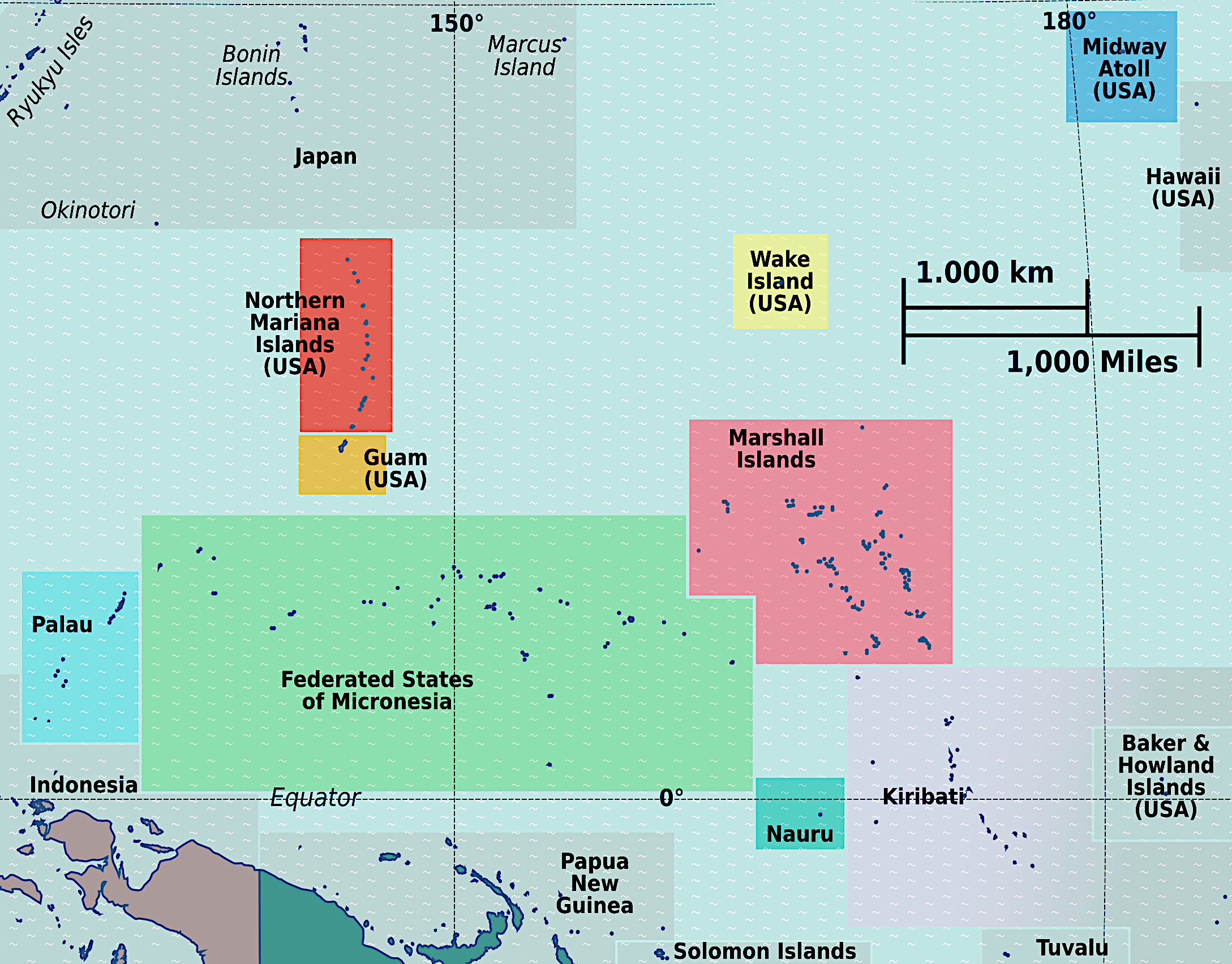
- Location within Micronesia Location within Oceania Location within Pacific Ocean

Geography
- Location: Pacific Ocean
- Coordinates: 0°32′S 166°55′E
- Area: 21 km^{2} (8.1 sq mi)
- Highest elevation: 65 m (213 ft)
- Highest point: Command Ridge

Administration
- Nauru
- Largest settlement: Denigomodu (pop. 1,800)

Demographics
- Population: 10,058 (2011)
- Pop. density: 441.67/km^{2} (1143.92/sq mi)
- Ethnic groups: Nauruan people

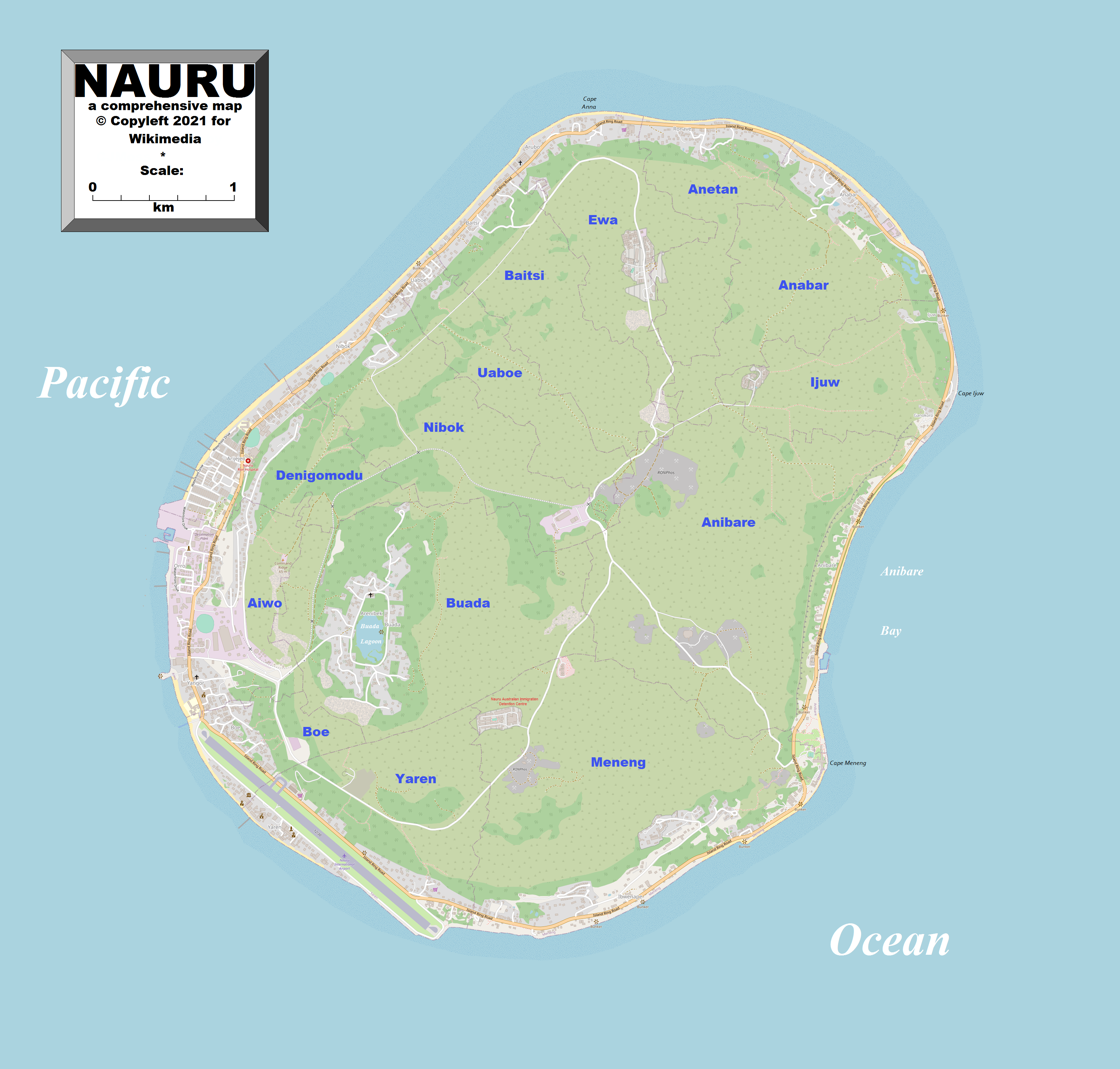
Enlargeable, detailed map of Nauru

Nauru (officially the Republic of Naoero) is a tiny phosphate rock island nation located in the South Pacific Ocean south of the Marshall Islands in Oceania. It is only 53 kilometres (33 mi) south of the Equator at coordinates 0°32′S 166°55′E. Nauru is one of the three great phosphate rock islands in the Pacific Ocean—the others are Banaba (Ocean Island) in Kiribati and Makatea in French Polynesia.

Its land area is 21 km^{2} (8.1 sq mi), and it has a 30-kilometre coastline (19 mi). Maritime claims are an Exclusive Economic Zone of 308,480 km^{2} (119,100 mi^{2}) with 200-nautical-miles (370 km), and a 12-nautical-mile (22 km) territorial sea.

The climate is tropical with a monsoon rainy season from November to February.

A sandy beach rises to the fertile ring around raised fringing coral reefs. The raised phosphate plateau ('Topside') takes up the central portion of the island. The highest point is 213 ft (65 m) above sea level, along the plateau rim.

Nauru's only economically significant natural resources are phosphates, formed from guano deposits by seabirds, and fisheries, particularly for tuna.

Due to being surrounded by corals and sandy beaches, the island houses no natural harbours, nor any rivers or substantial lakes.

Nauru has a unique navigational system, which is only capable of being used on the island.

== Geology of Nauru ==
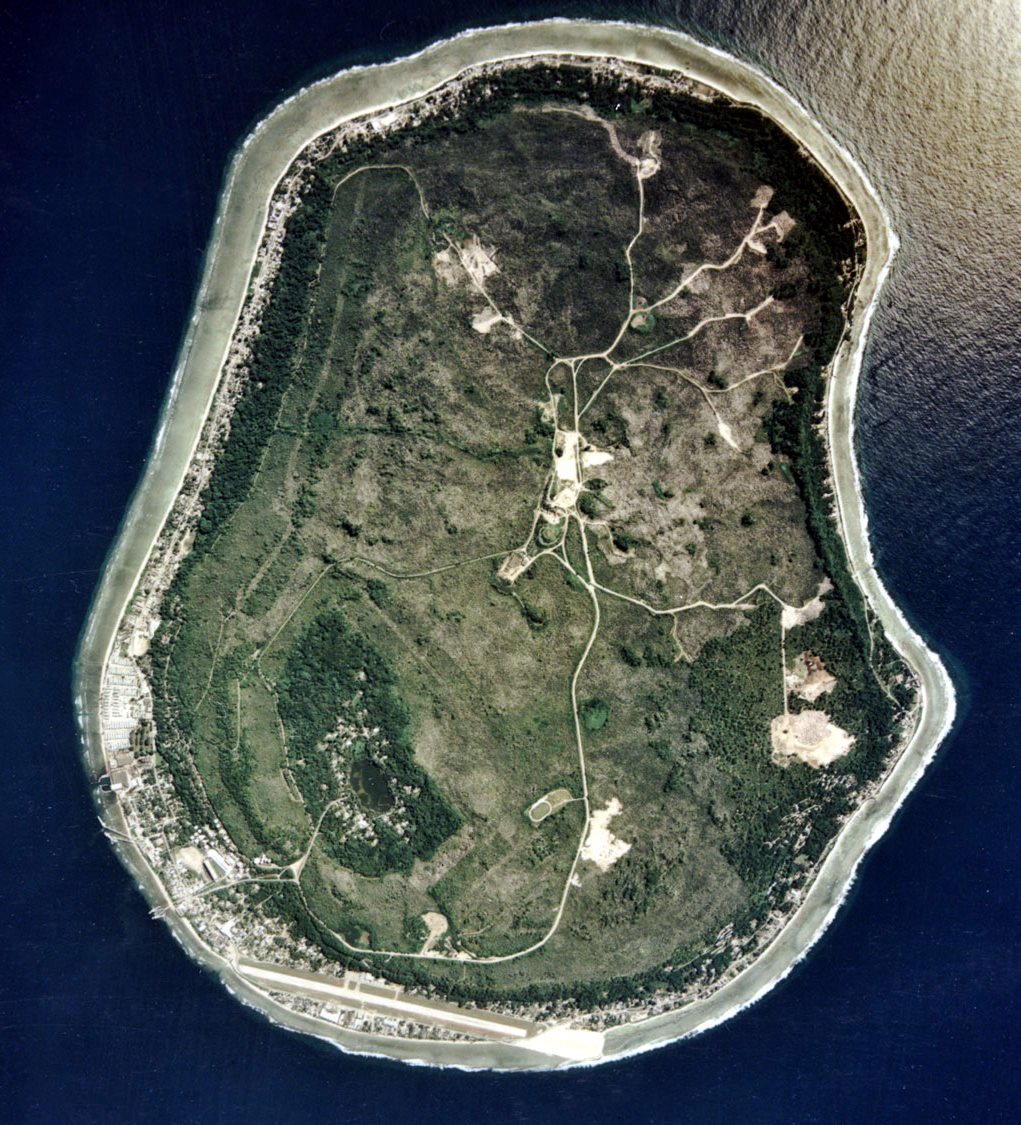
An aerial image of Nauru in 2002 from the U.S. Department of Energy's Atmospheric Radiation Measurement Program. Regenerated vegetation covers 63% of land that was mined.

Nauru is a raised coral atoll positioned in the Nauru Basin of the Pacific Ocean, on a part of the Pacific Plate that formed at a mid-oceanic ridge at 132 Ma. From mid-Eocene (35mya) to Oligocene times, a submarine volcano built up over a hotspot and formed a seamount composed of basalt. The seamount is over 4300 metres high. This hotspot was simultaneous with a major Pacific Plate reorganisation. The volcano was eroded to sea level and a coral atoll grew on top to a thickness of about 500 metres. Coral near the surface has been dated from 5 Mya to 0.3 Mya. The original limestone has been dolomitised by magnesium from seawater. The coral was raised above sea level about 30 metres and is now a dolomite limestone outcrop which was eroded in classic karst style into pinnacles up to 20 metres high. To at least a depth of 55 metres below sea level, the limestone has been dissolved forming cavities, sinkholes, and caves. Holes on the topside of the island were filled up by a phosphate layer up to several metres thick.

Anibare Bay was formed by the underwater collapse of the east side of the volcano. Buada Lagoon was formed by solution of the limestone when the sea level was lower, followed by collapse.

Nauru is moving at 104 mm (4.1 in) per year to the northwest along with the Pacific Plate.

Freshwater can be found in Buada lagoon, and also in some brackish ponds at the escarpment base in Ijuw and Anabar in the northeast. There is an underground lake in Moqua Cave in the southeast of the island. Since there are no streams or rivers on Nauru, water must be gathered from roof catchment systems. Water is also brought to Nauru as ballast on ships returning for loads of phosphate.

== Environmental issues ==
- Periodic droughts, limited natural freshwater resources (roof storage tanks collect rainwater, but mostly dependent on a single, aging desalination plant)
- Extreme soil conditions are caused by high alkalinity, high phosphate levels, and low potassium. Iron, manganese, copper, molybdenum, and zinc are rendered unavailable to plants. Combined with thin or damaged soils this causes low fertility.
- Intensive phosphate mining during the past 90 years has left the central 80% of Nauru a wasteland and threatens limited remaining land resources.

Nauru is a party to the international environmental agreements on biodiversity, climate change, desertification, the law of the sea and marine dumping.

== Climate ==
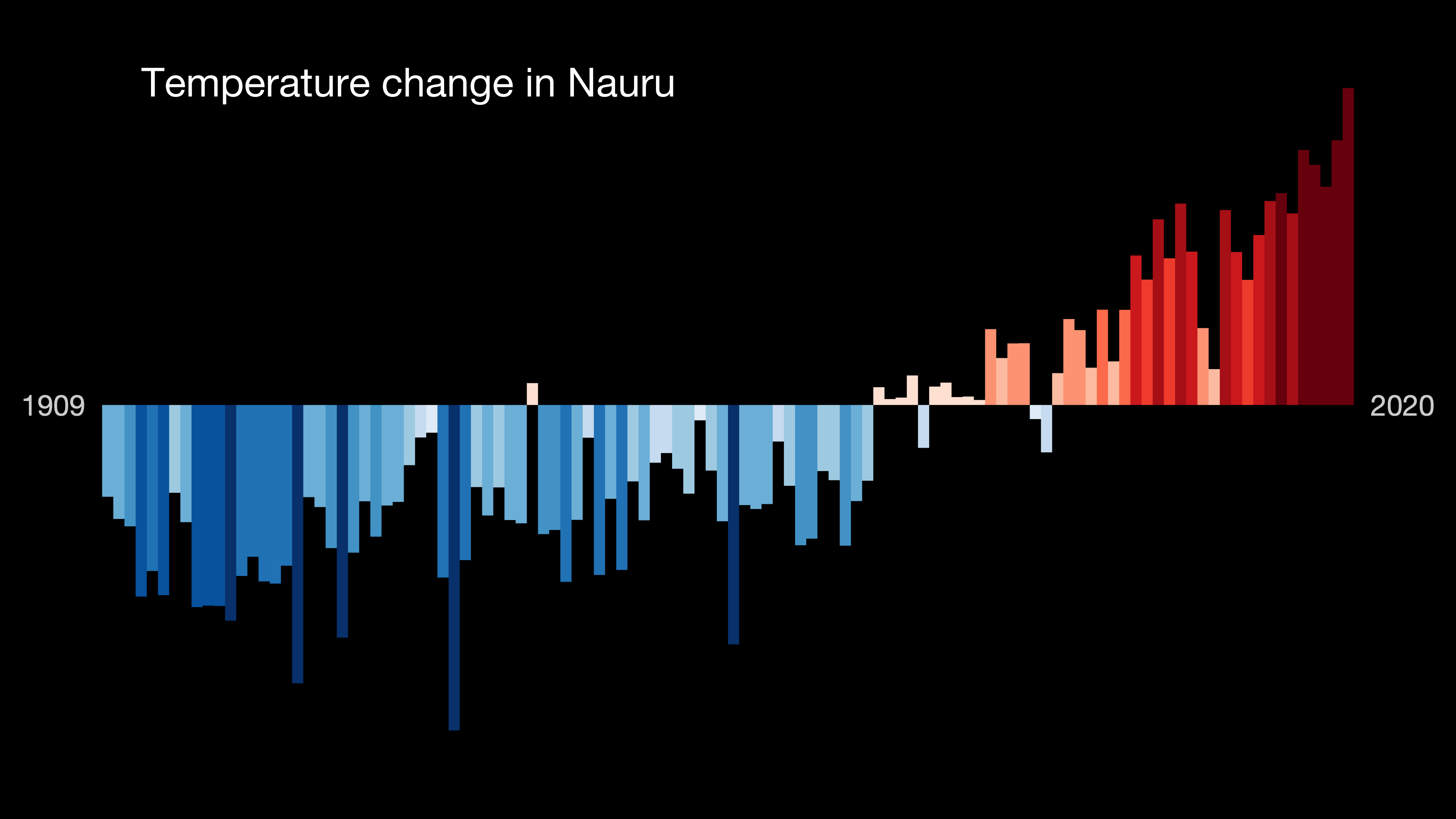
Temperature change in Nauru since 1909 in the context of global warming

Nauru's climate is hot and very humid year-round because of its proximity to the equator and the ocean. Nauru is hit by monsoon rains between November and February, but rarely has cyclones. Annual rainfall is highly variable and is influenced by the El Niño–Southern Oscillation, with several significant recorded droughts. The temperature on Nauru ranges between 30 and 35 °C (86 and 95 °F) during the day and is quite stable at around 25 °C (77 °F) at night.

Climate data for Yaren District, Nauru
Month	Jan	Feb	Mar	Apr	May	Jun	Jul	Aug	Sep	Oct	Nov	Dec	Year
Record high °C (°F)	34 (93)	37 (99)	35 (95)	35 (95)	32 (90)	32 (90)	35 (95)	33 (91)	35 (95)	34 (93)	36 (97)	35 (95)	37 (99)
Mean daily maximum °C (°F)	30 (86)	30 (86)	30 (86)	30 (86)	30 (86)	30 (86)	30 (86)	30 (86)	30 (86)	31 (88)	31 (88)	31 (88)	30 (87)
Mean daily minimum °C (°F)	25 (77)	25 (77)	25 (77)	25 (77)	25 (77)	25 (77)	25 (77)	25 (77)	25 (77)	25 (77)	25 (77)	25 (77)	25 (77)
Record low °C (°F)	21 (70)	21 (70)	21 (70)	21 (70)	20 (68)	21 (70)	20 (68)	21 (70)	20 (68)	21 (70)	21 (70)	21 (70)	20 (68)
Average precipitation mm (inches)	280 (11.0)	250 (9.8)	190 (7.5)	190 (7.5)	120 (4.7)	110 (4.3)	150 (5.9)	130 (5.1)	120 (4.7)	100 (3.9)	120 (4.7)	280 (11.0)	2,080 (81.9)
Average precipitation days	16	14	13	11	9	9	12	14	11	10	13	15	152
Source: Weatherbase

== Extreme points ==
This is a list of the extreme points of Nauru, the points that are farther north, south, east or west or higher than any other location.

- Northernmost point – Cape Anna, Ewa District.
- Easternmost point – Cape Ijuw, Ijuw District.
- Southernmost point – unnamed headland south of the wireless station, Meneng District.
- Westernmost point – the harbour, Aiwo District.
- Highest point – Command Ridge (65 m, 213 ft).
- Lowest point – Pacific Ocean (sea level).

== See also ==
- List of settlements in Nauru
