= Anetan =

Anetan may refer to:

- Anetan District
- Anetan Constituency
