= Tyoni Batsiua =

Nauruan weightlifter (1981–2004)

Personal information
- Born: October 14, 1981 Boe District, Nauru
- Died: January 31 or February 1, 2004 (aged 22) Denigomodu District, Nauru
- Occupation: Weightlifter
- Years active: 1997–2004
- Weight: 52.81 kg (116 lb) (1996)

Tyoni Batsiua (October 14, 1981 – 2004) was a Nauruan weightlifter. She won the Oceania Weightlifting Championships several times and earned six gold medals at the South Pacific Games. She went on to compete in the World Weightlifting Championships and the 2002 Commonwealth Games. Her career was cut short in 2004 by her sudden death at age 22.

== Biography ==
Tyoni Batsiua was born in Nauru's Boe District in 1981. She was a member of the Eamwit Tribe.

Her first weightlifting success came as a teenager at the 1997 South Pacific Mini Games in Pago Pago. Two years later, she competed in the 1999 South Pacific Games in Guam, taking home three gold medals. She won another three at the 2003 South Pacific Games in Fiji. She also competed at the 1998 World Weightlifting Championships in Finland and the 2002 Commonwealth Games.

In 2004, she planned to compete in the Summer Olympics in Athens, but late that January, she suffered serious injuries in a car accident. She died a few days later, on January 31 or February 1, 2004, at a hospital in Denigomodu District. She left one daughter, named Oceana. At the time of her death she held the junior and senior records in Oceania for the 58 kg class. The Tyoni Batsiua Memorial Cup was established in Nauru in her honor.
