= Ewa, Nauru =

Ewa
- District
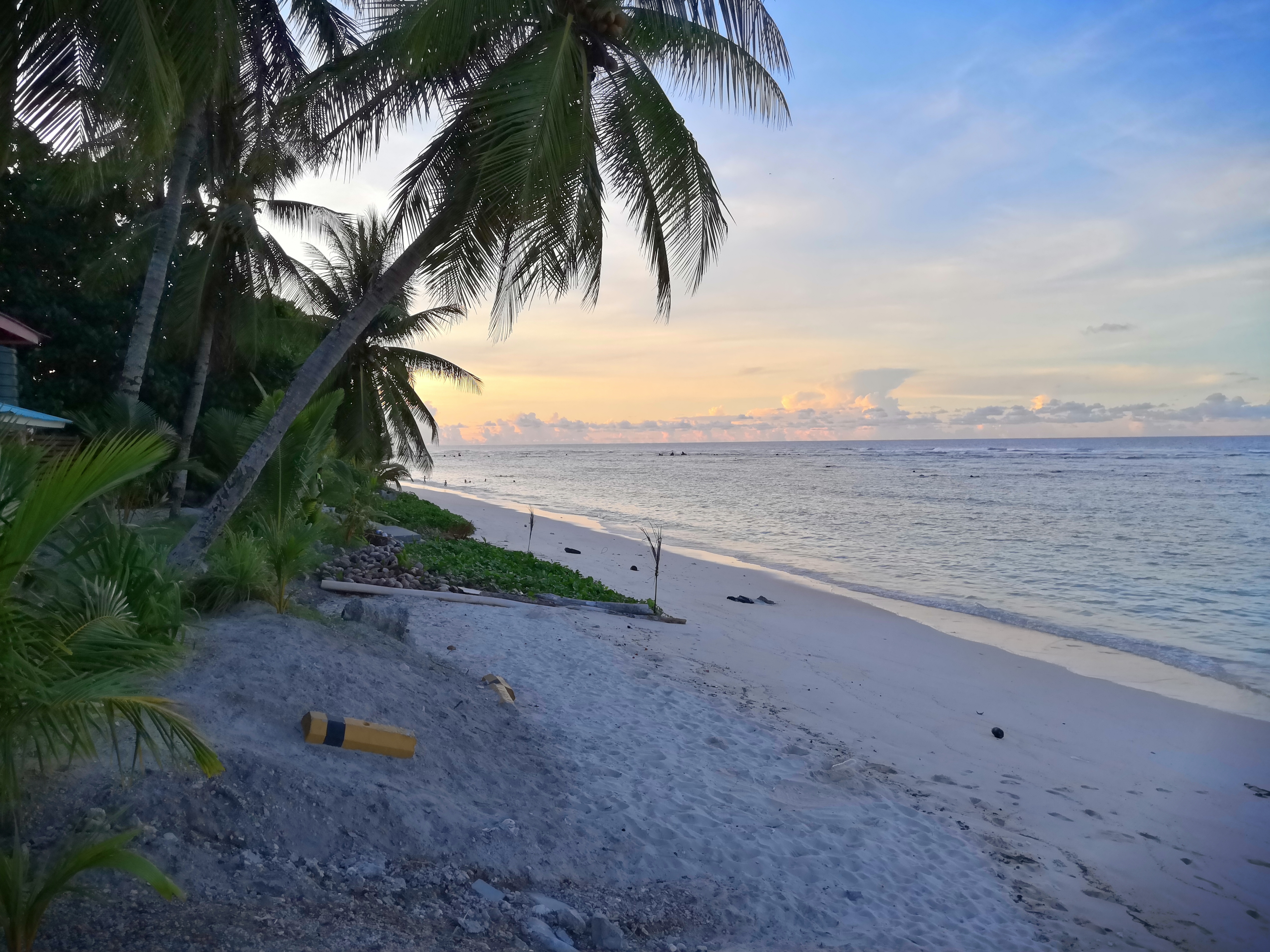
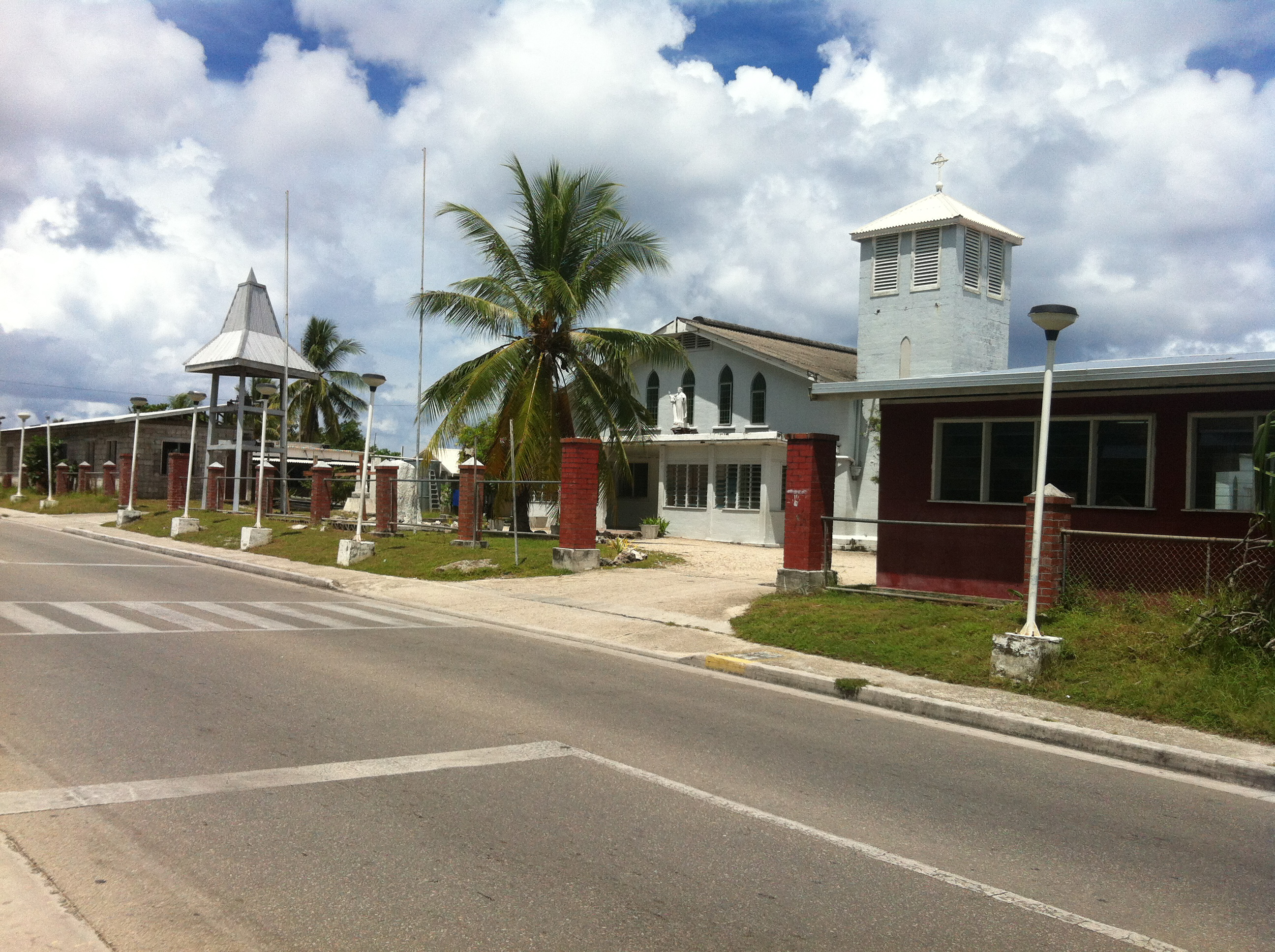
- Ewa Beach Catholic Church of Christ the King

- Ewa District within Nauru
- Coordinates: 0°30′17″S 166°56′8″E
- Country: Nauru
- Constituency: Anetan

Area
  - Total: 1.2 km^{2} (0.46 sq mi)
- Elevation: 25 m (82 ft)

Population (2021)
  - Total: 537
- Time zone: (UTC+12)
- Area code: +674

Ewa is a district in the Pacific nation of the Republic of Nauru, located in the north of island.

== Geography ==
It covers an area of 1.2 km^{2} and has a population of 537. Ewa is part of the Anetan constituency.

The northernmost point of Nauru is in the Ewa District.

== Buildings and structures ==
- Kayser College - A K-10 school. Named after German missionary Alois Kayser, who lived on the island for forty years.
- Capelle & Partner - a department store that is the largest business in Nauru.
- An Australian rules football playing ground is to the east of Capelle & Partner; it is a bare patch of crushed coral.
- Christ the King Church is located in the town of Arubo.

== Education ==
The primary and secondary schools serving all of Nauru are Yaren Primary School in Yaren (years 1-3), Nauru Primary School in Meneng District (years 4-6), Nauru College in Denigomodu district (years 7-9), and Nauru Secondary School (years 10-12).

There is a private Catholic school, Kayser College, in Ewa. It serves infant years-year 8; and it served years 1-11 as of April 2002. A new three classroom building opened on 8 May 2015. As of 2002 the Nauru Department of Education gives the school 80% of its funds.

== Notable people ==
- Marcus Stephen, appointed President of Nauru in 2007

== See also ==
- Geography of Nauru
- List of settlements in Nauru
