= Constituencies of Nauru =

Electoral districts of Nauru

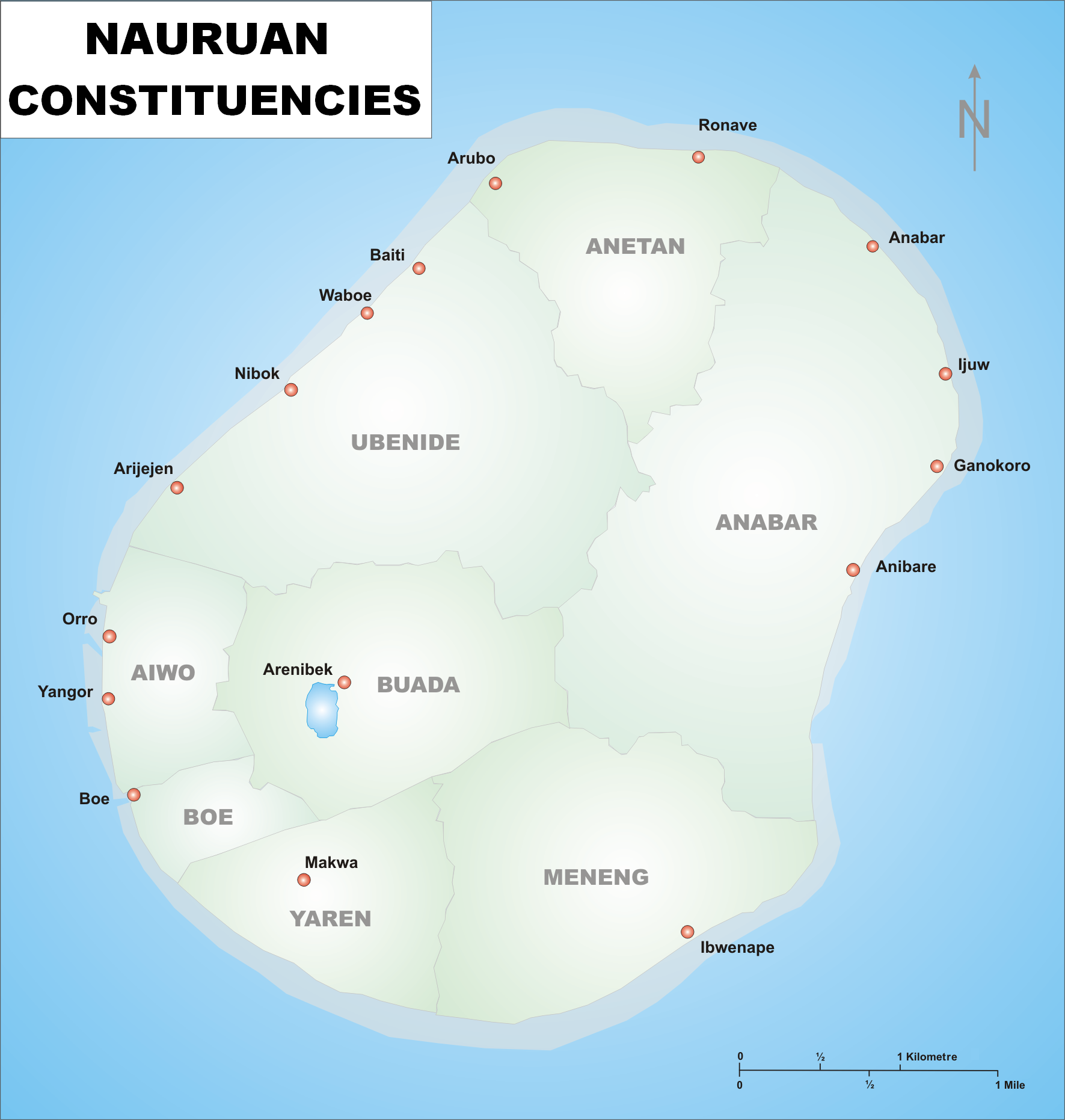
Map of the Nauruan constituencies

Nauru has 8 constituencies, and each of them includes one or more districts. Ubenide sends 4 members to the Parliament of Nauru and Meneng sends 3; the others all send 2.

== List ==
Constituency	District(s)	Members	Area (km^{2})	Pop. (2011)	Dens. (2011 in km^{2})	Map
Aiwo	1 (Aiwo)	2	1.1	1,220	1,109.1	
Anabar	3 (Anabar, Anibare, Ijuw)	2	5.1	1,240	243.1	
Anetan	2 (Anetan, Ewa)	2	2.2	1,180	536.4	
Boe	1 (Boe)	2	0.5	851	1,702	
Buada	1 (Buada)	2	2.6	739	284.2	
Meneng	1 (Meneng)	3	3.1	1,380	445.2	
Ubenide	4 (Baitsi, Denigomodu, Nibok, Uaboe)	4	4.5	3,300	733.3	
Yaren	1 (Yaren)	2	1.5	747	498	
Total	–	19	21.3	11,424	536.3	–

== See also ==
- Districts of Nauru
