= List of settlements in Nauru =

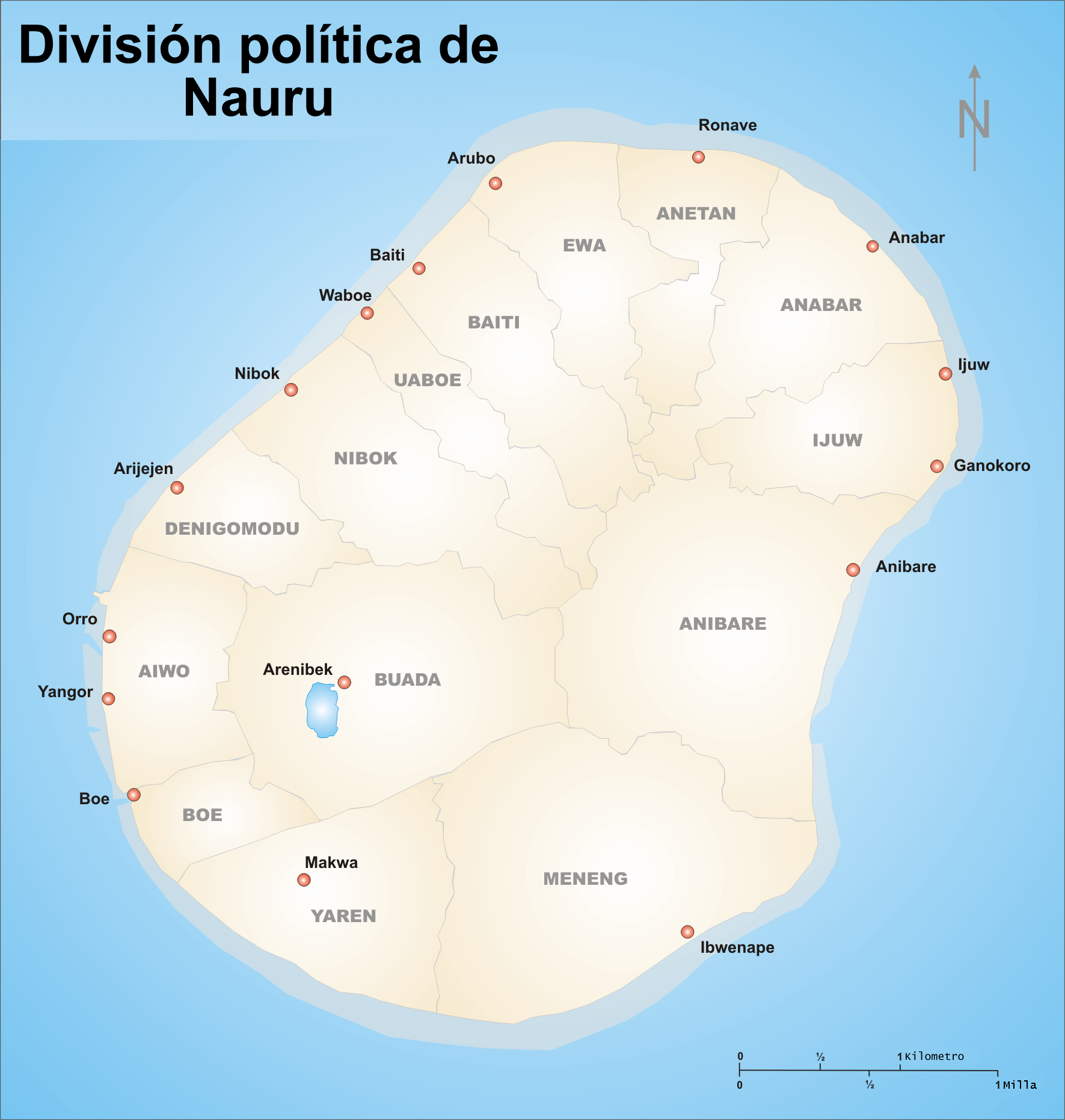
A map of Nauru showing districts, and the current main villages

Nauru's location

Nauru, officially the Republic of Naoero, originally consisted of 169 villages; by 1900 these were already partly abandoned, uninhabited or destroyed. With the increasing population growth the single villages merged into a single connected settlement, which today is spread out around the entire coastal strip.

The village names are from the book Nauru - Ergebnisse der Südseeexpedition by Paul Hambruch, who researched on the island during the Hamburger Südsee-Expedition 1908–1910. The village names were changed following the orthographic reform of the Nauruan language of 1939.

Nauru - Ergebnisse der Südseeexpedition, Vol. 1, p. 59 – 62

== List ==
Name of village	District
Abab	Ewa
Abwan	Buada
Adibor	Anabar
Aduongeow	Ijuw
Arei	Anibare
Adrurior	Baitsi
Adungidungur	Buada
Aeibur	Anabar
Aeonun	Baitsi
Agabwe	Anibare
Aiburi	Ewa
Aioe	Denigomodu
Aiwo	Aiwo
Amet	Uaboe
Anabar	Anibare
Aneboredi	Meneng
Anakawida	Baitsi
Anakawidua	Anibare
Anakawiduwa	Nibok
Anakawiduwo	Buada
Anamongerin	Boe
Anapodu	Denigomodu
Anatiw	Denigomodu
Anaoe	Meneng
Anebenok	Ijuw
Anebweyan	Anetan
Anera	Anibare
Anerue	Denigomodu
Angowang	Nibok
Anibawo	Denigomodu
Anigobwi	Yaren
Anitobu	Anibare
Aniwen	Meneng
Anna	Ewa
Anoreo	Buada
Anut	Baitsi
Anuwuroiya	Anetan
Anuer	Ewa
Ara	Buada
Araitsi	Meneng
Aramen	Ewa
Raro	Anabar
Areb	Anabar
Arenibok	Buada
Aribimomo	Meneng
Aribaeang	Anibare
Aribweabwe	Aiwo
Ariyeyen	Denigomodu
Aromwemwe	Buada
Aro	Ijuw
Arubo	Ewa
Aruango	Meneng
Atabwagabap	Meneng
Atae	Meneng
Ataneu	Baitsi
Ataro	Meneng
Ate	Anibare
Atebar	Anabar
Atedi	Anetan
Atibuyinor	Anabar
Aterabu	Baitsi
Atomo	Yaren
Atowedudu	Meneng
Atowong	Anabar
Atsiyeiubar	Meneng
Atubwinumar	Boe
Atumurumur	Denigomodu
Autibwire	Ewa
Awidayungiyung	Meneng
Badi	Meneng
Bagabap	Meneng
Bogetorior	Anabar
Baitsi	Baitsi
Bangabanga	Buada
Biteiye	Boe
Bodeadi	Anabar
Bogemaruw	Ijuw
Bogi	Buada
Boneida	Anibare
Boreboren	Ewa
Bowagae	Denigomodu
Butemangum	Denigomodu
Bwaterangerang	Denigomodu
Bweranibek	Anibare
Bwerigi	Denigomodu
Bweteboe	Anibare
Bweteoaru	Anibare
Bwidin	Uaboe
Daubugingarawa	Nibok
Deradae	Baitsi
Eanauwirieria	Buada
Eatabuarik	Ijuw
Eatamebure	Ijuw
Eatebibito	Anetan
Eatedeta	Anetan
Eatedogi	Anibare
Eateduna	Anetan
Eategoba	Buada
Eateneno	Denigomodu
Eateragabe	Nibok
Eaterienago	Aiwo
Eaterieri	Anabar
Eatibwer	Ijuw
Eatoborowada	Aiwo
Eatobwadae	Nibok
Edet	Nibok
Edet	Uaboe
Etabae	Nibok
Etamor	Anibare
Etur	Ijuw
Era	Meneng
Ewa	Ewa
Gabab	Aiwo
Ganoko	Nibok
Ganokoro	Ijuw
Gane	Anibare
Gareow	Boe
Kawinanut	Anibare
Kibaba	Yaren
Mangadab	Baitsi
Marerauwa	Ewa
Medang	Ewa
Mediteru	Anetan
Mererauwa	Anetan
Mereren	Baitsi
Merubo	Anibare
Meure	Yaren
Miage	Nibok
Mwea	Anetan
Mweoen	Uaboe
Ngengan	Anetan
Oreb	Buada
Orro	Aiwo
Redeta	Buada
Ronawi	Anetan
Ueba	Denigomodu
Tarawoa	Denigomodu
Tabata	Aiwo
Tieniben	Ijuw
Tsigamei	Aiwo
Uaboe	Uaboe
Ubweno	Buada
Umaruru	Baitsi
Urigomagom	Ijuw
Ouebouebin	Buada
Wengom	Nibok
Ueo	Meneng
Oereda	Anabar
Yangor	Denigomodu
Yanmwitebwiyeye	Anibare
Yaranemat	Denigomodu
Yaren	Yaren
Yatabang	Baitsi
Yaterangija	Anabar
Yeduen	Nibok
Yoe	Ewa
Ijongin	Yaren
Yongareb	Ewa
Ijuwinengin	Anabar

== See also ==
- Geography of Nauru
