= Olympia Zacharias =

Nauruan runner (born 1986)

- Born: 17 January 1986 (age 40); Denigomodu
- Spouse: Winston Harris

Olympia Zacharias (born 17 January 1986) is a Nauruan runner who competed at the 2003 World Championships in Athletics. She was her country's only athlete at that event in Paris. Her best distance is 100 m and her record in 2003 was 14.07 seconds with her personal best time being 13.17 seconds. In 2003, she was elected to lead the Nauru Athletics Association for three years.

In 2011, she became engaged to Winston Harris. They married on 1 July 2011 at Nauru Independent Church.
