= Uaboe =

- District
- Uaboe District within Nauru
- Coordinates: 0°31′0″S 166°55′0″E
- Country: Nauru
- Constituency: Ubenide

Area
  - Total: 0.8 km^{2} (0.31 sq mi)
- Elevation: 20 m (66 ft)

Population (2021)
  - Total: 341
- Time zone: (UTC+12)
- Area code: +674

Uaboe (also known as Waboe) is a district in the island nation of Nauru, located in the northwest of the island.

== Geography ==
Covering about 0.8 km^{2}, Uaboe has a population of 341. Uaboe is the second-smallest district in Nauru. It is the only district other than Boe to have an area less than 1.0 km^{2}. The Nauru Local Government Council lands office is located in Uaboe, and the district is a part of the Ubenide Constituency. Uaboe is also the highest settlement in Nauru.

== Notable people ==
- Timothy Detudamo, linguist and governor of Nauru, was from Uaboe.

== See also ==
- List of settlements in Nauru
- Rail transport in Nauru
