= Baitsi =

- District
- Baitsi District within Nauru
- Coordinates: 0°30′25″S 166°55′54″E
- Country: Nauru
- Constituency: Ubenide

Area
  - Total: 1.2 km^{2} (0.46 sq mi)
- Elevation: 25 m (82 ft)

Population (2021)
  - Total: 523
  - Density: 440/km^{2} (1,100/sq mi)
- Time zone: (UTC+12)
- Area code: +674

Baitsi, formerly known as Baiti and previously as Beidi, is a district in the Pacific island nation of Nauru. It belongs to Ubenide constituency.

== Geography ==
=== Location ===
The district is located in the northwest of the island. It covers an area of 1.2 km^{2}, 5.7% of country's area.

=== Former villages ===
- Adrurior
- Aeonun
- Anakawida
- Anut
- Ataneu
- Atirabu
- Baitsi (village)
- Deradae
- Ibedwe
- Imangengen
- Imaraga
- Mangadab
- Mereren
- Umaruru
- Yatabang

== See also ==
- Geography of Nauru
- List of settlements in Nauru
