= Moqua Well =

Underground lake in Nauru

- Location of Moqua Well in Nauru
- Location: Yaren
- Coordinates: 0.5466°S 166.920°E
- Type: underground lake
- Basin countries: Nauru
- Surface area: 2,000 m^{2} (0.49 acres)
- Average depth: 2.5 m (8 ft 2 in)
- Max. depth: 5 m (16 ft)
- Surface elevation: 5 m (16 ft)

The Moqua Well is a small underground lake in Yaren, Nauru.

== History ==
During World War II, the Moqua Well was the primary source of drinking water for inhabitants of Nauru. It is for this reason that the body of water is referred to as a well instead of a lake.

In 2001, Nauruan authorities decided to put up a fence to prevent accidents, after an alcohol-related drowning in the same year.

== Location ==
The well is located below the Yaren. The Moqua Well is not well known, one of few Tourist attractions in Nauru. Nearby are the Moqua Caves, a series of caves below Yaren.

=== Linguistic disambiguation ===
The name of the well 'Moqua' (sometimes referred to as 'Makwa') is derived from the former name by which Yaren was known.

== See also ==
- Yaren district#Main sights
- Nauru
- Hydrography
