= Rail transport in Nauru =

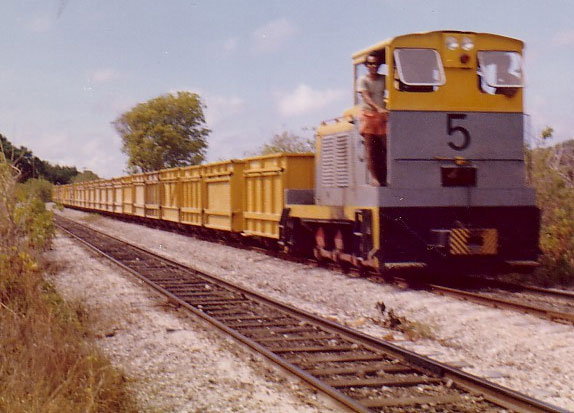
A phosphate train in Nauru

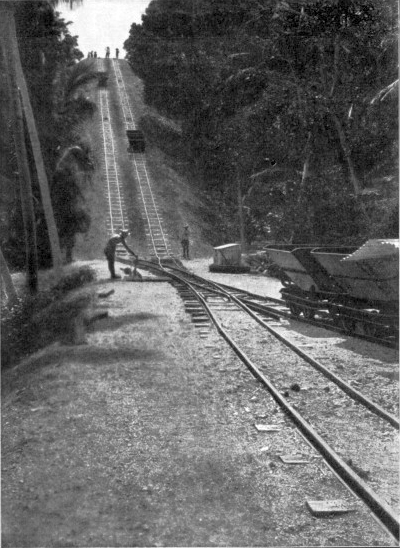
The phosphate railway in 1908

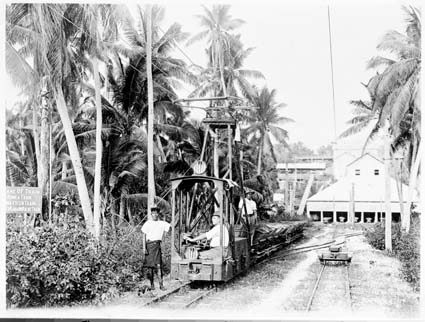
Nauru railway in 1917

In Nauru, rail transport was used for moving calcium pyrophosphate from the island's interior to the cantilever jetties on the island's western coast. For this purpose, a 3.9 km (2.4 mi) long, 610 mm (2 ft) gauge was built by the Pacific Phosphate Company in 1907. The line passed through the districts of Aiwo, Buada, Denigomodu, Nibok, Uaboe and Anibare.

== History ==
A map of Nauru showing the railway (the dotted black line)

The railway at Aiwo jetty was electrified in 1912, but replaced by a conveyor belt between the storage bins and the jetty head.

The gauge was upgraded to 914 mm (3 ft) by the British Phosphate Commission in 1920. In the past, steam engines were used to power the trains, later worked by diesel engines, though occasionally, a tractor was used.

The railway was still operational as of 2008, although operations are believed to have ceased after 2011. In March 2025, Nauru officials met with the Indian railway contractor Unirail to discuss 'cost-effective' methods of phosphate transportation, including the potential restoration of Nauru's railway system.

Nauru's phosphate trains were featured on several Nauru stamps, including a series from 1980 (Yvert no. 211-213) and another one from 1985 (Yvert no. 306, Scott no. 308).

== See also ==
- Transport in Nauru
- Nauru Phosphate Corporation
