= Anabar district =

Anabar
- District
- Anabar District within Nauru
- Coordinates: 0°31′0″S 166°57′0″E
- Country: Nauru
- Constituency: Anabar

Area
  - Total: 1.5 km^{2} (0.58 sq mi)
- Elevation: 25 m (82 ft)

Population (2021)
  - Total: 565
- Time zone: (UTC+12)
- Area code: +674

Anabar is a district in the Pacific country of Nauru.

== Geography ==
It is part of the Anabar constituency. It is located in the northeast of the island, covers an area of 1.5 km^{2} and has a population of 565 (2021).

== History ==
Anabar, along with neighbouring district of Ijuw, is believed to be the 3rd area to submerged after Buada first and Anibare second about 3000+ years ago.

Its first inhabitants are Deiboe clans people, led by Deianoang, who fled to save his family of three daughters, from the raging war of Atemor's open field between Eamwit clansmen off Anuquoge village and his clan, the Deiboe people from Ganokoro.

Irutsi clan was born amongst the rocky regions of Abodeatsi where three men slaves and two slave women met during a month-long hide amidst the rocky region, who five slave people later intermarried each other to expand the population along the rocky regions of Anabar.

Anabar's pond 'Tibinor' was the deepest pond on the island. Such legends like the ones of 'Amwieob' originated in Anabar.

Like Buada, Anabar had its own dialect, a way of speaking which the natives refer to as the "Kin'nir", nothing similar to the "E'koro" language in the Arenibok village.

== Notable people ==
- Ludwig Scotty, (born 1948 - died 2026) President of Nauru in 2003, and again from 2004 to 2007, represented Anabar in Parliament of Nauru.

== See also ==
- List of settlements in Nauru
