= Australian High Commission =

Australian High Commission may refer to:

- High Commission of Australia, London
- List of high commissioners of Australia to Canada
- List of high commissioners of Australia to New Zealand
- List of high commissioners of Australia to the United Kingdom
