= Aiwo =

- district
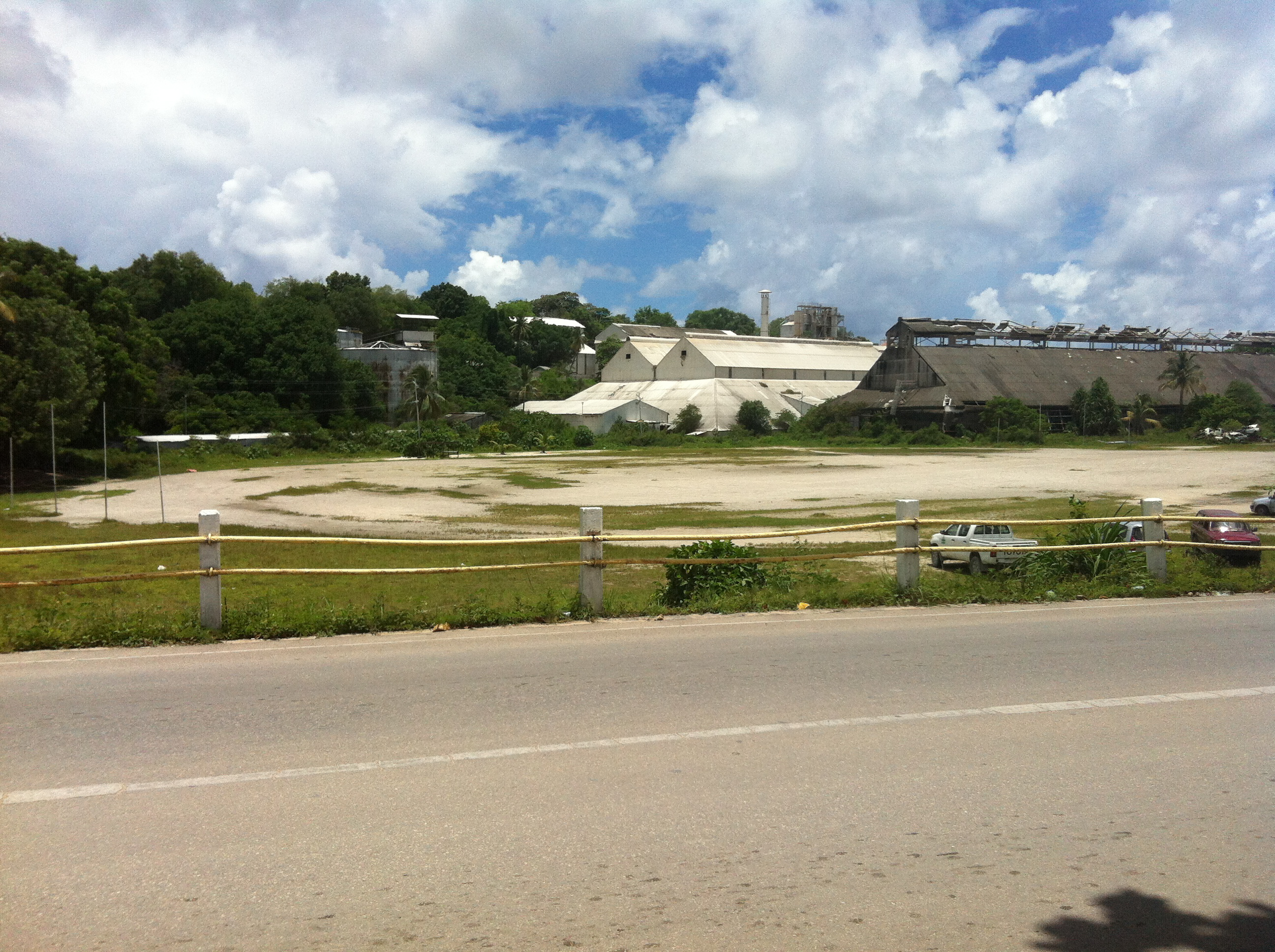
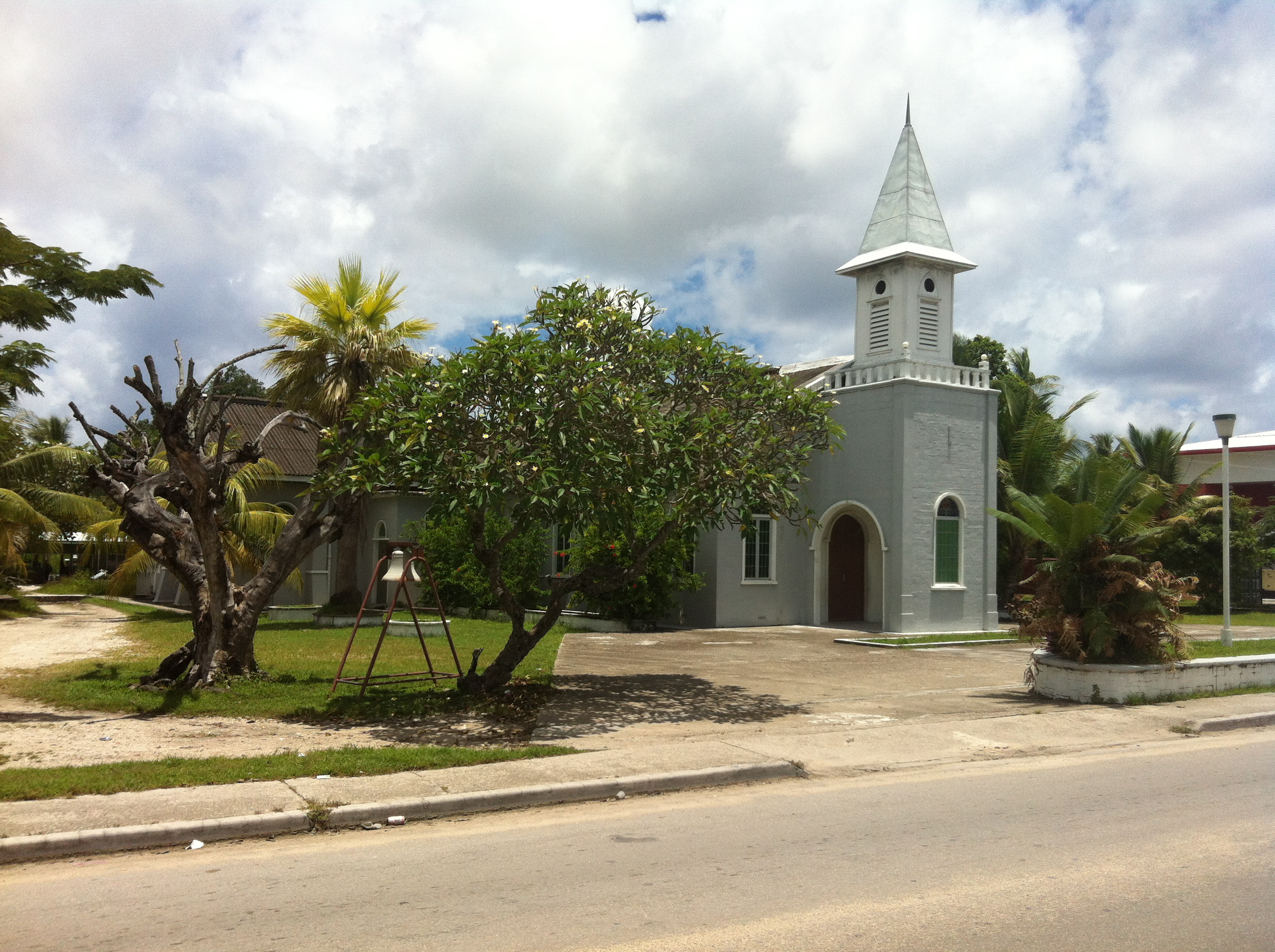
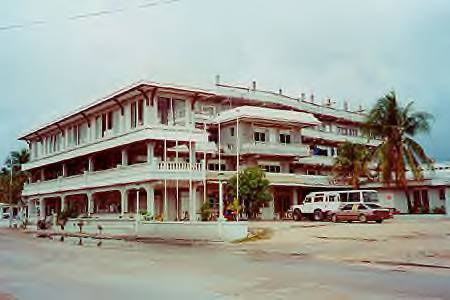
- Linkbelt Oval Nauru Congregational Church OD-N-Aiwo Hotel

- Aiwo District within Nauru
- Coordinates: 0°31′48″S 166°54′42″E
- Country: Nauru
- constituency: Aiwo

Area
  - Total: 1.1 km^{2} (0.42 sq mi)
- Elevation: 26 m (85 ft)

Population (2021)
  - Total: 1,258
- Time zone: (UTC+12)
- Area code: +674

Aiwo (rarely Aiue, in earlier times Yangor) is a district in the Pacific island country of Nauru. It belongs to Aiwo constituency.

== Geography ==
It is located in the west of the island. It covers an area of 1.1 square kilometres (0.42 sq mi) and has a population of 1,258. It is sometimes called the unofficial capital city of Nauru; Nauru does not have an official capital city, and it is more common for Yaren to be cited as such.

== Local features ==
The majority of the Nauruan industry is located in Aiwo. Among the facilities in Aiwo are:

- The Aiue Boulevard
- Nauru International Port
- The Chinatown of Nauru
- The OD-N-Aiwo Hotel, one of two hotels in Nauru. Privately owned, it is also the tallest building in Nauru
- The Linkbelt Oval sports stadium
- The powerhouse
- Formerly, the Nauru campus of the University of the South Pacific (moved to Yaren in 2018)
- The Nauru Local Government Council chambers and offices
- The Nauru Phosphate Corporation processing facilities and cantilever

The district returns two members to the Parliament of Nauru in Yaren.

The Australian High Commission to Nauru is also in Aiwo District.

== Education ==
The primary and secondary schools serving all of Nauru are Yaren Primary School in Yaren (years 1-3), Nauru Primary School in Meneng district (years 4-6), Nauru College in Denigomodu district (years 7-9), and Nauru Secondary School (years 10-12) in Yaren.

Aiwo Primary School previously operated in Aiwo. As of April 2002 it served students from all parts of Nauru in years 3 and 4.

University of the South Pacific Nauru Campus was previously in Aiwo; it moved to Yaren District in 2018.

== Notable people ==
The first speaker of the Nauruan parliament, Rev. Itubwa Amram, represented Aiwo. Following Amram, Kinza Clodumar represented the district. René Harris, who served a number of terms as President of Nauru, represented Aiwo in Parliament for many years.

== See also ==
- OD-N-Aiwo Hotel
- Rail transport in Nauru
- List of settlements in Nauru
