= Yaren =

District and de facto capital of Nauru

- District
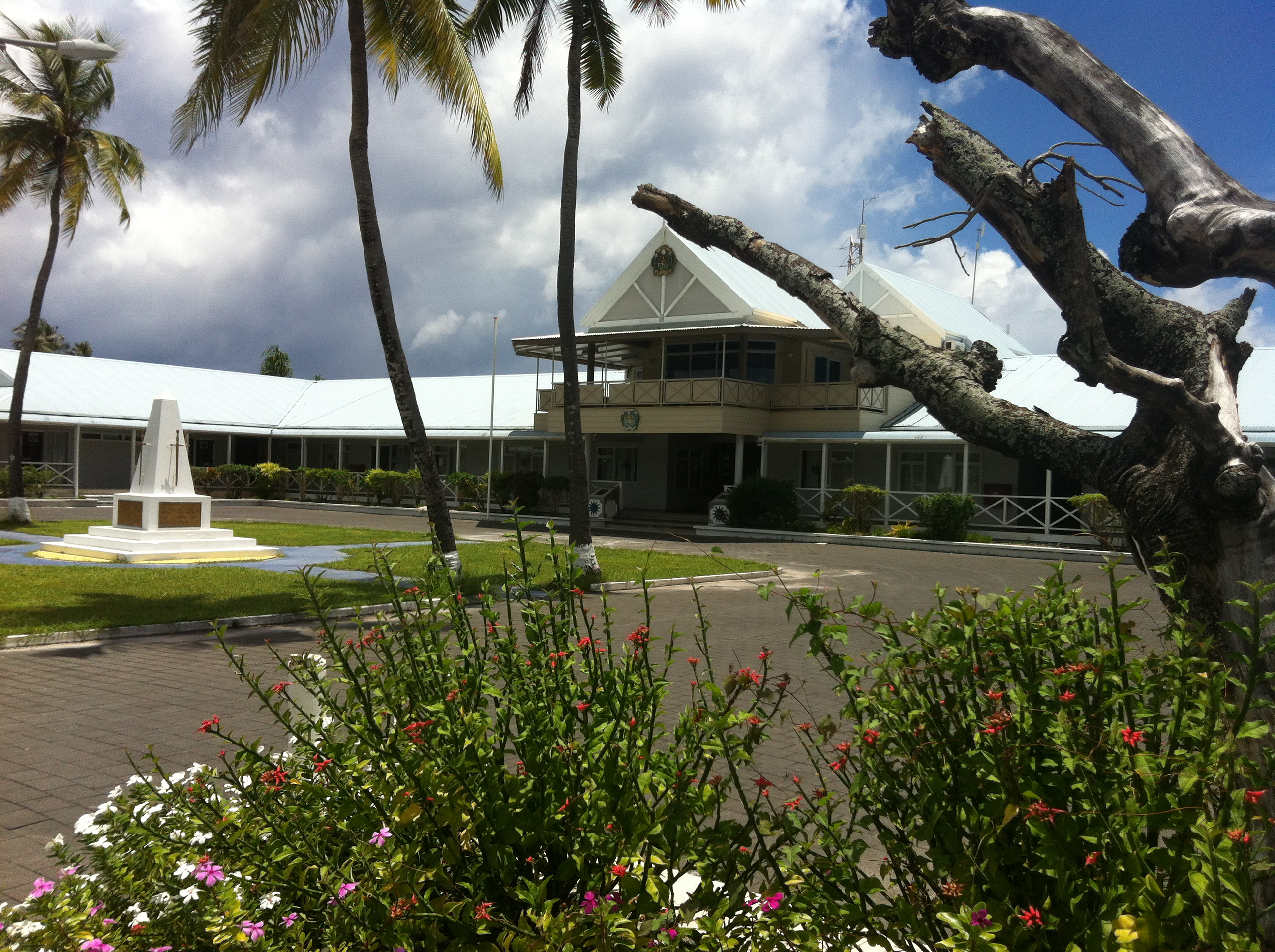
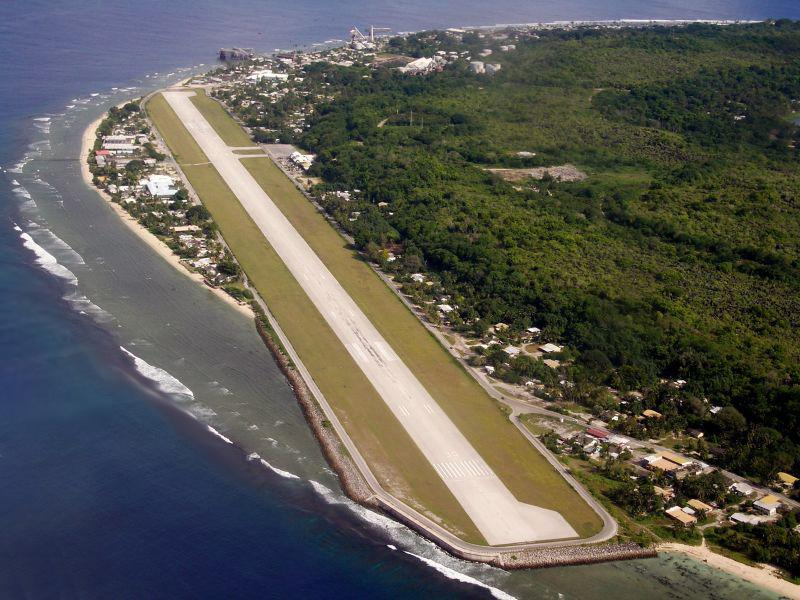
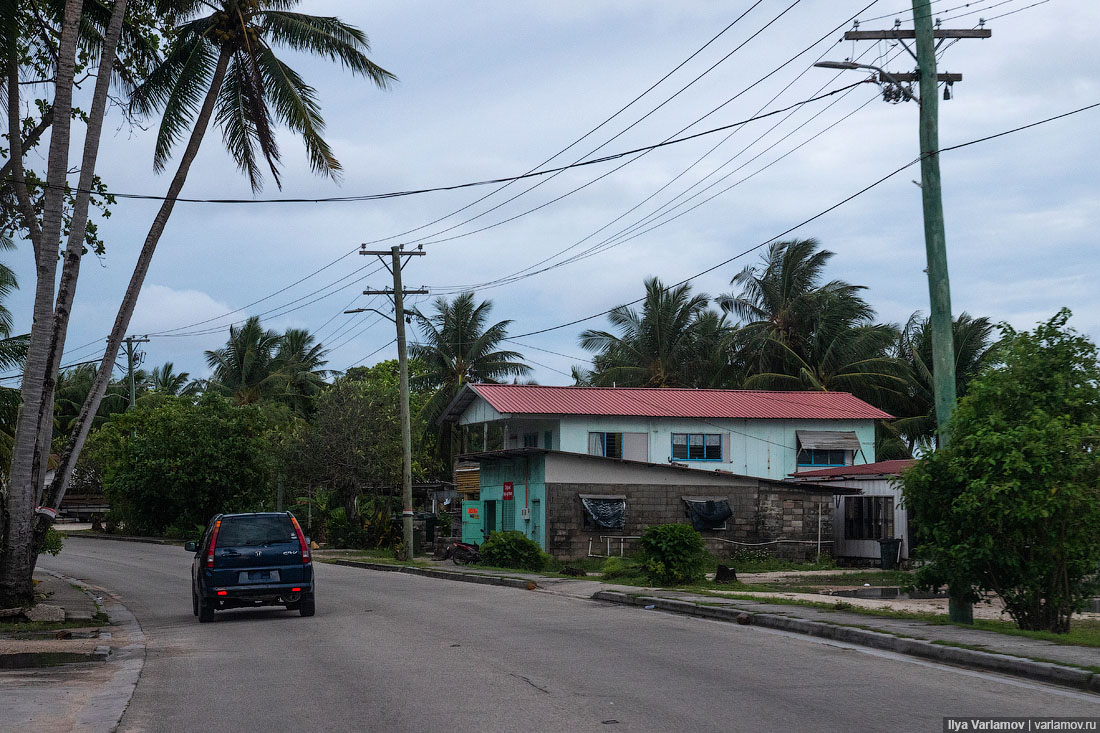
- Parliament House Nauru International Airport Street in Yaren

- Yaren District within Nauru
- Coordinates: 0°32′44″S 166°55′30″E
- Country: Nauru
- Constituency: Yaren

Area
  - Total: 1.5 km^{2} (0.58 sq mi)
- Elevation: 25 m (82 ft)

Population (2021)
  - Total: 803
  - Density: 498/km^{2} (1,290/sq mi)
- Time zone: UTC+12:00 (NRT)
- Area code: +674
- Climate: Af

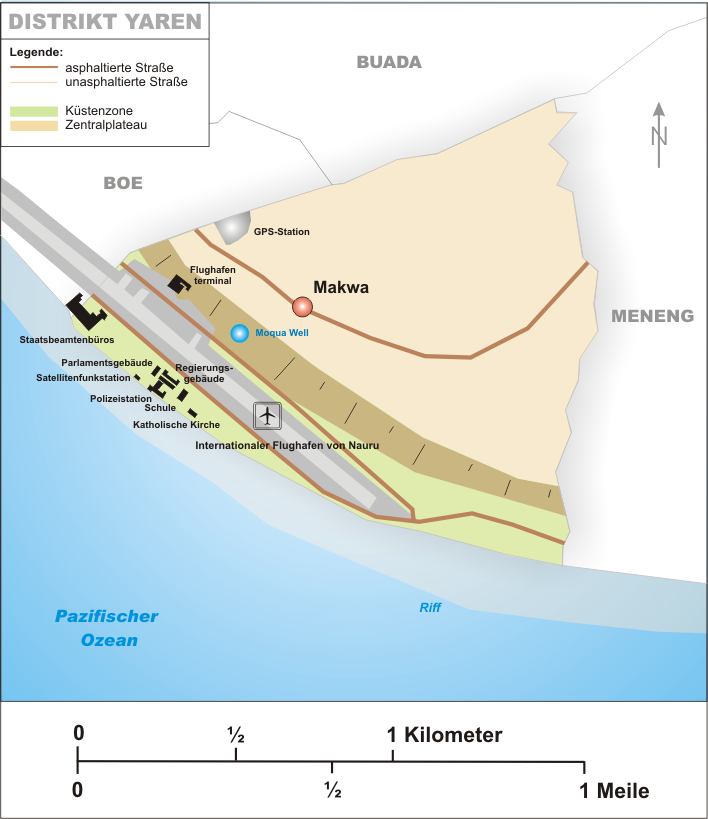
Map of Yaren

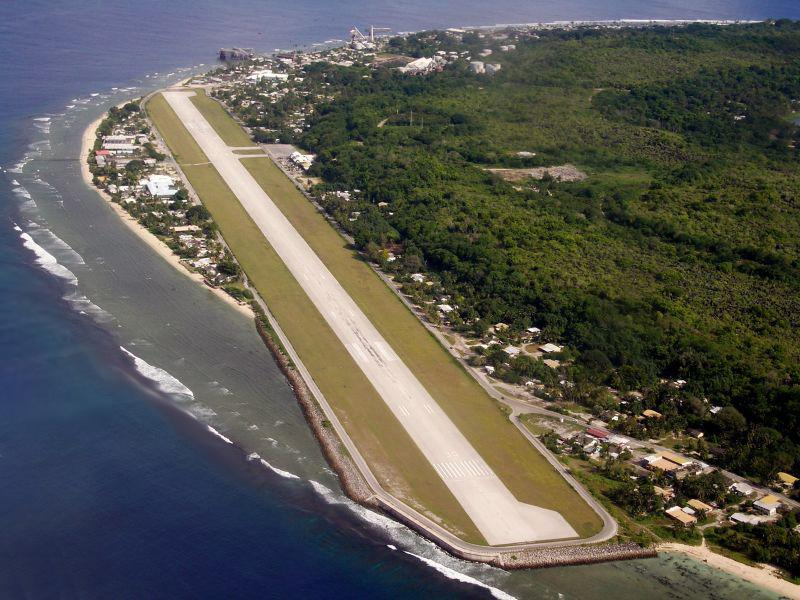
Nauru International Airport

Yaren (Note: also known as Jaren or Yarren) (formerly known as Makwa and Moqua) is a district of the Pacific island country of Nauru, officially the Republic of Naoero. It is the de facto capital of Nauru and is coextensive with Yaren Constituency. Yaren is located on the southern coast of the island and is the location of Nauru's government offices.

== History ==
The district was created in 1968. Its original name, Makwa (or Moqua), refers to Moqua Well, an underground lake and primary source of drinking water for the Nauruan people.

== Geography ==
Yaren is located in the south of the island. Its area is 1.5 km^{2} (0.58 sq mi), and its elevation was 25 metres (82 feet) as of 2007. To the north of Yaren is Buada, to the east is Meneng, and to the west is Boe.

=== Climate ===
Yaren has a marine tropical rainforest climate (Köppen Af) with hot, humid conditions across the year.

Climate data for Yaren District, Nauru
| Month | Jan | Feb | Mar | Apr | May | Jun | Jul | Aug | Sep | Oct | Nov | Dec | Year |
|---|---|---|---|---|---|---|---|---|---|---|---|---|---|
| Record high °C (°F) | 34 (93) | 37 (99) | 35 (95) | 35 (95) | 32 (90) | 32 (90) | 35 (95) | 33 (91) | 35 (95) | 34 (93) | 36 (97) | 35 (95) | 37 (99) |
| Mean daily maximum °C (°F) | 30 (86) | 30 (86) | 30 (86) | 30 (86) | 30 (86) | 30 (86) | 30 (86) | 30 (86) | 30 (86) | 31 (88) | 31 (88) | 31 (88) | 30 (87) |
| Mean daily minimum °C (°F) | 25 (77) | 25 (77) | 25 (77) | 25 (77) | 25 (77) | 25 (77) | 25 (77) | 25 (77) | 25 (77) | 25 (77) | 25 (77) | 25 (77) | 25 (77) |
| Record low °C (°F) | 21 (70) | 21 (70) | 21 (70) | 21 (70) | 20 (68) | 21 (70) | 20 (68) | 21 (70) | 20 (68) | 21 (70) | 21 (70) | 21 (70) | 20 (68) |
| Average precipitation mm (inches) | 280 (11.0) | 250 (9.8) | 190 (7.5) | 190 (7.5) | 120 (4.7) | 110 (4.3) | 150 (5.9) | 130 (5.1) | 120 (4.7) | 100 (3.9) | 120 (4.7) | 280 (11.0) | 2,080 (81.9) |
| Average precipitation days | 16 | 14 | 13 | 11 | 9 | 9 | 12 | 14 | 11 | 10 | 13 | 15 | 152 |
Source: Weatherbase

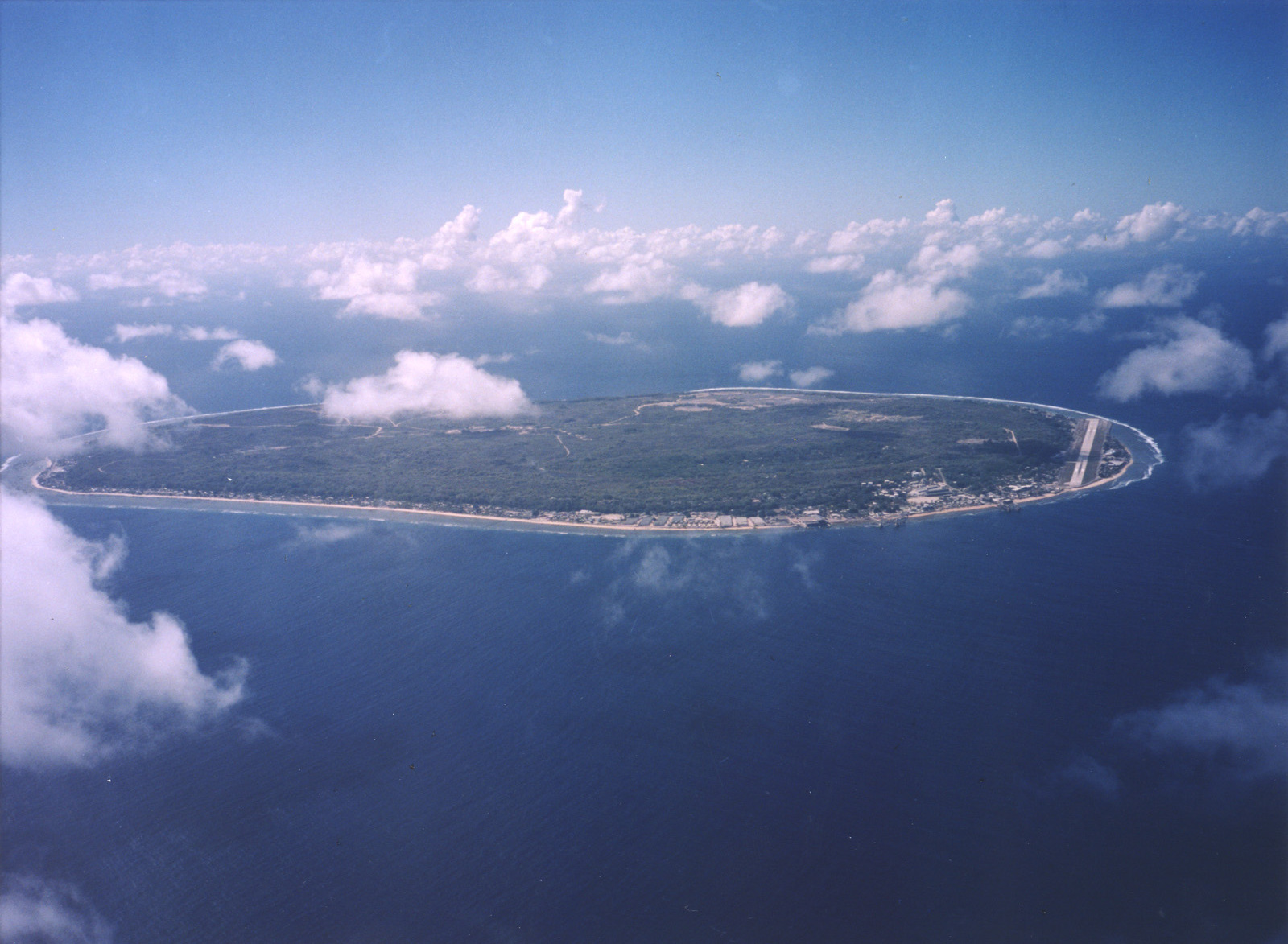
Aerial view of Nauru

== Administration ==
Yaren (and sometimes Aiwo) is usually listed as the capital of Nauru. However, this is incorrect; the republic does not have cities nor an official capital. Yaren is accepted by the United Nations as the "main district".

English and Nauruan, the official languages of Nauru, are spoken in the district.

=== Government and administrative buildings ===
The following government offices are located in this district:

- the Parliament House
- the earth station
- administration offices
- the police HQ
- the fire station
- the Australian High Commission and Taiwanese Embassy
- the Nauru International Airport, air terminal, and head office of Nauru Airlines

=== Constituency ===
Yaren also constitutes a political constituency. It elects two members to the Parliament of Nauru in the national elections every 3 years.

== Main sights ==
- The Moqua Well is situated in Yaren.
- Ella Park is a popular picnicking area in Yaren
- Japanese guns from World War II can be found in Yaren
- The Naoero Museum is located in Yaren and is the national museum in Nauru

== Education ==
The primary and secondary schools serving all of Nauru are Yaren Primary School in Yaren District (Years 1–3), Nauru Primary School in Meneng District (Years 4–6), Nauru College in Denigomodu District (Years 7–9), and Nauru Secondary School (Years 10–12) in Yaren District.

The Nauru Learning Village in Yaren houses the University of the South Pacific Nauru Campus, the Nauru Technical & Vocational Education Training Centre, and Nauru Secondary.

== Notable people ==
- Isabella Dageago (born 1972), politician
- Kieren Keke (born 1971), politician and medical doctor
- Charmaine Scotty, politician
- Dominic Tabuna (born 1980), politician

== See also ==
- List of settlements in Nauru
- Moqua Well
- Nauru Museum
