= Buada district =

Buada
- District
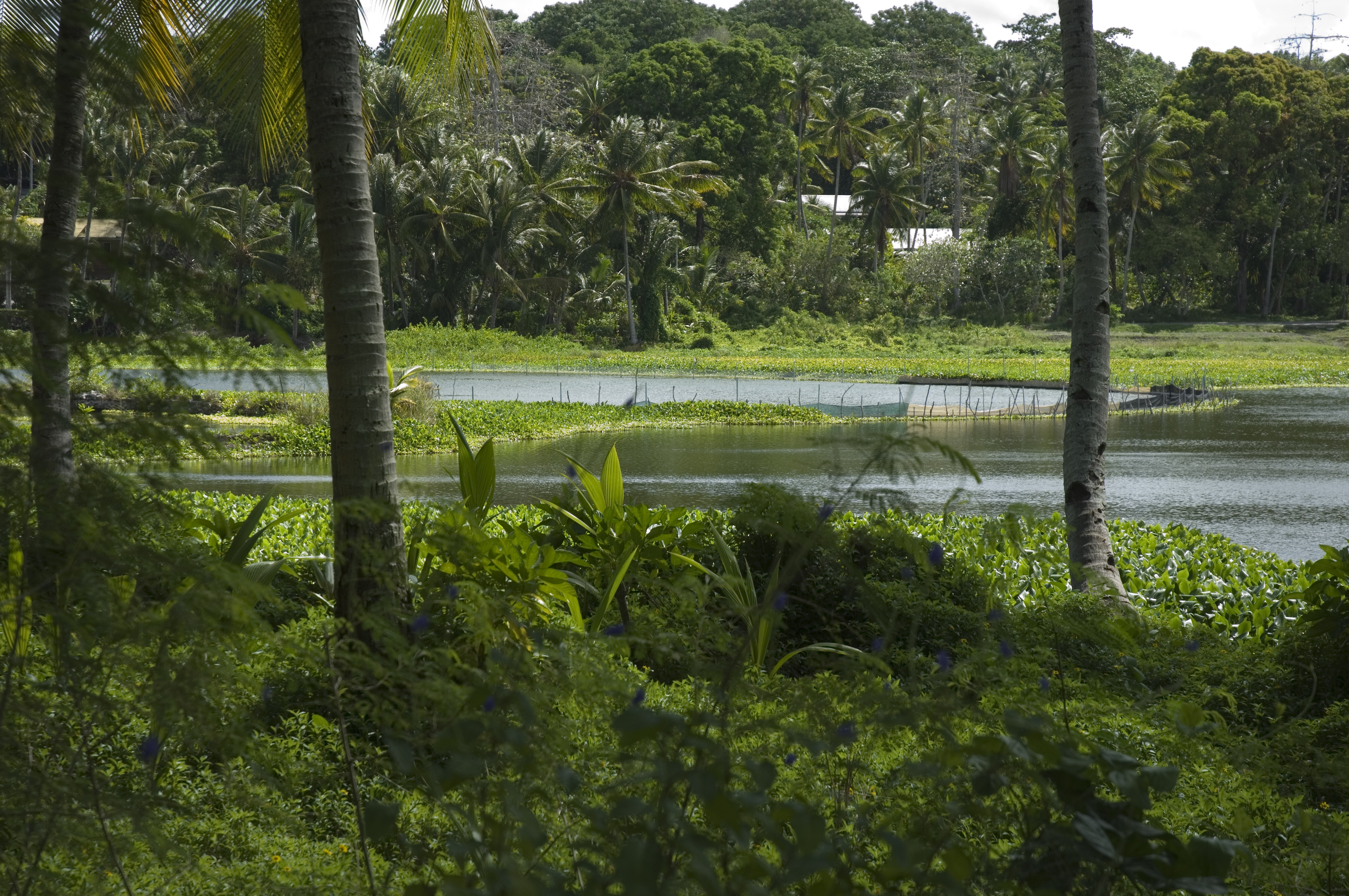
- Buada Lagoon

- Buada District within Nauru
- Coordinates: 0°32′0″S 166°55′0″E
- Country: Nauru
- Constituency: Buada

Area
  - Total: 2.6 km^{2} (1.0 sq mi)
- Elevation: 20 m (66 ft)

Population (2021)
  - Total: 969
- Time zone: (UTC+12)
- Area code: +674

Buada is a district in the Pacific island nation of Nauru. It is the only district in Buada constituency. It has a population of 969 (2021). Several things are special about Buada compared to the coastal areas, it is landlocked, it has a lagoon, and the soil and vegetation here are richer.

== Geography ==
The only landlocked district in the Republic of Nauru, it is in the southwestern part of the island and covers the central Buada Lagoon. Buada is a fertile piece in Nauru and mostly wet and tropical due to the mass vegetation (compared to the rest of the island). It covers an area of 2.6 km^{2} (1.0 sq mi), which in comparison with other of Nauru's districts, makes it among the largest.

Buada has retained more vegetation than other districts, where, because of mining, much vegetation has been lost. The proximity of the Buada Lagoon has been relevant to the survival of vegetation.

== Climate ==
Buada has a tropical rainforest climate (Af) with heavy rainfall year-round.

Climate data for Buada
Month	Jan	Feb	Mar	Apr	May	Jun	Jul	Aug	Sep	Oct	Nov	Dec	Year
Mean daily maximum °C (°F)	30.7 (87.3)	30.6 (87.1)	30.4 (86.7)	30.4 (86.7)	30.6 (87.1)	30.4 (86.7)	30.3 (86.5)	30.4 (86.7)	30.7 (87.3)	31.0 (87.8)	31.2 (88.2)	30.8 (87.4)	30.6 (87.1)
Daily mean °C (°F)	27.7 (81.9)	27.7 (81.9)	27.6 (81.7)	27.6 (81.7)	27.8 (82.0)	27.7 (81.9)	27.5 (81.5)	27.5 (81.5)	27.7 (81.9)	28.0 (82.4)	28.0 (82.4)	27.7 (81.9)	27.7 (81.9)
Mean daily minimum °C (°F)	24.7 (76.5)	24.9 (76.8)	24.9 (76.8)	24.9 (76.8)	25.1 (77.2)	25.0 (77.0)	24.8 (76.6)	24.7 (76.5)	24.8 (76.6)	25.0 (77.0)	24.8 (76.6)	24.7 (76.5)	24.9 (76.7)
Average precipitation mm (inches)	284 (11.2)	251 (9.9)	206 (8.1)	204 (8.0)	129 (5.1)	111 (4.4)	146 (5.7)	140 (5.5)	117 (4.6)	105 (4.1)	115 (4.5)	255 (10.0)	2,063 (81.1)
Source: Climate-Data.org

== History ==
The district held the ancient name Arenibok as early as the 1500s to the late 1800s. The Germans referred to it as 'Bush Village' (1889) after agreeing to its new boundaries located by the Germans, the locals during 1890 named it Buada (ghost land) which is still referred to nowadays.

The last of the few Irutsi clans consisting of four members only, along with the largest of all clans, the Eamwit, inhabited Buada ever since it was known by its original name Arenibok. Few of the other two clans, namely the Emea and the Deiboe clans, also resided with their relatives in Buada

The 10-year Nauruan Tribal War began in this district during a wedding festival in Aujo hamlet in 1878, when a drunk white opened fire and accidentally killed the lad Giubu of the Eamwit clan, nephew of chief Teiauw of the Eaoru clan and a great-nephew of the chief Aremwa.

Arenibok (now Buada) had four main villages, namely Arenibok and Redeto, villages on the banks of the great Arenibok Sea (now Buada Lagoon) and two other villages of Noreo on the steep slopes towards the south and Aujo with its few hamlets towards inland to the north.

== Notable people ==
- Ruben Kun, who represented Buada in the Parliament of Nauru, served as President of Nauru from 1996 to 1997.
- Roland Kun (son of Ruben Kun) is the current (2012) representative for Buada district to the Parliament of Nauru.

== See also ==
- List of settlements in Nauru
- Rail transport in Nauru
- History of Nauru
