= Meneng district =

Meneng
- district
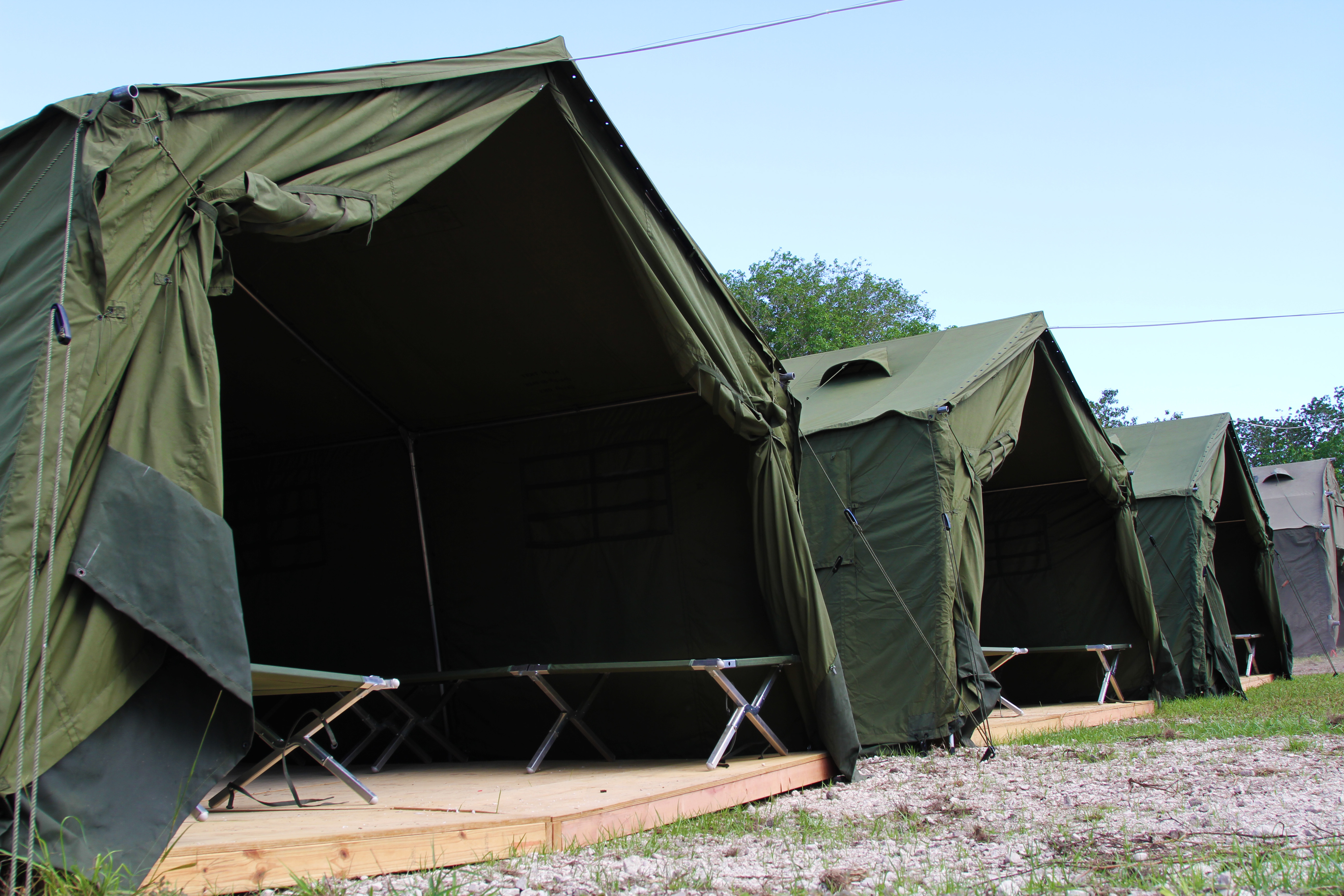
- Nauru Regional Processing Centre

- Meneng district within Nauru
- Coordinates: 0°32′53″S 166°56′22″E
- Country: Nauru
- constituency: Meneng

Area
  - Total: 3.1 km^{2} (1.2 sq mi)
- Elevation: 25 m (82 ft)

Population (2021)
  - Total: 1,797
- Time zone: (UTC+12)
- Area code: +674

Meneng (or Menen) is a district located in the Meneng constituency in the country of Nauru. The constituency elects 2 members to the Parliament of Nauru in Yaren.

== Geography ==
The district is located in the southeast of the island, covering an area of 3.1 km^{2}. It has a population of 1,797. Meneng has 18 villages, the most of any district in Nauru.

== Local features ==
Features in Meneng include:

- The Menen Hotel, one of the island's four hotels
- the wireless station
- the State House (presidential residence; burned down)
- the Government Printing Office
- the Meneng Stadium
- Nauru Regional Processing Centre

== Education ==
Meneng Infant School is in Meneng. The primary and secondary schools serving all of Nauru are Yaren Primary School in Yaren District (years 1–3), Nauru Primary School in Meneng District (years 4–6), Nauru College in Denigomodu District (years 7–9), and Nauru Secondary School (years 10–12) in Yaren District.

The current building of Nauru Primary School opened on October 6, 2016. Canstruct, an Australian firm, built the two-story building, which has eight classrooms. The building, specially designed for Nauruan weather, with ceiling fans and special airflow, may house up to 400 students and is resistant to natural disasters.

== Notable people ==
- Lionel Aingimea, President of Nauru from 2019 to 2022

== See also ==
- List of settlements in Nauru
