= Denigomodu =

District in Nauru

- district
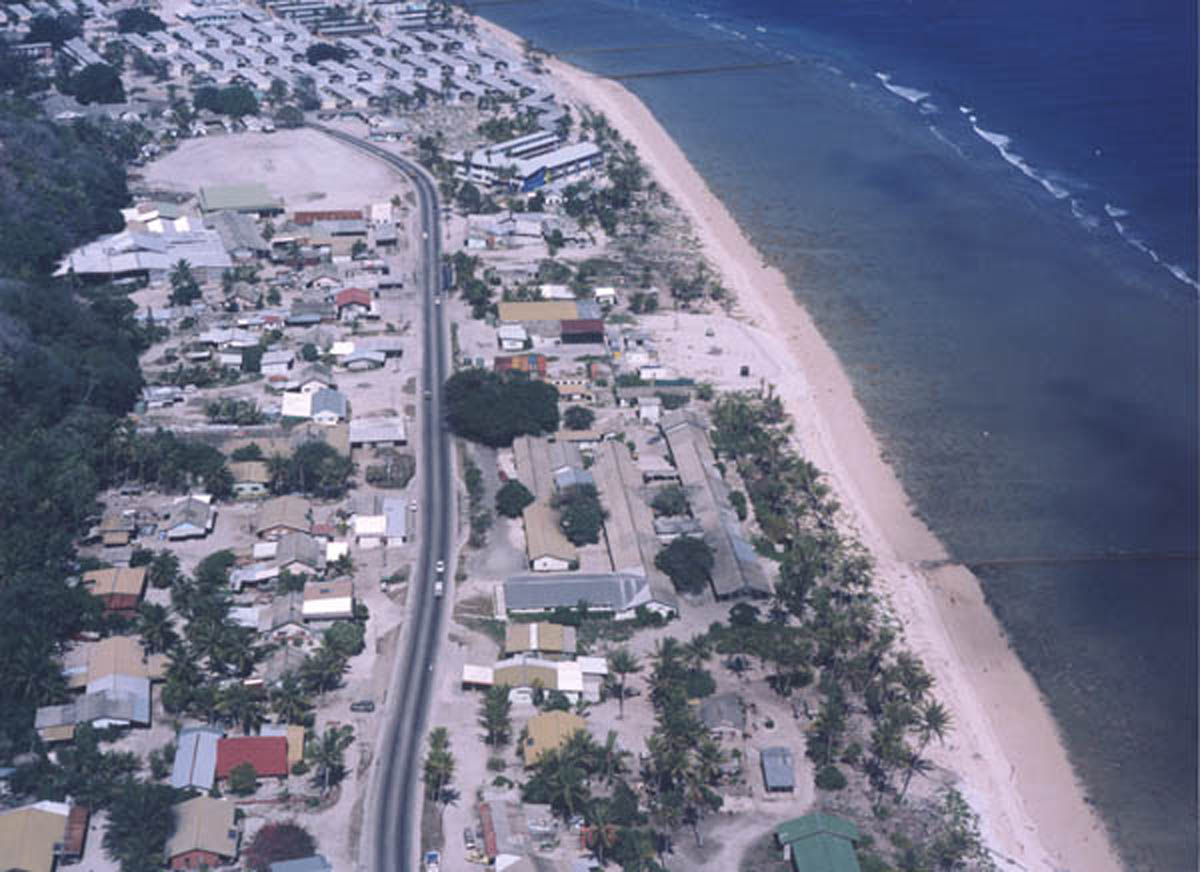
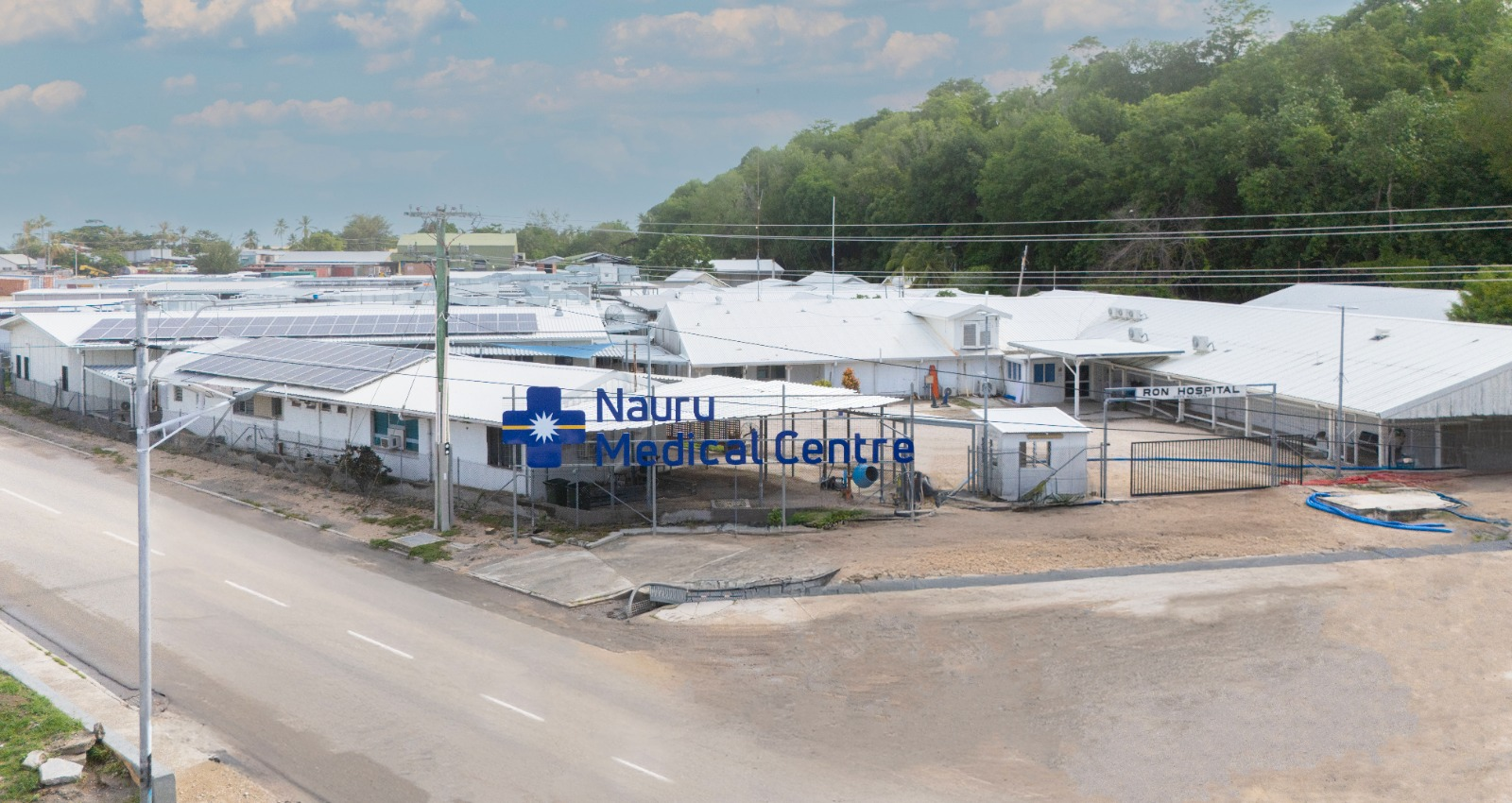
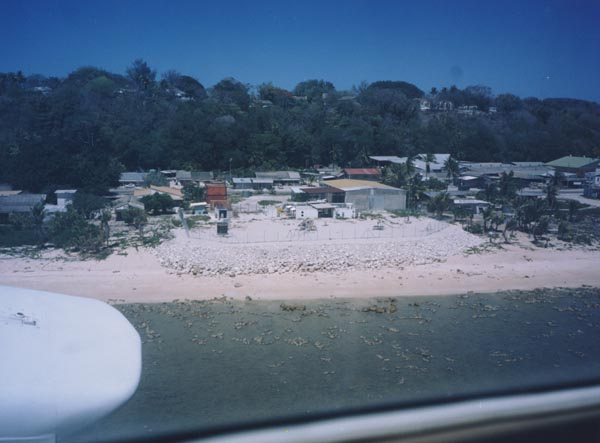
- View of Denigomodu and Nibok Naoero Medical Centre Weather Station

- Denigomodu District within Nauru
- Coordinates: 0°31′25″S 166°54′52″E
- Country: Nauru
- Constituency: Ubenide

Area
  - Total: 0.9 km^{2} (0.35 sq mi)
- Elevation: 20 m (66 ft)

Population (2021)
  - Total: 1,874
  - Density: 2,082/km^{2} (5,390/sq mi)
- Time zone: (UTC+12)
- Area code: +674

Denigomodu is a district in the western part of the island of Nauru. It is the most populous district in Nauru.

It houses the expatriate housing compound "The Location". This makes it Nauru's largest settlement by population. As of 2021, 16% of the people in Nauru (around 1,900 people) live in Denigomodu.

== Geography ==
The district, part of the constituency of Ubenide, covers an area of 1.18 km², and has a population of 1,874, making it the most populous of the fourteen Nauruan districts.

== Local features ==
In this district is the laborers' settlement for the phosphate mining workers of the Nauru Phosphate Corporation (NPC). Also located in Denigomodu are:

- Republic of Nauru Hospital
- NPC planning and construction offices
- Eigigu Supermarket
- State House – official residence of the President

== Education ==
The primary and secondary schools serving all of Nauru are Yaren Primary School in Yaren (years 1-3), Nauru Primary School in Meneng District (years 4-6), Nauru College in Denigomodu District (years 7-9), and Nauru Secondary School (years 10-12) in Yaren District.

Nauru College opened as the Denigomodu School in January 2000 as part of the Rehabilitation and Development Cooperation Agreement between Australia and Nauru, agreed in August 1993. As part of the agreement, the governments decided to build Nauru College in March 1999. It was initially Nauru's third primary school, but it was transitioned into a junior high school with Form 1, as Nauruan children vie for scholarships at that educational stage. The government senior high school of the country is Nauru Secondary School in Yaren.

The expatriate children in the Location settlement attend the Location School, years 1-8 as of April 2002; it is within the "Location" housing development. This is the only school in Nauru which is not English medium.

== Economy ==
Denigomodu is the largest district in Nauru by population. It is highly dependent on tourism. Despite its relative wealth and size in comparison to Yaren, Denigomodu is not considered the central capital of Nauru.

== Notable people ==
- Olympia Zacharias (born 1986), 100m runner
- Maximina Uepa (born 2002), weightlifter

== See also ==
- List of settlements in Nauru
- Rail transport in Nauru
