= Telephone numbers in Nauru =

- Country: Nauru
- Continent: Oceania
- NSN length: seven digits
- Country code: +674
- International access: 00

Nauru's country code is +674, and the international call prefix is 00. There are seven other numbers in the system.

== Telephone ranges ==
In August 2011, Criden Appi, the Director of Telecommunications (Regulatory), said that Nauru advises "only 556xxxx, 557xxxx, 558xxxx are in use for mobiles and there are no landlines in service". In the ranges, X=0-9, and Y=0-9.

=== Mobile telephone number ranges ===
Number range	Service
555 4111	
556 XYYY	
557 8226	
558 XYYY	
559 9386	
559 6085	
999 XYYY	

=== Fixed line area codes ===
Number range	Locality
444 XYYY	
888 XYYY	

=== Special Numbers ===
Service	Short code numbers
Police Emergency Service	110
Fire Emergency Service	112
Ambulance Emergency Service	111
Customer Care	123
Directory Enquiries	192

== See also ==
- Telecommunications in Nauru
