= Germany–Nauru relations =

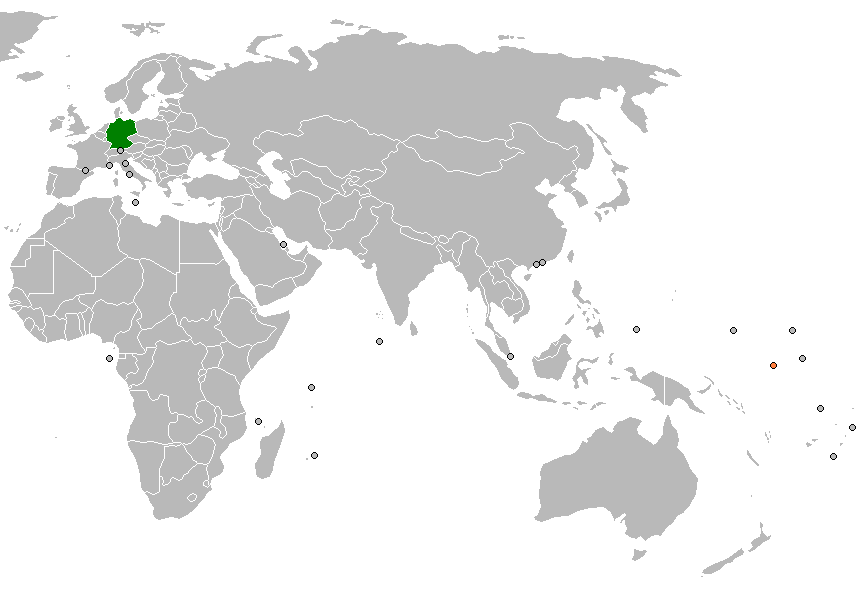

- Germany: Nauru

Germany–Nauru relations are friendly, but due to the great distance between the two countries, they are not particularly intensive. Nauru was a German colony between 1888 and 1914, which had a lasting impact on the island. After that, there were occasional contacts. After independence, Nauru established diplomatic relations with West Germany in 1979. Today, diplomatic relations with Nauru are maintained by the German Embassy in Canberra, whose ambassador is also accredited to Nauru.

== History ==
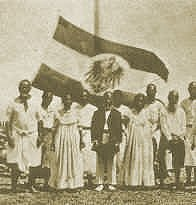
German annexation ceremony in Nauru; in the middle King Auweyida (1888)

Nauru was discovered by Europeans at the end of the 18th century. These contacts brought not only alcohol but also European weapons to the island, which led to devastating civil wars that decimated the Nauruans. In 1896, the German Empire and the United Kingdom signed the Anglo-German Declarations about the Western Pacific, in which they divided the West Pacific into spheres of influence, with Nauru falling within the German sphere. The German tribal war took the Germans to send a ship to the island in April 1888 to take possession and declare Nauru an imperial protectorate, which was attached to the Marshall Islands. In the period that followed, the import of weapons and alcohol was banned, and all weapons had to be handed over to the occupiers, which ended the civil war.

The German commissioner, as representative of the Kaiser, appointed the chief of Boe, Auweyida, and his wife, Eigamoiya, as island chiefs. Law and order was enforced by the Jaluit Company, which was granted economic privileges. German colonization brought major changes for the inhabitants. German-language schools were set up, and Protestant missionaries from Germany spread Christianity. In 1900, phosphate deposits were discovered and exploited by the German-British Pacific Phosphate Company. The Germans settled Chinese laborers on the island for the mining. Phosphate mining shaped the island's economy well into the 20th century, but later also caused significant environmental damage. From 1906, Nauru was administered from German New Guinea. A post office was set up in 1908 and a radio station went into operation in 1913. However, the following year saw the outbreak of the First World War and the island fell to Australia without a fight. All German colonial officials were expelled by the Australians.

During World War II, German raids on Nauru occurred in December 1940, with auxiliary cruisers targeting the phosphate mining on the island. The attacks caused major economic damage and were considered the most successful German attack in the Pacific during World War II. Nauru finally gained its independence from Australia in 1968. On April 15, 1979, the independent state established diplomatic relations with the Federal Republic of Germany. Between 1984 and the German reunification in 1990, there were also official diplomatic relations with socialist East Germany. In the 21st century, both countries have become partners in overcoming the consequences of climate change. In 2018, Nauru, together with Germany, founded the UN Group Climate and Security, which Nauru co-chairs with Germany. In July 2019, Nauru's President Baron Waqa participated in the Berlin Climate and Security Conference organized by the German Foreign Office.

== Economic relations ==
The volume of mutual trade is low. In 2024, Germany exported goods worth 207,000 euros to Nauru and imported goods worth 7,000 euros from Nauru in return. Through its contributions to the European Union's Neighbourhood, Development and International Cooperation Instrument, Germany provides development aid to Nauru.
