= Demographics of Nauru =

- Graph of the population of Nauru, 1886–2011
- Population: 11,680 (2021)
- Density: 554 (2021)
- Growth rate: 0.19% (2002–11)
- Birth rate: 27.20 (2007–11)
- Death rate: 7.50 (2007–11)
- Life expectancy: 63.9 (2021)
  - male: 60.9
  - female: 67.1
- Fertility rate: 3.51 (2020–21)
- Infant mortality: 33.1 (2021)
- Net migration rate: -112 (2021)

Age structure
- 0–14 years: 38.47% (2021 est.)
- 15–64 years: 57.28% (2021 est.)
- 65 and over: 4.23% (2021 est.)

Sex ratio
- Total: 1.02 males/female (2021 est.)
- At birth: 1.05 males/female (2021 est.)
- Under 15: 1.06 males/female (2021 est.)
- 15–64 years: 1.03 males/female (2021 est.)
- 65 and over: 0.64 males/female (2021 est.)

Nationality
- Nationality: noun Nauruan(s), adj. Nauruan
- Major ethnic: Nauruan (92.1%)
- Minor ethnic: Kiribati (2.4%), Fiji (2.2%), Australia (1.2%)

Language
- Official: Nauruan, English

The demographics of Nauru, an island country in the Pacific Ocean, are known through national censuses, which have been analysed by various statistical bureaus since the 1920s. The Nauru Bureau of Statistics have conducted this task since 1977—the first census since Nauru gained independence in 1968. The most recent census of Nauru was on 30 October 2021, when population had reached 11,680 people. The population density is 554 inhabitants per square kilometre (1,430 inhabitants/mi^{2}), and the overall life expectancy is 63.9 years. The population rose steadily from the 1960s until 2006 when the Government of Nauru repatriated thousands of Tuvaluan and I-Kiribati workers from the country. Since 1992, Nauru's birth rate has exceeded its death rate; the natural growth rate is positive. In terms of age structure, the population is dominated by the 15–59-year-old segment (57%). The median age of the population is 21.6, and the estimated gender ratio of the population is 101.8 males per 100 females.

Nauru is inhabited mostly by Nauruans (92.1%), while minorities include those from Kiribati (2.4%), Fiji (2.2%), Australia (1.2%) and other (2.1%). The demographic history of Nauru is marked by several migrations: the area was first inhabited by Micronesian people about 3,000 years ago. The first European to find the island was John Fearn in 1798. Then, the country was annexed by Germany in 1888. The next major population change was when Japanese occupied the island during World War II in 1942. During this time, the Japanese deported several thousands of Nauruans to other islands. In the 1960s, the country gained independence, where the percentage of Nauruans started to increase. The most recent demographic switch was in the 2000s, when the government repatriated several groups of non-Nauruans from the country.

The Nauruan language is the official language of Nauru, but English is often used in the country. Nauruan is declared as the primary language of 95.3% of the population. The 2011 census revealed that 66.0% of the population spoke English and 11.9% another language. The main religions of Nauru are Nauru Congregational Church (35.71%) and Roman Catholic (32.96%). The literacy rate in Nauru is 96.5%. The proportion of the country's population aged 15 and over attaining academic degrees is one of the lowest in the world, reaching 7.9% in 2011. An estimated 10.7% of the gross domestic product (GDP) is spent on education. Nauru has a universal health care system, and in 2012, an estimated 7.5% of its GDP was spent on healthcare. Nauru has the highest obesity ranking in the world; 97 per cent of men and 93 per cent of women are obese. In 2006, the average net monthly income was A$2,597 (A$3848 in 2014). The most significant sources of employment are phosphate mining, banking industries, and various coconut products. In 2011, the unemployment rate was 23%. The 2011 census enumerated 1,647 total households, averaging 6.0 persons per house. Average urbanisation rate in Nauru is 100%.

== Population ==
Historical population of Nauru

Year	Pop.	±% p.a.
1886	1,294	—
1921	2,066	+1.35%
1933	2,641	+2.07%
1947	2,855	+0.56%
1954	3,473	+2.84%
1961	4,613	+4.14%
1966	6,057	+5.60%
1977	6,966	+1.28%

Year	Pop.	±% p.a.
1983	7,674	+1.63%
1992	9,919	+2.89%
2002	10,065	+0.15%
2006	9,233	−2.13%
2011	10,084	+1.78%
2013^{1}	10,293	+1.03%
2021	11,680	+1.59%

^{1} Estimate
Source: The Centre for Independent Studies, Nauru Bureau of Statistics

With a population of under twelve thousand in 2021, Nauru ranks around 193rd in the world by population. Its population density is 478 inhabitants per square kilometre (1,240 inhabitants/mi^{2}). The overall life expectancy in Nauru at birth is 59.7 years. The total fertility rate of 3.70 children per mother is one of the highest in the Oceania. The United Nations projects the population will stay around 10,000 in the 2020s, and the Nauru Bureau of Statistics estimates the population will increase to 20,000 in 2038.

In Nauru's history, there have been six major demographics changes. The island was first inhabited by Micronesian people roughly 3,000 years ago. The first European to find the island was John Fearn in 1798. In 1888, the country was annexed by Germany. The next demographic change came when Japanese occupied the island during World War II in the 1940s. During this time, the Japanese deported several thousands of Nauruans to other islands. The next major demographic change was in the 1960s; the country gained independence, and the percentage of Nauruans started to increase. The last major demographic change was in 2006 when the Government of Nauru repatriated almost all of the remaining Tuvaluan and I-Kiribati workers, following large scale reduction from the Republic of Nauru Phosphate Corporation (RONPhos) and government workers. The census of 2006 stated 9,233 people were in Nauru: down 2.13% per year from the previous census of 2002.

From 2002 to 2011, there has been negative net migration, with an annual 109 net emigrants from 2006 to 2011. In 2009 there were 1,820 arrivals and 1,736 departures, for a positive rate of 84 immigrants. This was the first time since collecting data in 2002, there was a positive rate. Data on arrivals and departures collected by the Nauruan Customs and Immigration Office is not available, so specific immigration data is unavailable. As of the 2011 census, 57% of the population over 15 years old were legally or de facto married, 35% were never married, while 7% were either widowed, separated, or divorced. There are 1,647 households in Nauru, making an average household size of 6.0 persons per household.

Nauru is one of the most Westernized regions of the South Pacific.

=== Structure of the population ===
Population Estimates by Sex and Age Group (01.VII.2016):

Age group	Male	Female	Total	%
Total	5 547	5 467	11 014	100
0–4	839	806	1 645	14.94
5–9	854	725	1 579	14.34
10–14	562	579	1 142	10.37
15–19	525	488	1 012	9.19
20–24	434	402	836	7.59
25–29	461	468	930	8.44
30–34	444	457	900	8.17
35–39	377	346	723	6.56
40–44	277	285	562	5.10
45–49	220	223	443	4.02
50–54	212	240	452	4.10
55–59	152	190	343	3.11
60–64	110	131	242	2.20
65–69	50	77	127	1.15
70–74	15	25	40	0.36
75–79	15	24	39	0.35
80+				
Age group	Male	Female	Total	Percent
0–14	2 255	2 110	4 365	39.63
15–64	3 212	3 231	6 443	58.50
65+	80	126	206	1.87

== Vital statistics ==
For births, deaths, and fertility rates, the Nauru Bureau of Statistics was used. For population, the United States Census Bureau's mid-year estimated were used. If a cell is shaded light green, it indicates the estimate from The World Factbook. In 2013, the number of births (366) and birth rate (38.8) was the second-highest during this period. In 2011, the total fertility rate of 4.2 was the highest since 1992 (4.5). Since 2009, there has been a natural change of at least 200 inhabitants—the first since the reparations of the population in 2006.

Vital statistics of Nauru, 1992–2013
Year	Population	Live births	Deaths	Natural Change	Crude birth rate (per 1000)	Crude death rate (per 1000)	Natural Change (per 1000)	TFR
1992	9,826	331	64	267	33.7	6.5	27.2	4.5
1993	9,823	320	70	250	32.6	7.1	25.5	2.1
1994	9,824	335	53	282	34.1	5.4	28.7	2.2
1995	9,821	309	71	238	31.5	7.2	24.2	2.1
1996	9,830	371	82	289	37.7	8.3	29.4	
1997	9,868	356	97	259	36.1	9.8	25.9	4.1
1998	9,885	304	97	207	30.8	9.8	20.9	2.1
1999	9,874	306	82	224	31.0	8.3	22.7	
2000	9,861	311	70	241	31.5	7.1	24.4	3.7
2001	9,890	325	123	202	32.9	12.4	20.4	3.6
2002	9,916	314	92	222	31.7	9.3	22.4	3.0
2003	9,926	212	76	136	21.4	7.7	13.7	2.5
2004	9,969	253	75	178	25.4	7.5	17.9	3.1
2005	10,014	194	80	114	19.4	8.0	11.4	2.4
2006	9,565	190	88	102	19.9	9.2	10.7	2.3
2007	9,115	171	74	97	18.8	8.1	10.6	2.1
2008	9,162	206	84	122	22.5	9.2	13.3	2.5
2009	9,213	273	57	216	29.6	6.2	23.4	3.2
2010	9,267	322	69	253	34.7	7.4	27.3	3.7
2011	9,322	370	75	295	39.7	8.0	31.6	4.2
2012	9,378	319			34.0	6.0		3.0
2013	9,434	366			38.8			

2011-2021 data from NAURU 2021 POPULATION AND HOUSING CENSUS - ANALYTICAL REPORT

Year	Population	Live births	Deaths	Natural Change	Crude birth rate (per 1000)	Crude death rate (per 1000)	Natural Change (per 1000)	Total Fertility Rate
2011	9,945	427						4.86
2012		378						4.32
2013		353						3.94
2014		350						3.93
2015		371						4.11
2016		395						4.38
2017		380						4.19
2018		317						3.45
2019		283						3.03
2020		327						3.47
2021	11,680	332	74	258				3.41

== Ethnic groups ==
Nauru, as of 2021, is mainly inhabited by Nauruans (92.1%), while the main minority groups include I-Kiribati (2.4%) Fijians (2.2%), and Australians (1.2%). This shows a major change from the previous major census of 2002, when Nauruans represented 75% of the population. According to the Constitution, Nauru does not exclude any ethnic group to become a citizen. The recent sizable immigration event of Chinese people happened in 1993.

Ethnic group	2021		2011		2006		2002	
Ethnic group	Number	%	Number	%	Number	%	Number	%
Nauruan	10,755	92.1	9,031	90.8	9,547	95.8	7,572	75.2
I-Kiribati	275	2.4	194	2	146	1.5	1,259	12.5
Fijian	254	2.2	169	1.7				
Australian	138	1.2	147	1.5				
Tuvalun	80	0.7	45	0.5				
Chinese	16	0.1	139	1.4	61	0.6	463	4.6
Other	162	1.39	220	2.21	214	2.1	771	7.7
Total	11,680	100	9,945	100	9,968	100	10,065	100
Source: Nauru Bureau of Statistics

== Languages ==
The Nauruan language is the official language of Nauru. English is widely understood and is used for most government and commercial purposes, and is official. At the 2021 census, 93.7% of those aged 5+ could speak Nauruan. 28.3% could speak another language. According to the 2011 census, 95.3% of the population speaks Nauruan, 66.0% speak English, and 11.9% speak another language. Nauruan is an Austronesian language, however, no adequate written grammar of the language has been compiled, and its relationships to other Micronesian languages are not well understood.

== Religions ==
Religion in Nauru, 2011
religion	percent
Nauru Congregational	35.7%
Roman Catholic	33%
Assemblies of God	13%
Nauruan indigenous religion	9.5%
Baptist	1.5%
Other or not stated	3.7%

The main religions in Nauru are Nauru Congregational (35.71%), Roman Catholic (32.96%), Assemblies of God (12.98%), and Nauruan indigenous religion (9.50%). The biggest changes from 2002 to 2011 were an increase from 0 to 1,291 (Assemblies of God) and 1,417 to 282 (Other). Public holidays include New Year's Day (1 January), Independence Day (31 January), Good Friday, Easter Monday, Easter Tuesday, Constitution Day (17 May), National Youth Day (25 September), Christmas Day, and Boxer Day.

The indigenous religion was the predominant religion in Nauru before the late nineteenth and early twentieth centuries, when foreign missionaries introduced Christianity to the island. It is still practised by 9.5% of the population, according to 2011 census. There are a few active Christian missionary organisations, including representatives of Anglicanism, Methodism, and Catholicism. The Constitution provides for freedom of religion; however, the Government restricted this right in some circumstances. The government has restricted the religious practices of the Church of Jesus Christ of Latter-day Saints and the Jehovah's Witnesses, most of whom are foreign workers employed by RONPhos.

== Education ==
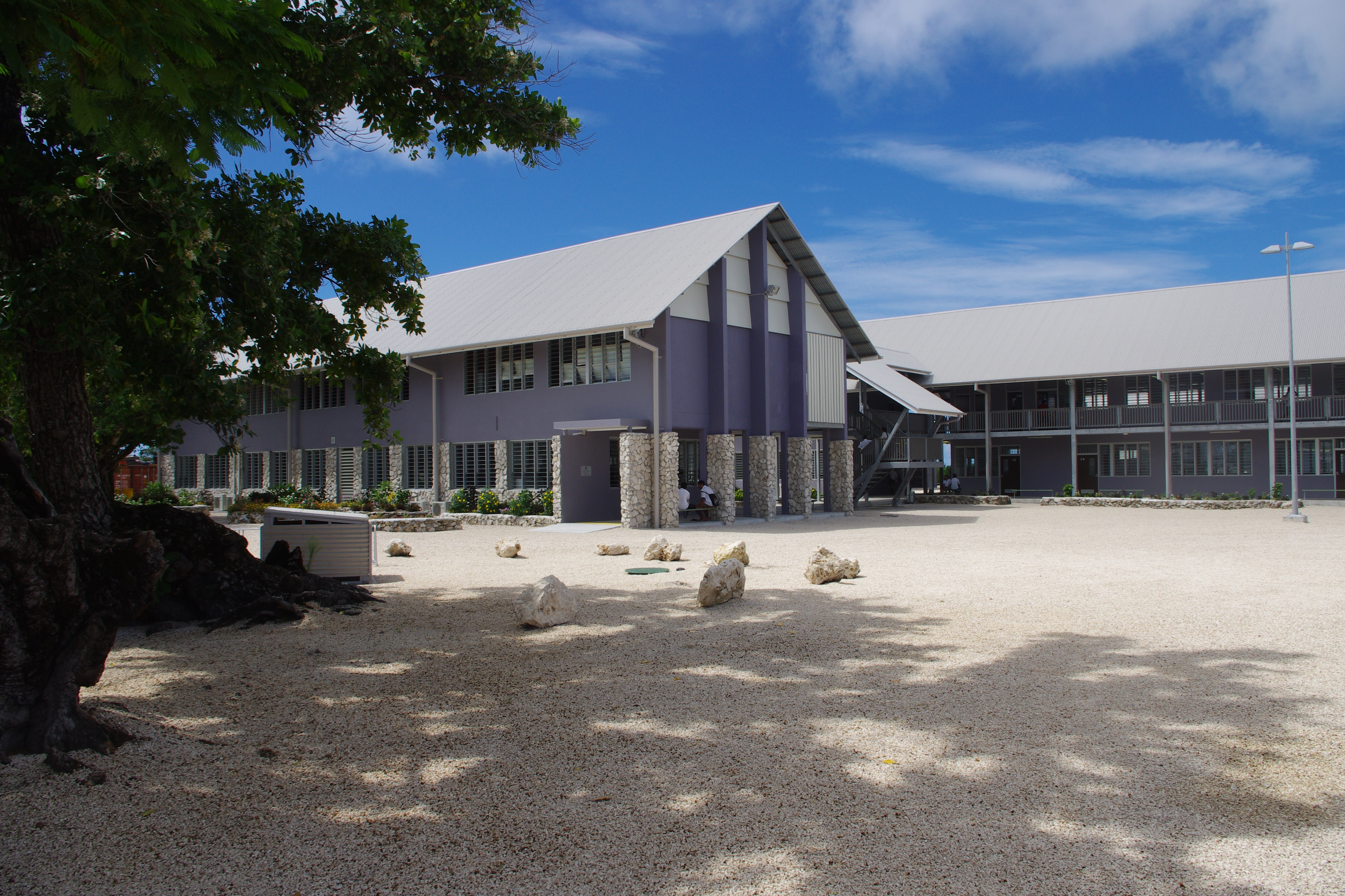
A Nauruan secondary school, 2010

Literacy rate in Nauru, defined as "people who are currently enrolled in school and/or have reached at least grade 5 of primary education", is 96.5%, as of 2011. There are 3,190 students and 104 teachers, as of 2013. The 2011 census stated 4 percent of the population aged 15 years or older have a primary education, 91 percent have a secondary education, and 5 percent have a tertiary education. Education is based on the British system, which requires attendance from 5 to 16 years old. Students spend three years at preschool, six years of primary education, and four years of secondary school. Tertiary school is not required. An estimated 10.7 percent of the GDP was spent on education in 1999. As of 2013, there are five preschools, four primary schools, three secondary schools, and one tertiary school. The lone college, University of South Pacific, opened in the 1970s via distance courses, and in 1987 a campus was built on the island. It offers accounting, management, primary education, and English studies as majors.

The education system had a near-collapse in 2000–2005. During this time, exams were not held, teachers were not paid, and schools did not have enough funding to continue. As a result, over half of the schools closed. In 2009, the Australian Government partnered with the Nauruan Department of Education to help. This agreement resulted in a 5.7% increase in students, teachers with a degree increased from 30% to 93%, and over A$11 million was used to construct a new secondary school.

== Health ==
A universal healthcare system is present in Nauru, which is provided to all citizens of Nauru without charge. There is only one hospital in Nauru, being the Republic of Nauru Hospital in Yaren, which offers basic surgical and medical care. However, patients who would need more advanced care would typically travel to Australian hospitals. In 2012, an estimated 7.5% of its GDP was spent on healthcare. In 2004, 149 physicians and 557 nurses per 100,000 people were present. Nauru has the world's highest obesity rate, with an obesity rate of 71.7%. Nauru's population has a life expectancy of 66 years at birth, ranking it 169th in the world.

== Economic indicators ==
Phosphate exports (in millions of tonnes) in Nauru from 1968 to 2001.

Net monthly income in 2006 averaged A$2,597 (A$3,848 in 2014). In the same year, gross monthly income averaged A$9,554 (A$14,154 in 2014). This was calculated during the mini-census of 2006, which featured 54.4% response rate of the population. The income was calculated using the following factors: first job salary, subsistence, other business income, second job salary, services to other households, benefits, house gifts consumed and received, and other income. Compared to other countries that use the Australian dollar—Kiribati, Australia, and Tuvalu—Nauru ranks number one in terms of income.^{[{{{2}}}]} Since 2013, Nauru does not have a minimum wage.

Nauru's number of employed people has steadily risen and fallen. According to the 2011 census, there are 2,883 employed persons and 908 unemployed persons, making an unemployment rate of 23%. The Nauru Bureau of Statistics predicted the unemployment rate will decrease to 22% in FY2014/15. The gross domestic product of Nauru was A$69.55 million in 2009, an increase of 40% from 2008. The GDP is broken down into three categories: primary (18.7%—agriculture, hunting, forestry, fishing, mining, and quarrying), secondary (36.5%—manufacturing, electric, gas, water, and construction), and tertiary (44.8%—trade, hotel, restaurants, and various services) industries.

A majority of the population are employed in phosphate mining, public administration, education, and transportation. A detention centre was closed in 2008, which caused the unemployment rate to rise to 30%, and approximately ten percent of the population relied on working at the centre. The centre reopened in 2012 and currently serves 1,162 prisoners, as of May 2014. During the 1990s, Nauru was famous for operating offshore banks, helping with money laundering. The United States State Department's International Narcotics Control Strategy Report estimated there were 400 offshore finance centres laundering an estimated $70 billion.

Phosphate mining in Nauru originally made Nauru the richest per capita nation in the world. In 1968, the Nauru Phosphate Royalties Trust (NPRT) was created to invest profits from mining, so Nauru would have money after the mining was exhausted. The owners of the trust purchased a fleet of ships and aircraft, a brewery in the Solomon Islands, hotels around the world, and real estate in Australia, the United States and Britain, which caused the trust to go bankrupt. Phosphate exports peaked in 1973 with 2.3 million tonnes, but has decreased to 0.2 million tonnes in 2001. In 2006, mining of a secondary layer of phosphate began.

== Notes ==
^A For Kiribati, the average annual income was reported as A$8,745, which was divided by 12 months to receive a monthly income. For Australia, the minimum (A$400) and maximum (A$599) average income was taken from the 2006 census and divided by two to receive the average weekly income; this amount was multiplied by 4.33 to receive the monthly income. For Tuvalu, the 2005 monthly income was used with an inflation calculator to provide the 2006 value.

== Sources ==
- Hughes, Helen (2004). "From Rags to Riches: What are Nauru's Options and how can Australia Help?" (PDF). The Centre for Independent Studies. Archived from the original (PDF) on 29 July 2014.
- Nauru Bureau of Statistics (2002). Demographic Profile of the Republic of Nauru, 1992–2002 (PDF) (Report). Vol. Part 2. Nauru Bureau of Statistics.
- Nauru Bureau of Statistics (2007). Nauru Household Income and Expenditure Survey Report 2006 (PDF) (Report). Nauru Bureau of Statistics.
- Nauru Bureau of Statistics (2011). National Report on Population and Housing: Census 2011 (PDF) (Report). Nauru Bureau of Statistics. Archived from the original (PDF) on 24 September 2015.
