= Effects of mining in Nauru =

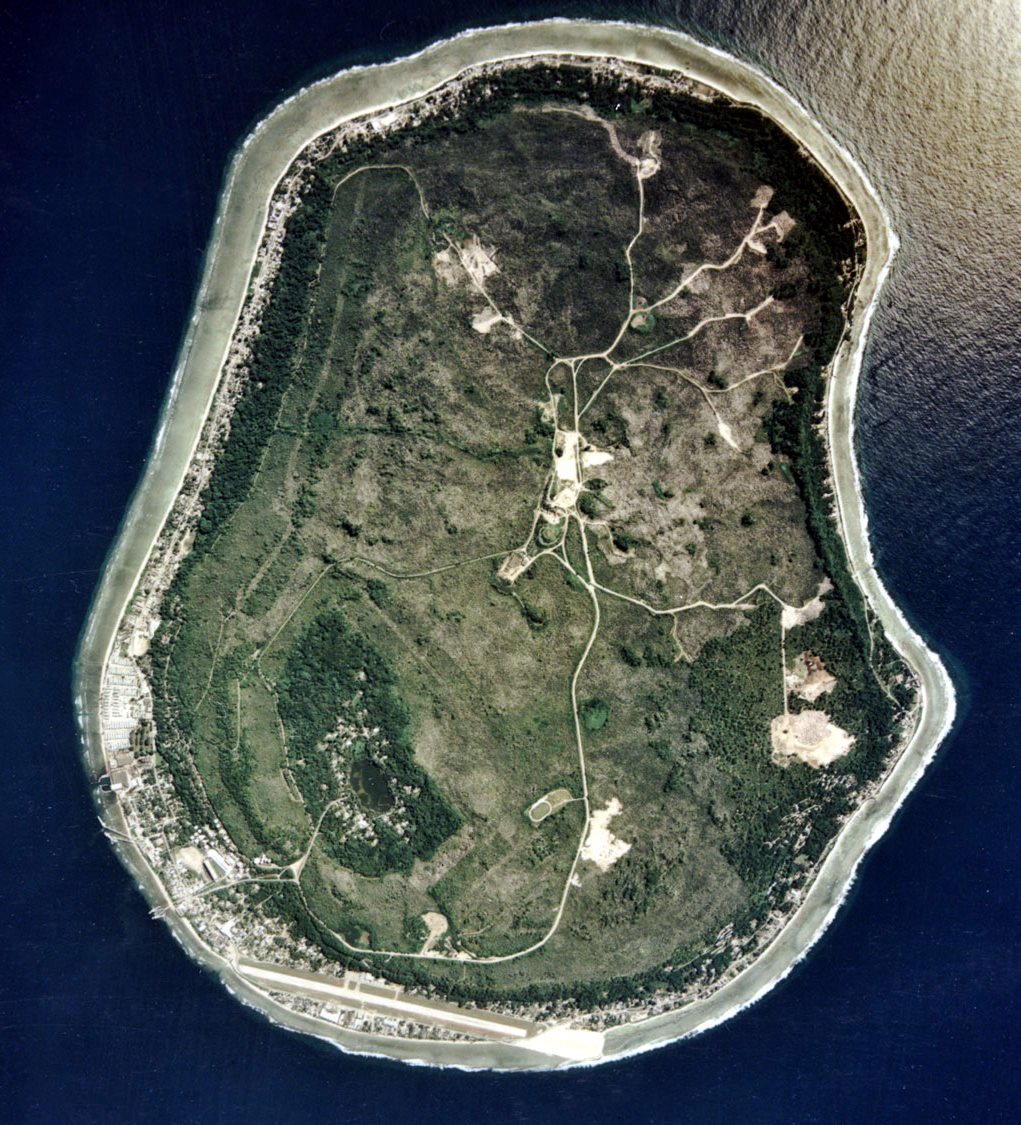
Roughly 80% of Nauru has been decimated by strip mining.

The effects of phosphate mining in Nauru have had significant negative impacts on the island's environment and economy. One of the most prominent effects of the phosphate mining in Nauru is the extensive environmental degradation that has occurred as a result of the extraction of phosphates. Large areas of the island have been stripped of vegetation and topsoil, leaving behind barren landscapes that are prone to erosion and degradation. The mining activities have also caused significant disruption to the island's ecosystem, leading to a decline in biodiversity and the extinction of several plant and animal species.

The mining in Nauru has also had profound social and health consequences for the country. The reliance on phosphate mining as the main source of income has made Nauru extremely vulnerable to fluctuations in global commodity prices, leading to economic instability and uncertainty. The depletion of the phosphate deposits has also left the country with limited options for sustainable economic development, as the once fertile land is now unusable for agriculture or other purposes. This has resulted in high levels of unemployment and poverty among the population, further exacerbating social issues such as crime and substance abuse.

== Environmental issues ==
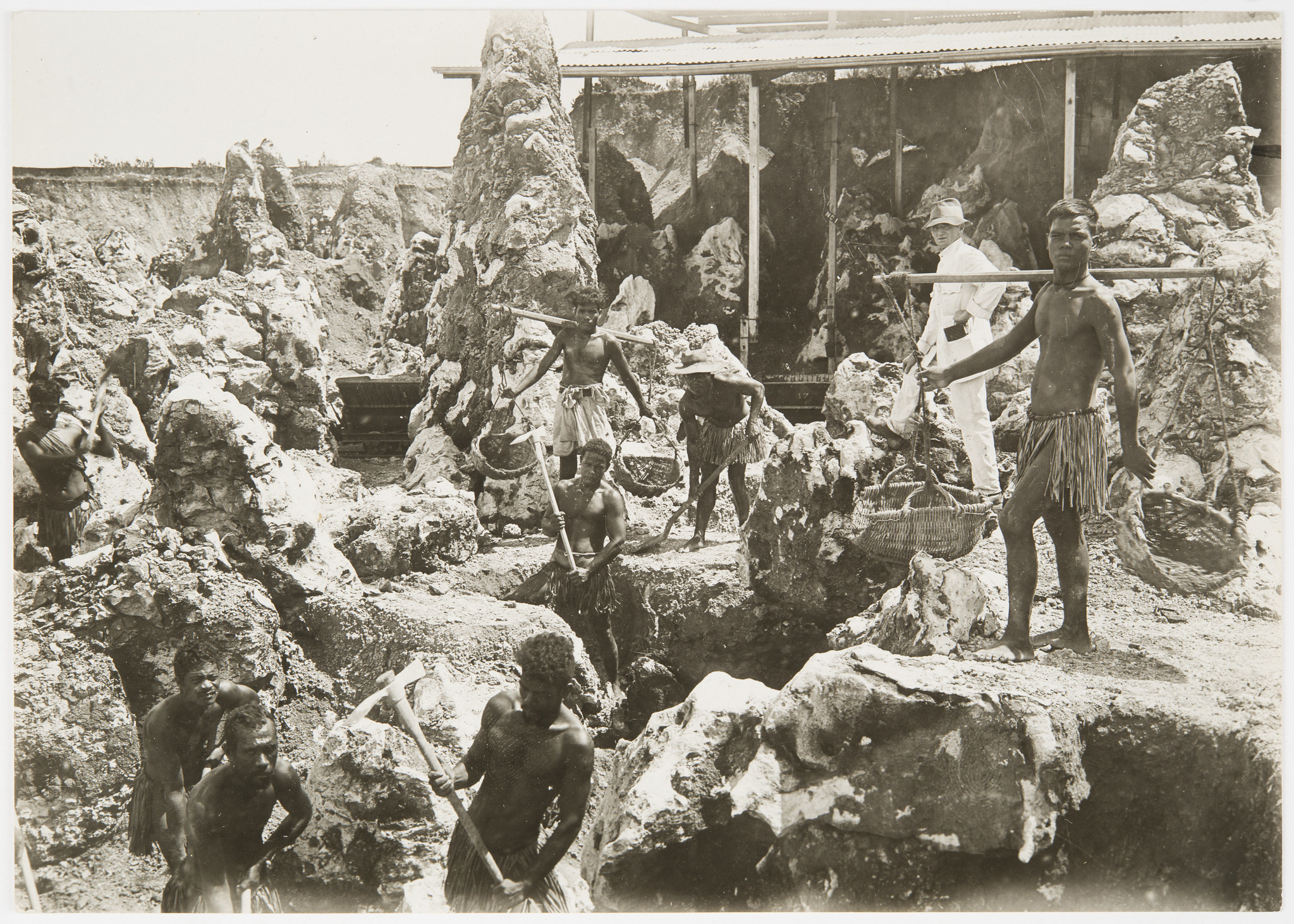
Phosphate mining, Nauru, 1919

Since the early 1900s, Nauru has been mined for phosphorus by many countries, resulting in devastating destruction of the land. As much as 80% of the island is unusable due to phosphorus mining, which has left exposed coral pinnacles that leave the land useless and uninhabitable. The degradation of the land has resulted in a "lower resilience of the natural environment," causing many negative health and environmental effects, like poor water quality, greater erosion rates, poor precipitation, higher droughts, and greater CO_{2} emissions. The damage done through mining extends further by ocean acidification and coastal erosion, these have threatened the terrestrial and marine biodiversity. The people of Nauru also face continued negative health effects from the mining in the form of phosphate dust pollution and cadmium pollution, tainting the water and air quality. As a result, the rate of care-seeking for children under 5 years of age with ARI is 69% according to UNICEF data. Due to the extent of the mining, there is not much that can be done now to alleviate the agricultural problems that Nauruans face besides monetary reparations, which Nauru pursued from the Australian Government in 1989, through the International Court of Justice in The Hague, Netherlands, The lawsuit was settled in 1993 in an out-of-court payout of $120 million AUD over 20 years.

Phosphate mining has removed most of the vegetation and tree coverage that Nauru had, leaving the land and the people vulnerable to intense heat on an island so close to the Equator. The effects of the vegetation removal has been most felt by refugees in the Nauru detention center, which is in the very centre of the island where the majority of the mining is done. Along the coast, where most Nauruans are forced to live now due to the land reduction caused by mining, the coastal plants that remain are vital for the "provision of shade and animal and plant habitats; protection from wind, erosion, flood, and salt water incursion; land stabilization; protection from the desiccating effects of salt spray; and soil improvement and mulching," especially as the coast is expected to continue eroding with the increasing effects of climate change.

== Social effects ==
Because phosphate mining, and now deep-sea mining, has been going on for so long, it is hard to parse out exactly how it has affected the Nauruan people. Researchers have offered that the Nauruan people likely have a loss of their sense of place and culture, as they did not have full control of their land until 1968. There has also been a documented loss of Nauruan traditions like subsistence farming as well as the violations of their rights to their own land and the continued human rights violations that continue at the Nauru detention centre. The Nauruan people face extremely high rates of obesity, alcoholism, prostitution, mental illness, and a myriad other health issues that stem from these problems. A study done in 2014 by The Nauru Family Health and Support Study implemented by Nauru Department of Home Affairs and DFAT and the United Nations Population Fund (UNFPA) have shown an alarming prevalence of violence in romantic relationships on the island, with 48.1% of ever-partnered women who participated saying they have experienced physical or sexual violence at least once. A quarter of women in the same study have experienced violence in at least one pregnancy, and 9.9% of women had experienced some form of violence in the past 12 months. In another study surveying sexual health, 21% of a portion of the population tested positive for chlamydia. In the same survey, 30% of school children aged 13–15 reported having attempted suicide, and 24% of children under the age of five are stunted. Though Nauruans are currently still searching for a way to stay on the island and live viable lives, some speculate that the only way for them to do so is to continue mining the phosphorus that is left (30 years or so).

== See also ==
- Phosphate mining in Banaba and Nauru
