= Flag of Nauru =

Nauru
- Use: State flag and civil ensign
- Proportion: 1:2
- Adopted: 31 January 1968; 58 years ago
- Design: A blue field with a thin yellow horizontal stripe across the centre and a large white twelve-pointed star directly below the stripe on the hoist side.

The national flag of Nauru is a blue field with a horizontal gold stripe and a twelve pointed white star underneath the line on the left side. The blue field represents the Pacific Ocean, the gold stripe represents the Equator, and the star represents Nauru's geographic location, which is less than one degree under the Equator. It was adopted after a local competition held after the country gained independence in 1968.

== Design and symbolism ==
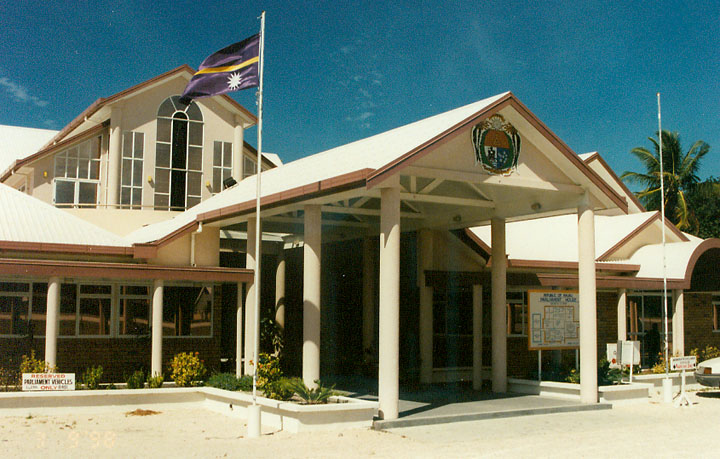
The flag flying at the Parliament of Nauru

Ahead of Nauru's independence on 31 January 1968, a local competition was held to design a new flag. Nauru's flag was chosen from one of the designs submitted to the competition. The flag consists of a horizontal gold stripe on the center of a blue field, and a white twelve pointed star underneath the stripe on the hoist (left) side. The blue field represents the Pacific Ocean, the stripe represents the Equator, and the star represents Nauru's geographic location relative to the two, as Nauru lies less than one degree south of the Equator. The star is on the hoist side because Nauru is on the left of the International Date Line. The twelve points of the star represent the twelve original tribes of Nauru (Eamwit, Eamwitmwit, Ranibok, Irutsi, Iruwa, Eamwidara, Eaoru, Emangum, Deiboe, Eano, Emea, and Iwi), with its white colour representing phosphate, which was Nauru's main source of income. Its colours are similar to other flags used in Oceania. On their website, the Government of Nauru describes the flag as "very simple and plain". It is one of many national flags to use a star as a symbol of independence and sovereignty, influenced by the flag of the United States. On 9 February 1969, the government released a stamp featuring the flag of Nauru.

The flag's construction sheet

Legally, the flag of Nauru is defined by the Naoero National Anthem Emblem and Flag Protection Act 2018, which states;

The rectangular flag is divided into three portions horizontally; the top portion is blue; the middle portion is yellow; the bottom portion is blue and a large white 12-pointed star below the yellow stripe on the hoist side. The top and bottom portions are in equal portions. The blue represents the Pacific Ocean, the star indicates the country's location in relation to the Equator (the yellow stripe) and the 12 points symbolise the 12 original tribes of Nauru.

== See also ==
- Coat of arms of Nauru
- Nauru graph, named after its resemblance to the 12-pointed star on the flag
