= Angam Day =

Holiday in Nauru

- Observed by: Republic of Naoero
- Significance: Flourishing of the dei-Naoero people
- Date: 26 October
- Next time: 26 October 2026
- Frequency: Annual

Angam Day is a holiday recognised in the Republic of Naoero. It is celebrated yearly on 26 October.

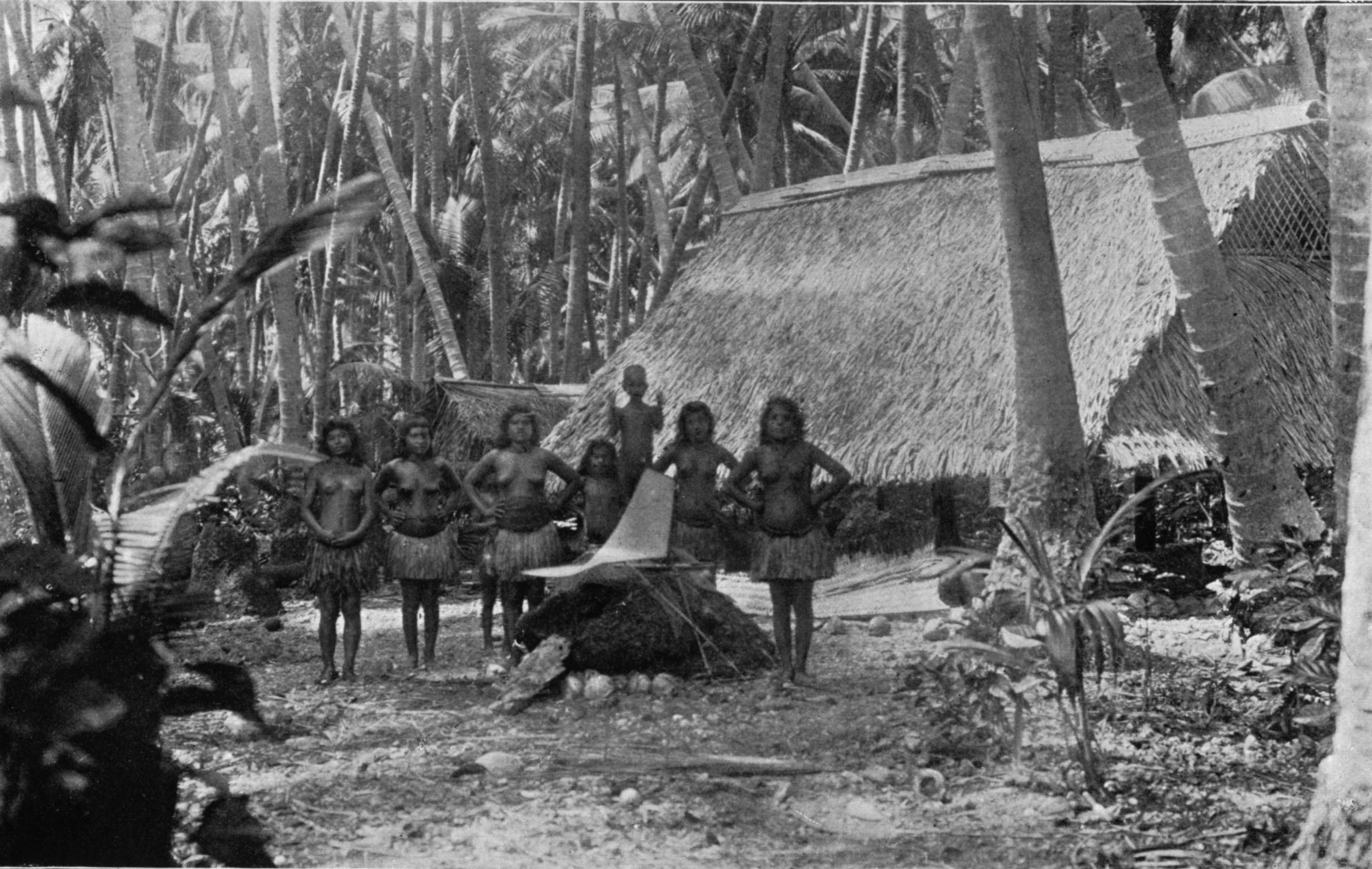
1896

== Etymology ==
The Naoeroan word angam means "jubilation", "celebration", "to have triumphed over all hardships" or "to have reached a set goal" or "coming home".

== General ==
Angam Day is a day of celebration and a time of reflection for the Nauruan people. Twice in its history, the Nauruan population fell below 1,500, and the Nauruan ethnic group have been considered in danger of extinction. On both occasions the Nauruan population recovered. Upon eclipsing a population of 1,500, a number considered to be the minimum required for the survival of a race (decided by the administrators of Nauru its chiefs after much deliberation), Angam Day was declared. The first Angam was in 1932 and the second occasion in 1949.

== History ==
=== Before Angam ===
As early as 1902, an influenza epidemic took toll of no less than 219 lives. At the time of the initial phosphate operations during 1905 the population was about 1,550. With the introduction of labour for the phosphate operations, a sudden downward trend in brought by the newly introduced labour. This spate of epidemics included many casualties among the Nauruan people. During 1907, infantile paralysis systematically killed the Nauruan population.

The first goal came about in 1919, just after World War I, when the war-time occupation of Nauru and other Pacific islands was continued by forces of the British Empire, who had, in contravention of international treaty obligations, wrested these colonies from Imperial Germany. Nauru came under a League of Nations mandate, administered by Australia, New Zealand and Britain. Brigadier-General Thomas Griffiths, the Australian Administrator, held a census. Later, in a meeting with local chiefs, he declared that the population of Nauruans was alarmingly low and that if the Nauruans were to survive as a race, the population should be no less than 1,500. It was declared that when the population of 1,500 was reached, that day would be called Angam Day, would be a public holiday, and would be commemorated every year thereafter, as a prize to the mother. Furthermore, the baby who completed the set target would be the Angam Baby and would receive gifts and honour.

=== First Angam ===
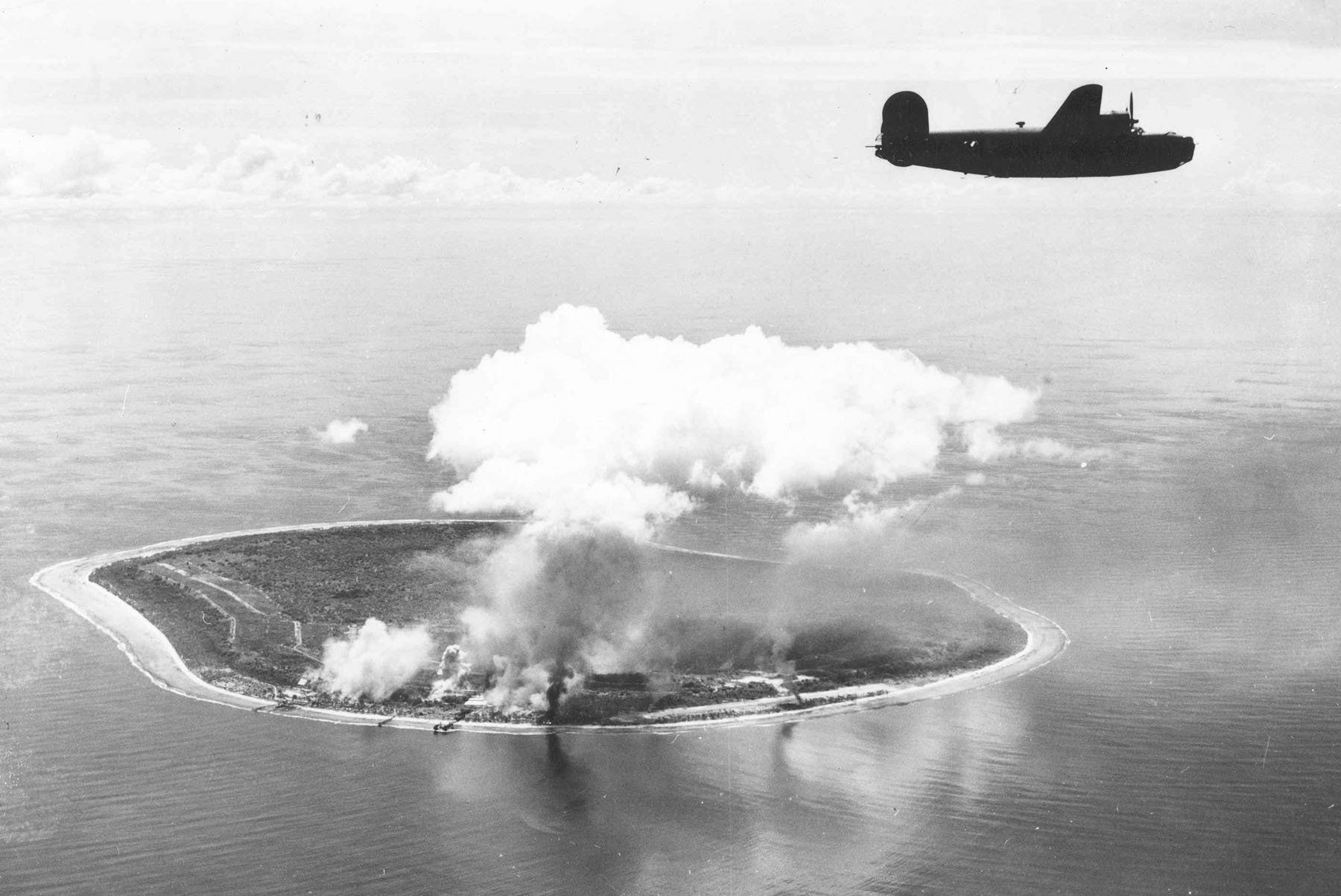
1943

After thirteen years, the Nauruan population reached 1,500 to much jubilation and celebrations. The first Angam Baby, Eidagaruwo, was born on 26 October 1932. Her name expresses the feeling of “reaching home” or “attaining a goal”; it was given to her by the Administrator and Chiefs. That night large bonfires were lit on the beach on every district and chiefs judged who had the biggest bonfire. Aiwo District had the largest bonfire with blue flames, made by stoking the fire with copper wire.

It turned out there was to be more than one Angam. During the Japanese occupation of Nauru and other Pacific territories during World War II, 1,201 Nauruans were evacuated to Truk (now Chuuk). Of the 1,201 evacuees to Truk only 737 returned after the war, and of the about 600 left behind on Nauru, a total of around 400 survived.

The Angam girl, Eidegenegen Eidagaruwo, did not make it back from Truk as she had died of malnutrition and yaws like most of the other Nauruans who had died in Truk.

=== Second Angam ===
The aftermath of WWII showed the Nauruans that, to survive as a race, they would have to strive to increase their population for a second time. The race for a new Angam Baby was on.

On 31 March 1949, the people of Boe celebrated when Bethel Enproe Adam was born to parents Kenye and Clarence Adam. Since then, the Nauruans have been able to celebrate Angam once again. Even though Bethel Enproe was born on a different date, 26 October is still held as the official Angam Day.

== Modern Angam Day Celebrations ==
In 2017, at 91 years old, Muriel Cecil was the oldest Nauruan. She spoke on behalf of fellow survivors of the war underscoring in simple terms the hardship of war yet the blessings of God in bringing them back home from Truk Island.

Muriel donned a replica of the dress she and other female returnees from Truk wore on their return to Nauru in 1946 after two years in exile.

== See also ==
- COVID-19 pandemic in Oceania#Nauru
- History of Nauru
- Public holidays in Nauru
