= Public holidays in Nauru =

This is a list of holidays in Nauru, an island nation in Micronesia.

Date	Name
1 January	New Year's Day
31 January	Independence Day
8 March	International Women's Day
Friday before Easter Sunday	Good Friday
Monday after Easter Sunday	Easter Monday
Tuesday after Easter Sunday	Easter Tuesday
17 May	Constitution Day
1 July	RONPhos Handover Day
19 August	Ibumin Earoeni Day
25 September	Sir Hammer DeRoburt Day
26 October	Angam Day
25 December	Christmas Day
26 December	Boxing Day
