= Chinese people in Nauru =

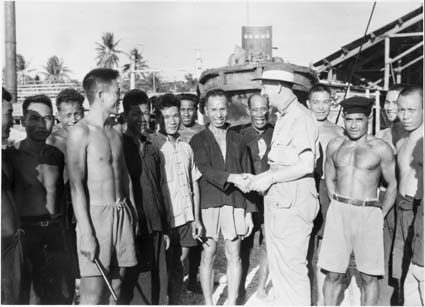
- Chinese residents welcome British Phosphate Commission Chief Engineer W V Bott to Nauru, 1938

Total population
- 16 (2021)

Related ethnic groups
- Chinese people, Chinese in Fiji, Chinese in Palau, Chinese in Tonga, Chinese in Samoa

The Chinese diaspora in Nauru is small. It is mostly descended from phosphate miners who arrived in the early 1900s.

== History ==
Chinese people first arrived in Nauru in 1907 by the Pacific Phosphate Company. At this point the island was under the administration of the German Empire, and was being used for phosphate mining. The Chinese were more willing to work than the native Nauruans. Most were not permitted to become permanent residents; however many regularly renewed their contracts to continue living in Nauru. In 1942, the majority of Chinese in Nauru were evacuated before the Japanese invasion of the island; only 180 remained. Under Japanese rule they were treated far worse than the Nauruans, receiving less rations and being left to starve. In September 1945, after the end of WW2, Australia took control of the territory and looked to rebuild the mining industry. By 1948, the Chinese population had grown again, to 1,400.

On 7 June 1948 a group of Chinese started a riot when they refused to board a boat back to China after not being paid from community funds. The riot led to a large police operation, in which 49 were arrested. A Nauruan policeman, Police Constable Agoku, was charged with the unlawful killing of two Chinese rioters.

== 21st century ==
In 2002, 28 respondents gave their nationality as Hongkonger. In 2011 this had reduced to zero. In the 2011 census, 152 residents of Nauru stated their nationality as Chinese. Out of these, 145 said their nationality was of the People's Republic of China (PRC) and 7 of the Republic of China (ROC). 51 respondents said their place of birth was the PRC, 88 ROC and 12 Hong Kong.

== See also ==
- Overseas Chinese
