= Nauruan Civil War =

Civil war in Nauru, 1878–1888

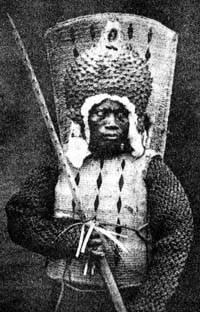
- Photo of a Nauruan warrior in the Nauruan Civil War around 1880 wearing traditional battle armour.
Date	1878 – October 1888
Location	Nauru
Result	Loyalist and German victory
Territorial changes	Nauru is annexed as part of German New Guinea by the German Empire

Belligerents
King Aweida loyalists German Empire (1888)	Anti-Aweida rebels

Commanders and leaders
King Aweida of Nauru	Unknown rival claimant

Units involved
Loyalists (German Empire) SMS Eber	Rebels

Casualties and losses
- Nauruan population reduced from 1400 to 900, a 36% decrease in the population.

The Nauruan Civil War was fought from 1878 to 1888, between forces loyal to incumbent King Aweida of Nauru and those seeking to depose him in favour of a rival claimant. The war was preceded by the introduction of firearms to the island and its inhabitants, Nauruans, as a whole. For the majority of the war, the loyalists and the rebels found themselves in a stalemate, with one side controlling the northern and the other the southern part of the island.

In 1888, the German Empire intervened by restoring Aweida to the throne and confiscating combatants' firearms; by the time they finished, the German soldiers had confiscated 791 rifles from both belligerents, nearly one gun for every remaining living adult inhabitant of the island. By historical estimates, Nauru had a population of approximately 1,400 in 1848; by the end of war, there were about 900 inhabitants.

Having effectively been put under German control with the civil war's ceasefire, Nauru was shortly thereafter annexed into the German colonial empire. It became a distinct polity within German New Guinea in 1906 and it was subsequently captured by the Australian expeditionary force in 1914, at the outbreak of World War I.

== Background ==
When the British captain John Fearn came to Nauru in 1798, the island had been avoided by sailors, due to its notoriety as a station for pirates. Nevertheless, in the 19th century, the immigration of Europeans, often lawbreakers, steadily increased. Traditional life had been disrupted by the introduction of firearms and spirits, a form of alcoholic drink unknown to Nauruans, although the Nauruans had consumed palm wine for several thousand years.

== Timeline ==
=== Outbreak ===
The conflict began during a marriage festival following a verbal altercation regarding tradition. While discussing a point of etiquette, one of the attendees fired a pistol and fatally shot the son of a clan chief. In the context of Nauruan culture, the obligation to avenge the man's death was considered unequivocal. Former feuds had their origins in similar incidents; however, this incident was the first recorded example following the introduction of firearms that had become commonplace. The conflict saw the island divided into a north and a south.

=== War reports ===
A squadron of the British Royal Navy anchored off the coast of Nauru on 21 September 1881, and the squadron's flagship approached the island, to appraise the local situation. An acculturated local beachcomber, William Harris, boarded the British ship, which summoned the rest of the squadron by semaphore that evening, saying that a tribal war was raging, that all of the islanders were drunk, that the actual king of the island, Aweida, wished to have missionaries come to the island to help stop the war.

Six years later, an Auckland-dwelling British sea captain named Frederick Moss came in his schooner, the Buster, landing on Nauru while his ship was being reloaded with copra. He reported that the inhabitants of Nauru were friendly and of good humor, although most of the boys and all of the men were armed with rifles and carbines. The war was still going on, although by this time it appeared that many of the islanders had had enough. Through his conversations with the natives, Moss noted that none of them wished to continue fighting, but no tribal group trusted the others to lay down their arms if it did so first. They wished for universal disarmament of the island. Moss received another report from Harris, who still lived on the island. Harris said that two of his family members had already been shot and that he wished a Christian mission would come to the island to restore peace once again.

=== German annexation and end of the war ===
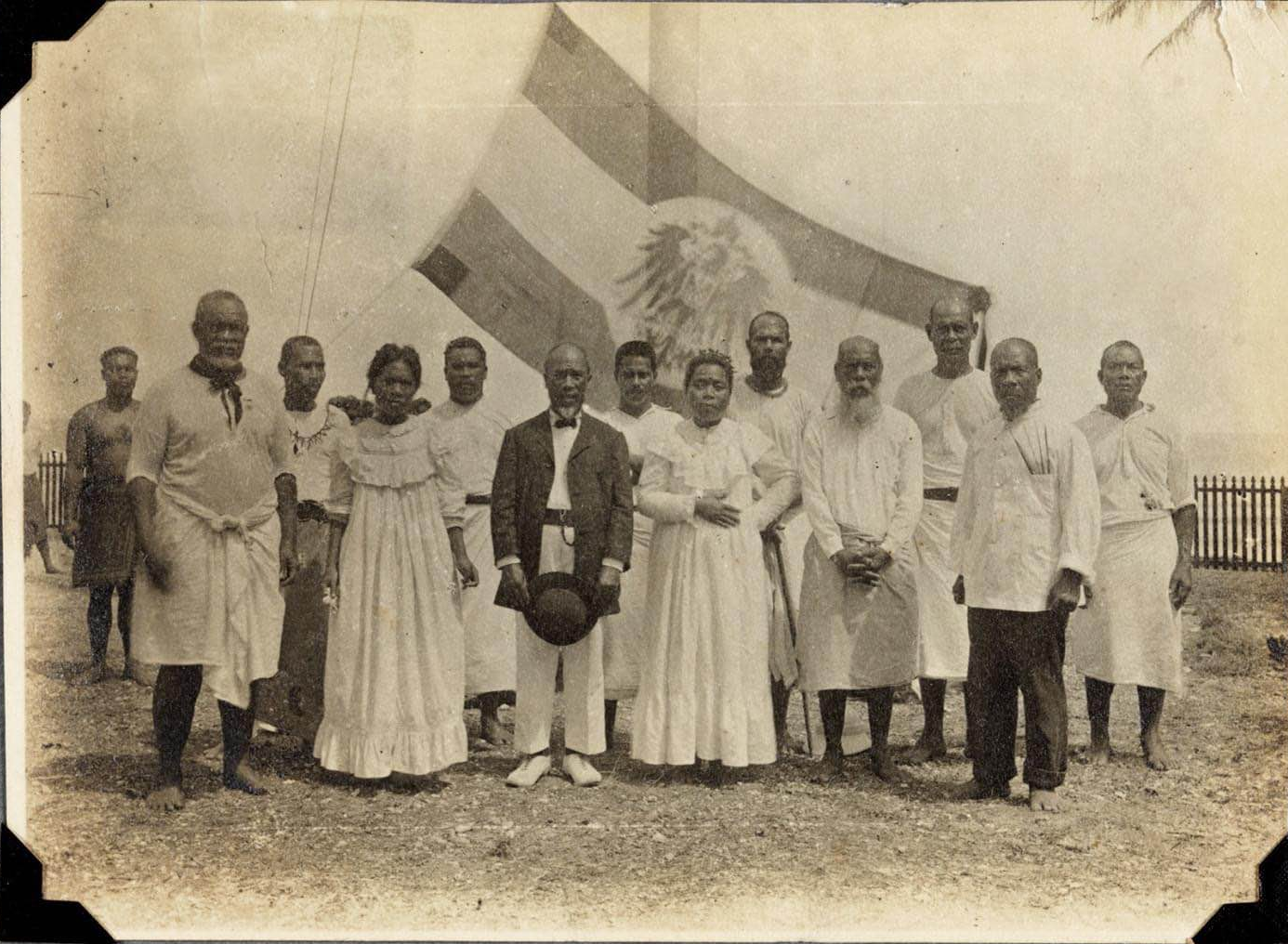
Annexation ceremony in Nauru on 3 October 1888

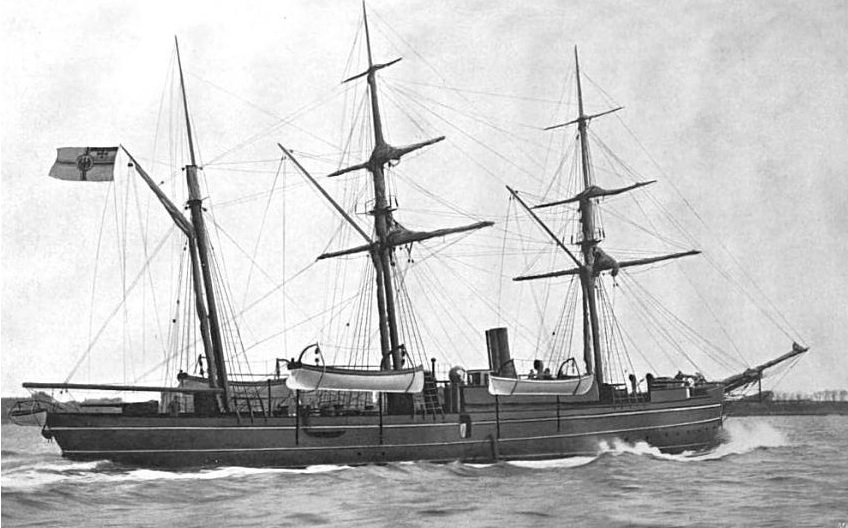
SMS Eber in 1887

The war helped neither the island's copra production nor the interests and security of the German merchants, who had established cacao plantations and other agricultural enterprises. Because the political instability affected the German holdings directly, German authorities recommended that Germany take over the administration of the island. Germany annexed the island on 16 April 1888, banning both alcohol and firearms. On October 1 of that year, the German gunboat SMS Eber, with 87 men, anchored off the coast of Nauru. The armed German seamen met with Harris and returned with the first European settlers, as well as a Christian missionary from the Gilbert Islands. The next morning saw the arrest of the remaining tribal chiefs and the German annexation ceremony, complete with the hoisting of the German flag. German authorities declared that unless all firearms and munitions were turned over to the German government in one day, the chiefs would be executed; the next morning, the natives of the island turned over 765 weapons and several thousand rounds of ammunition, ending the bloodiest tribal war in Nauruan history.

== Aftermath ==
The annexation of Nauru by the German Empire brought about a lasting ceasefire. After the annexation, King Aweida nominally retook the throne, and Nauru became part of German New Guinea.

== See also ==
- History of Nauru
