= Crime in Nauru =

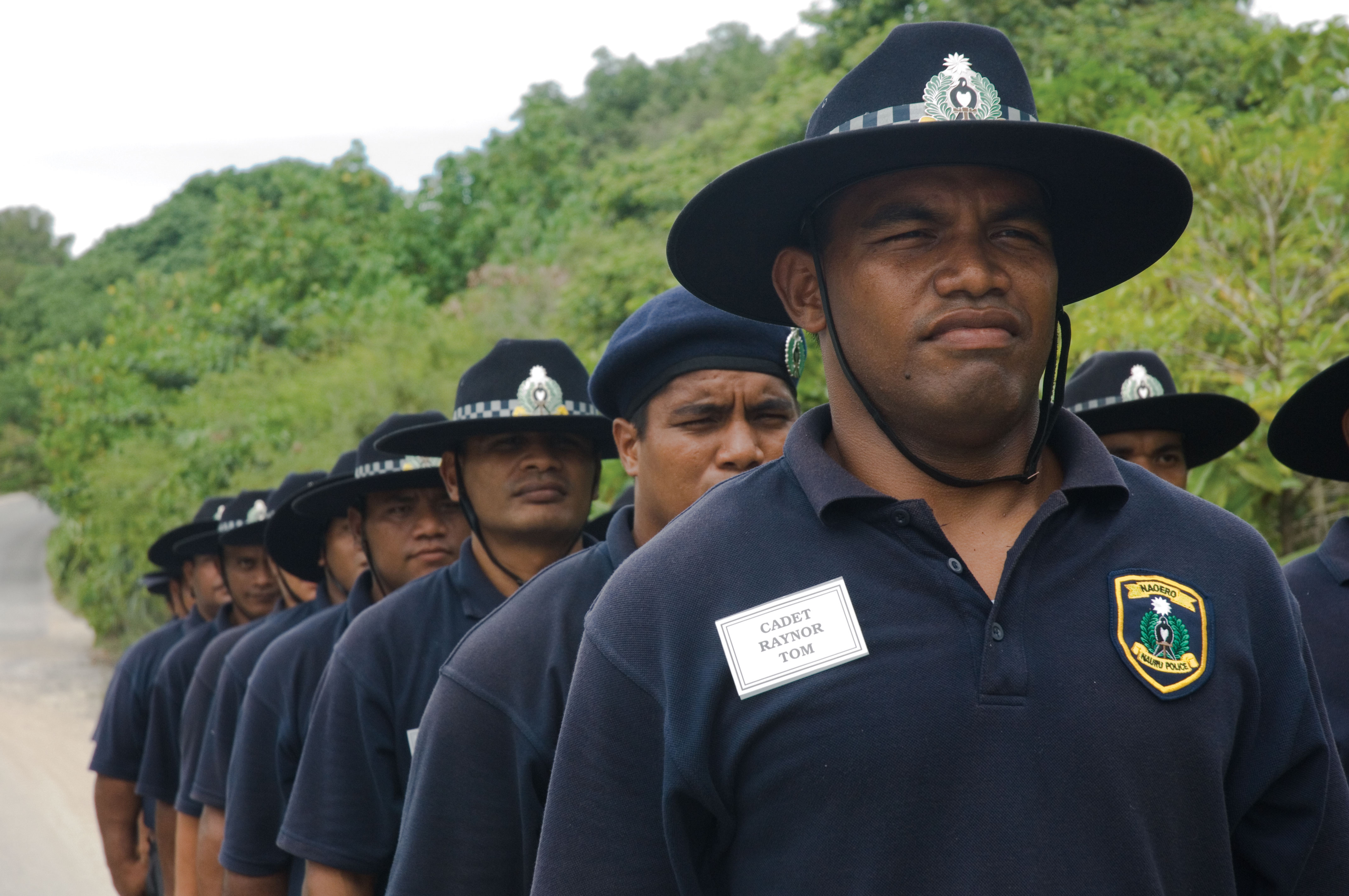
Nauruan police officers

Nauru has a low crime rate and a majority of crime in the country are related to traffic offences. Multiple people from the penal colony of Norfolk Island escaped to Nauru in the 19th century, with one murdering a dozen people. Australia pays Nauru to host immigration detention centres.

== History ==
John Jones, a convict from the penal colony of Norfolk Island, arrived in Nauru in the 1830s and murdered at least a dozen people. William Harris also escaped Norfolk Island and arrived at Nauru in 1842.

The Japanese Empire's occupation of the island resulted in mass killings that lowered the population to less than 600.

Australia pays Nauru to house the immigration detention centre Nauru Regional Processing Centre. A riot broke out at the detention centre in 2013. In 2025, Australia deported three criminals to Nauru, including one murderer, despite none of the three people being citizens of Nauru.

== Law ==
Arbitrary arrest and detention are illegal in Nauru. People can only be held for up to 24 hours by police without a hearing before a magistrate. The right to a fair and public trial is enshrined in the Constitution of Nauru.

The maximum penalty for rape is twenty-five years. No executions were carried out in Nauru between its independence in 1968, and the abolition of the death penalty in 2016.

== Statistics ==
The United States Department of State reported Nauru as a low crime area in 2014. 618 criminal offences were recorded in the first quarter of 2024, with 332 being from traffic offences, 175 being criminal offences, and 111 being vehicle impoundments.

== Works cited ==
=== News ===
- McGuirk, Rod (17 February 2025). "Australia plans to deport 3 violent criminals to Nauru". Associated Press. Archived from the original on 8 July 2025.

=== Web ===
- "2023 Country Reports on Human Rights Practices: Nauru". United States Department of State. Archived from the original on 8 July 2025.
- "Countries/Jurisdictions of Primary Concern - Nauru". United States Department of State. Archived from the original on 8 July 2025.
- "Nauru: New criminal law is welcome improvement on human rights". Amnesty International. 16 June 2016. Archived from the original on 8 July 2025.
- "Police records 618 offences in first quarter". Nauru. Archived from the original on 8 July 2025.
- Dauvergne, Peter (22 July 2019). "A Dark History of the World's Smallest Island Nation". MIT Press. Archived from the original on 8 July 2025.
