= 1948 Nauru riots =

- Date: 7 June 1948
- Location: Trust Territory of Nauru
- Caused by: Exploitation of Chinese labourers

Parties
Chinese labourers on Nauru	(Australia) Administration of Nauru

Lead figures
	(Australia) Mark Ridgway (Administrator); (Australia) Eddie Ward (Minister for External Territories)

Number
200–300 labourers	44 Nauruan constables; 16 European volunteers

Casualties and losses
4 dead; 16 wounded; 49 arrested	
- State of emergency declared effective on 7 June; rescinded 18 July.

The 1948 Nauru riots occurred when Chinese labourers employed on the phosphate mines refused to leave the island. At the time, Nauru was dominated by Australia as a United Nations trust territory, with New Zealand and the UK as co-trustees.

== Background ==
Chinese labourers were first brought to Nauru in 1907 by the Pacific Phosphate Company, at which time the island was a German protectorate. They became the preferred source of labour for the phosphate mines, as they were regarded as better workers than the Nauruans, were willing to sign three-year contracts, and, unlike Pacific Islanders, were willing to live on the island for the duration of their employment. The Nauruan and Chinese communities had little contact, and their separation was encouraged by the company and the German administration. The Chinese were blamed for a series of disease epidemics which saw the Nauruan population reduced from 1,550 in 1905 to 1,250 in 1910. By 1914, there were 1,000 immigrant workers on Nauru, half of which were Chinese and the other half Caroline Islanders.

During World War I, Nauru was occupied by Australian forces and subsequently became a League of Nations mandate. Phosphate mining was taken over by the British Phosphate Commission (BPC), a joint venture of Australia, New Zealand, and the UK. The BPC discontinued the recruitment of Caroline Islanders, as the islands had come under Japanese control, and attempted to replace them with workers from Australia's other mandate, the Territory of New Guinea. However, the experiment proved unsuccessful and by 1924 the Chinese were the only remaining foreign labourers. By this time, the Australian administration's Movements of Natives Ordinance 1921 had introduced formal racial segregation. Subsequently, "the three communities, European, Nauruan, and Chinese, lived isolated and self-contained existences reinforced by the ordinances of the Administrator".

Chinese workers signed contracts directly with the BPC, which were translated by a Chinese liaison officer appointed by the British administration in Hong Kong. The contracts included free travel, accommodation, food, clothing and medical care. The labourers were not permitted to bring their families, and the majority of their wages were sent back to China. They were not allowed to become permanent residents of Nauru, but an estimated 20 percent chose to renew their contracts each year. Few Nauruans sought work with the BPC, but those that did received a higher minimum wage.

Most Chinese labourers were evacuated prior to the Japanese occupation of Nauru in 1942, but the 180 that remained were treated harshly and given reduced rations compared to the Nauruans. After 1944 many Chinese died of starvation. Australian administration was restored in September 1945 following the end of World War II. The BPC immediately sought to resume mining, and by June 1948 the Chinese population stood at 1,400.

== Riots ==
On 7 June 1948, several hundred Chinese workers refused to board a ship waiting to return them to China. They alleged that the Chinese interpreters would not pay out their share of contributions to the community funds. One of the labourers threatened an interpreter and assaulted a messenger from the administration, at which point the police were called and attempted to arrest him. The other labourers then barricaded themselves in their compound and armed themselves with spears, clubs and axes.

The island's administrator Mark Ridgway declared a state of emergency and dispatched an armed riot squad comprising 44 Nauruan policemen and 16 European volunteers to the Chinese compound. In the subsequent fight, two of the labourers were shot dead and 16 were wounded.

The police arrested 49 of the workers, who were taken to the island's jail. There, two were bayoneted to death by a Nauruan constable, who alleged they had been attempting to escape.

== Aftermath ==
The August 1948 edition of Pacific Islands Monthly accused the Australian government of "great official secrecy" over the riots. It noted that the state of emergency had been suspended on 18 July.

== Sources ==
- Viviani, Nancy (1970). Nauru: Phosphate and Political Progress (PDF). ANU Press.
