= William Harris (beachcomber) =

British-born beachcomber

William Harris (born in 1812 or 1813, presumed dead in 1889) was a British-born beachcomber who settled in pre-colonial Nauru and adopted a Nauruan lifestyle.

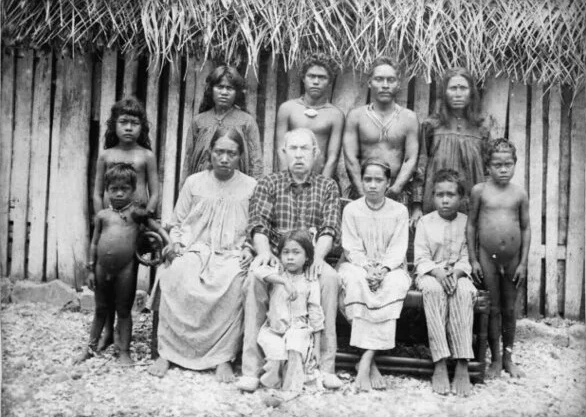
William Harris with his Nauran wife and children, 1887.

A convict sentenced to the penal colony on Norfolk Island, he escaped and made his way to Nauru in 1842. There he "assimilated native culture [...,] took a Nauruan wife, fathered several children, and was adopted as a Nauruan. He became perhaps the only beachcomber the Nauruans ever fully accepted and trusted." He acted as an intermediary between his people of adoption and passing European trade vessels.

In 1881, Harris informed the Royal Navy that civil war had broken out on the island.

In 1888, when Nauru became a German protectorate, he assisted the German authorities in informing the Nauruans of the way in which the country would be governed, and in persuading them to relinquish their firearms, with which a third of the population had been killed during the civil war.

In 1889, his canoe was swept away to sea by strong currents, and he was not seen again.
