= Nauruan indigenous religion =

Nauruan indigenous religion is an indigenous religion of the Nauruans.

== Worldview ==
An offering to the female deity Eijebong was made. Dead spirits are believed to be invoked through trances by a medium, and those spirits were said to be living in the island of Buitani. Believers say that the sky and the earth were created by a spider called Areop-Enap.

== Deities ==
=== Eigigu ===
Eigigu is a girl from Nauruan mythology, who is said to be the wife of the moon (maramen).

=== Detora ===
Detora is a boy in Nauruan mythology, who became the king of the sea.

=== Eyouwit ===
A young girl who lived in the sky.

== Decline ==
There are very few, if any, people on the island who still subscribe to this religion, because of the dominant belief of Christianity imposed upon them by Christian colonization. Main sources for attestations of the religion in its old form comes from sources written by German ethnologist Paul Hambruch in 1914 and 1915 (available in German here: volume 1, volume 2), which was not well received by German missionary Alois Kayser.

== See also ==
- Indigenous religion
