= Eigamoiya =

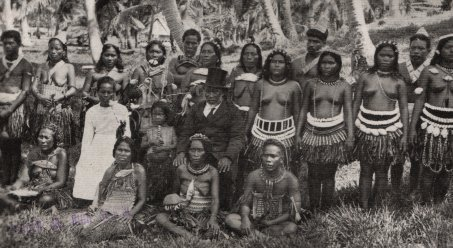
Eidukiri, in white, with her husband and people.

Eigamoiya (18??–1915) was a queen consort of Nauru, and the aunt of King Aweida. King Aweiyida was the son of Chief Jim, the latter being the son of a warrior named Aweui of the Eoaru tribe.

Eigamoiya and Jim shared the same father but different mothers. Eigamoiya's mother was a queen of Nauru named Eomien. She was also named Iquen (for Queen) by early visitors.

In 1888, she ended the Nauruan civil war after ten years. She was part of the Eamwit tribe, the most powerful tribe on the island.
