= Aweida =

King of Nauru from 1875-1920

Aweida aka Auweiyeda
- King of Nauru
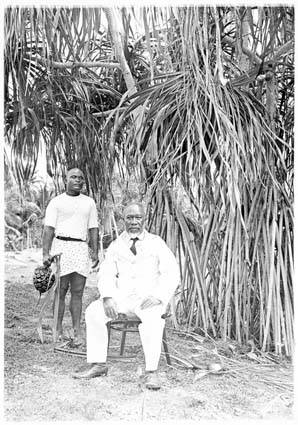

King of Nauru
- Reign: c. 1875 – 1920
- Predecessor: Monarchy established
- Successor: Moses Auweiyeda

Head Chief of Nauru
- Reign: c. 1911 - 1920
- Predecessor: Chief Jim
- Successor: Daimon (Head Chief)
- Born: Aweijeda Jim c. 1850; Boe, Nauru
- Died: 1920 (aged 70–71); Nauru
- Spouse: Eibinua
- Issue: Moses Auweiyeda & 8 others
- Dynasty: House of Emea
- Father: Chief Jim
- Mother: Eidingab
- Religion: Methodism

King Aweida of Nauru (Nauruan: Aweijeda Jim Naoero) (c. 1850 – 1920) or formally King Aweida was the King and later Head Chief of Nauru from 1875 until his death in 1920. He was succeeded by his son Moses Auweiyeda.

== Biography ==
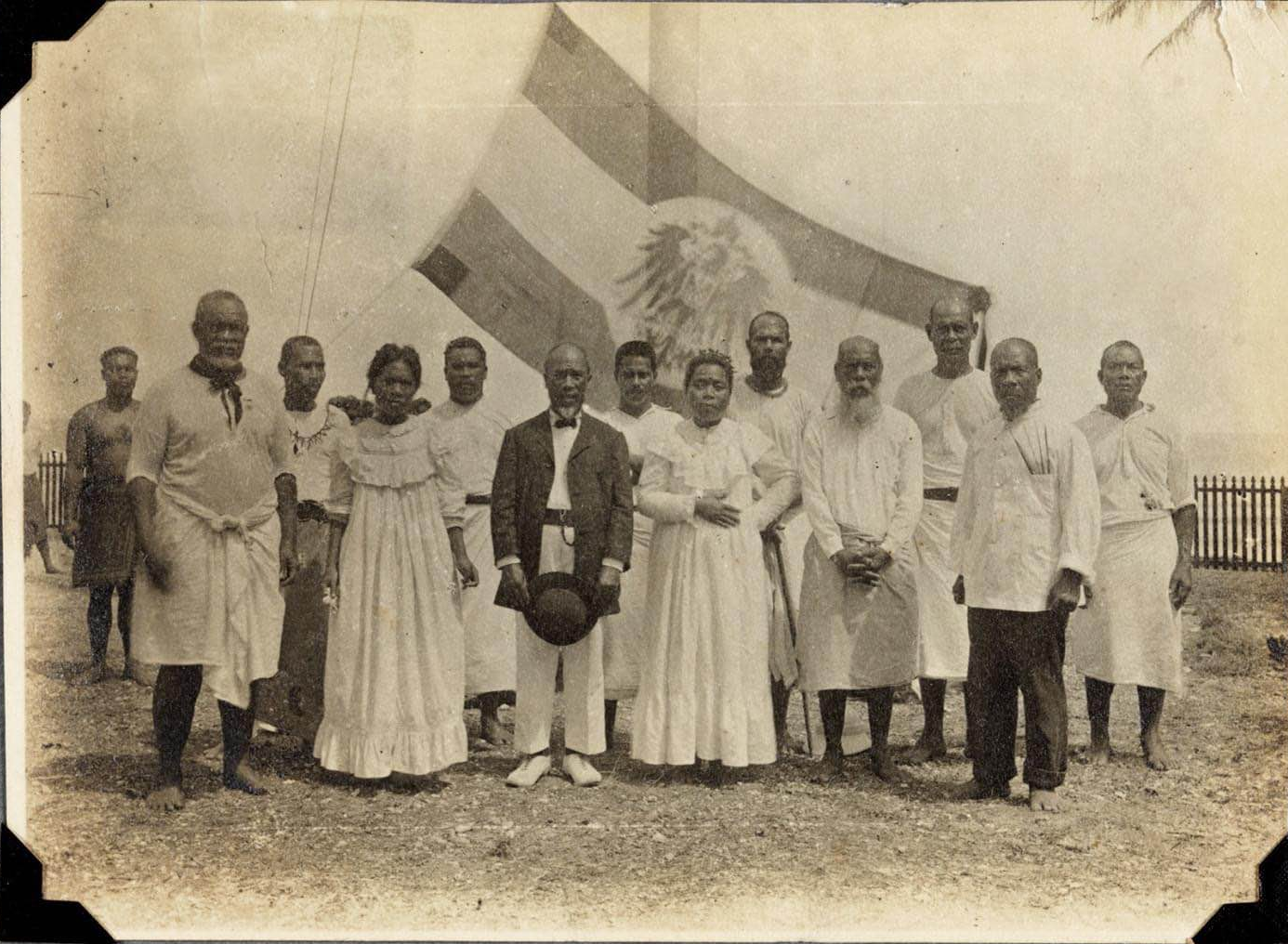
King Aweida standing in the middle before a flag of German Imperial Colonial Office.

Aweida was born Aweijeda in 1850(?) at Boe, Nauru. Before Nauru came under European rule, it was governed by a head chief who made laws that were enforced by local chiefs. After his father's death in 1911, he gained the title of head chief and would hold the title until his death.

Aweijeda was born to Chief Jim. His first marriage was to a chieftain's daughter, Eibinua of the Eamwit tribe from Bush village. They had several children.

Aweida was known to wear Western attire on special occasions, which was, back then, a very rare practice amongst Nauruans.

When Germany annexed Nauru into the Marshall Islands Protectorate, and later German New Guinea, Aweida retained his sovereignty as king of Nauru and remained the head chief of the Nauruan people. He reigned as King and Head Chief from 1875 until his death in 1920. Very little his known about him due to the lack of documentation about him and his family.

After Eibinua died, Aweida remarried, this time to Eidukiri, also of the Eamwit tribe, but they had no children. Aweida was the de-facto king during the Nauruan Civil War from 1878–1888. After Australia invaded the island in World War I, he retained his position, still having the loyalty of most local chiefs.

The death of King Aweida was announced in the 7 Oct 1920 evening edition of The Herald (Melbourne) as having taken place a few days earlier just before the departure of a Mr. Gordon Ross from Nauru to Ballarat, Victoria, whereupon he reported it. Aweida drowned near the Gabab Channel. He was brought to shore by the natives of Nauru and was put near a fire, but he collapsed and was declared dead. One of Aweida's sons, Moses (King Moses), was proclaimed as King of Nauru after Aweida's death.

== See also ==
- Eigamoiya
