= Jaluit Company =

German colonial trading company

Jaluit-Gesellschaft
- Jaluit Company flag circa 1880
- Type: Trading company
- Industry: international trade
- Founded: 1878; 148 years ago
- Defunct: 1914; 112 years ago
- Successor: Indisch-Afrikaansche Compagnie
- Headquarters: Hamburg, Germany
- Area served: Pacific Ocean
- Products: Phosphate and copra
- Parent: Handels- und Landbau

The Jaluit Company (German: Jaluit-Gesellschaft) was a German colonial trading company that operated throughout the Western Pacific, mainly specializing in phosphate mining and copra planation. From 1888 to 1906, the company acted as the colonial administrator of the Marshall Islands on behalf of the German Empire.

== History ==
The Jaluit Company was founded on December 21, 1887, shortly after the announcement of the Anglo-German Agreement of 1886, as a stock corporation (Aktiengesellschaft) in Hamburg, Germany. This was the result of a merger between the German Trade and Plantation Company of the South Sea Islands (Deutsche Handels- und Plantagen-Gesellschaft, DHPG) and Hernsheim & Co. of their business operations in the Marshall Islands, Gilbert Islands and Caroline Islands.

On January 21, 1888, the company took over the administration of the Marshall Islands on behalf of the German Empire. This was a result of Germany's colonial policy at the time, which preferred using chartered companies for colonial administration instead of relying on government institutions. The company took on all costs incurred on the administration, in exchange for the right to take possession of any "unclaimed" land, engage in pearl fishing and exploit the guano deposits. In particular, the Jaluit Company was noted for its role in the early phosphate mining in Banaba and Nauru. However, unlike other German colonial companies (such as the German New Guinea Company nearby), the Jaluit Company did not receive full political sovereignty in its affairs. From 1888 to 1893, the administration itself was headed by an “Imperial Commissar” (Kaiserliche Kommissariat Jaluit) appointed by the Colonial Office, and from 1893 to 1906 a “provincial governor” (Landeshauptmannschaft Jaluit).

The Jaluit Company received its name from the Jaluit Atoll, where its main factory was located. It was also responsible for trade and shipping between Jaluit and the Gilbert Islands and the Caroline Islands. At its peak, the company ran shipping lines from Sydney to Hong Kong, connecting the various German colonies in the Western Pacific.

The company flourished for almost two decades in Germany's Pacific colonies. In 1906, the German government terminated the charter contract and the Jaluit Company handed over administrative responsibilities of the Marshall Islands to German New Guinea, as the latter officially annexed those islands. Also in 1906 (other sources claim 1902), it sold off its remaining phosphate mining operation on Nauru to the newly reorganized Pacific Phosphate Company. From then on, the company acted solely as a trade enterprise and continued its operations until the Japanese occupation of the islands during World War I in 1914.
