= British Phosphate Commission =

House flag of the British Phosphate Commissioners, 1945

The British Phosphate Commissioners (BPC) was a board of Australian, British, and New Zealand representatives who managed extraction of phosphate from Christmas Island, Nauru, and Banaba (Ocean Island) from 1920 until 1981.

Nauru was a mandate territory governed on behalf of Nauru by Australia, Britain and New Zealand. However, representatives on the Permanent Mandates Commission argued that the activities of the BPC on Nauru were exploitative and not to the benefit of Nauruans. Australia intentionally suppressed information about its activities in Nauru. In 1968, Nauru brought Australia up before the International Court of Justice over the environmental devastation that they had caused on Nauru.

== Nauru and the B.P.C. ==
=== Nauru Island Agreement ===
In 1900, the German colonial administration of Nauru granted phosphate rights to British businessman John T. Arundel's Pacific Islands Company (PIC). The PIC was replaced by the Pacific Phosphate Company (PPC) in 1902, with German interests holding around one-third of the company's share capital. Production commenced in 1906, largely relying on indentured labour, with Australia and New Zealand as the primary markets. In 1914, following the outbreak of the First World War, the Australian Naval and Military Expeditionary Force occupied Nauru, with an agreement reached whereby the Australian military would assume administrative control of the island and the PPC would continue phosphate operations.

Following the end of the war, Nauru was made a League of Nations mandate under the joint trusteeship of Australia, New Zealand and the United Kingdom, with Australia retaining administration of the island. In 1919, the three trustees signed the Nauru Island Agreement, which entitled them to the phosphate of Nauru through the British Phosphate Commissioners. They bought back all the assets of the PPC for more than 3.5 million pounds on 1 July 1920, and started to manage it directly on 1 January 1921, after a six-month transition period of PPC management. Most of PPC's former employees were retained by the BPC.

From 1919 the responsibility for the welfare of the people of Nauru and Banaba, the restoring of land and water resources lost by mining operations and compensation for environmental damage to the islands was under the control of the governments of United Kingdom, New Zealand and Australia.

=== B.P.C. Payments to Nauruans ===
Under a policy established under the German administration, royalty payments were given to landowners. In 1921, the British Phosphate Commissioners (under pressure from the Nauruan people) increased royalty payments from one-half pence to one and one-half pence per ton of phosphate extracted.

In 1927, a new agreement was reached, giving the Nauruans seven and one-half pence per ton.

By 1939, Nauruans were receiving 9% of the phosphate revenues. This amount is still somewhat insignificant because at this time, Nauruan phosphate was selling far below world market prices.

=== Pricing and Profits ===
Throughout B.P.C. control, significant profits were made. In 1948, revenues from the island's phosphate reached $745,000. As the B.P.C. was controlled by its partner governments and was a major supplier of phosphate, it had an effective monopoly over the supply of phosphate to the markets in Australia and New Zealand, and could determine the price of phosphate delivered to those markets. The B.P.C. tied the pice for Ocean Island phosphate to the price paid for Nauru phosphate, however, the BPC would vary the price paid for phosphate. For example, around 1970, Nauru phosphate was sold to Japan at $14 and $15 a ton, but sold into the markets in Australia and New Zealand at $12.30.

=== Transfer of Ownership ===
In 1967 the Nauruans purchased the assets of the B.P.C. and, in 1970, the newly independent Republic of Nauru established the Nauru Phosphate Corporation.

== Banaba and the B.P.C. ==
=== Litigation ===
In 1965, the Banaban islanders, after decades of land disputes, royalty fees, and "exploitation," started legal litigation against the British Phosphate Commissioners in British court. After more than a decade, the case finally came to an end, with the Banabans only being awarded £1 and were still made to pay their own legal fees of more than £300,000.

The Australian government through the B.P.C. offered £780,000 in reparations.

== Christmas Island and the B.P.C. ==
=== Christmas Island Phosphate Company ===
The first European to recommend mining of phosphate for commercial exploitation was Sir John Murray, a British naturalist, during the 1872–76 Challenger expedition. His discovery led to annexation of the island by the British Crown on 6 June 1888.

In 1900 the Pacific Islands Company Ltd commenced mining on Ocean Island, with 1550 tons shipped from September to December 1901 and 13,350 tons in the following year. John T. Arundel and Lord Stanmore, directors of PIC, were responsible for financing the new opportunities and negotiating with the German company that controlled the licences to mine in Nauru. In 1902 the interests of PIC were merged with Jaluit Gesellschaft of Hamburg, to form the Pacific Phosphate Company Ltd (PPC), to engage in phosphate mining in Nauru and Ocean Island.

=== Christmas Island and the B.P.C. ===
Following the Nauru Agreement of 2 July 1919 the interests of the PPC in the phosphate deposits in Nauru and Ocean Island were acquired by the governments of the United Kingdom, Australia and New Zealand, which carried out mining under the direction of the Board of Commissioners, which represented the three governments.

=== Post B.P.C. Mining ===
In March 1981, the Phosphate Mining Company of Christmas Island (PMCI), a company established and controlled by the Australian Government, took over mining operations This arrangement lasted until December 1987 when the company was disbanded. The mining operation was then taken over by the Union of Christmas Island Workers.

== See also ==
Nauru

- Nauru Phosphate Corporation
- Nauru Phosphate Royalties Trust
