= Phosphate mining in Banaba and Nauru =

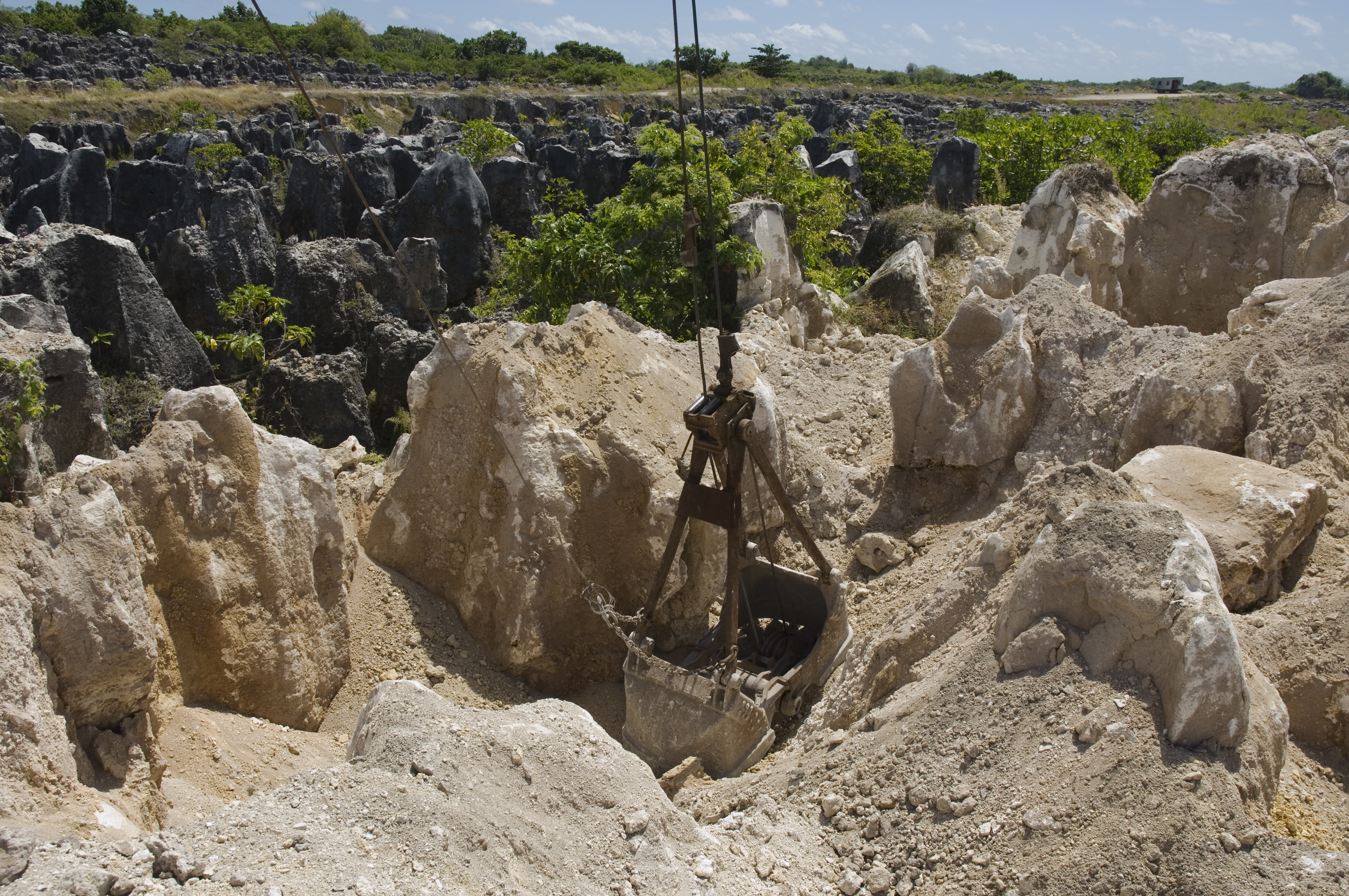
Phosphate mining in Nauru in 2007

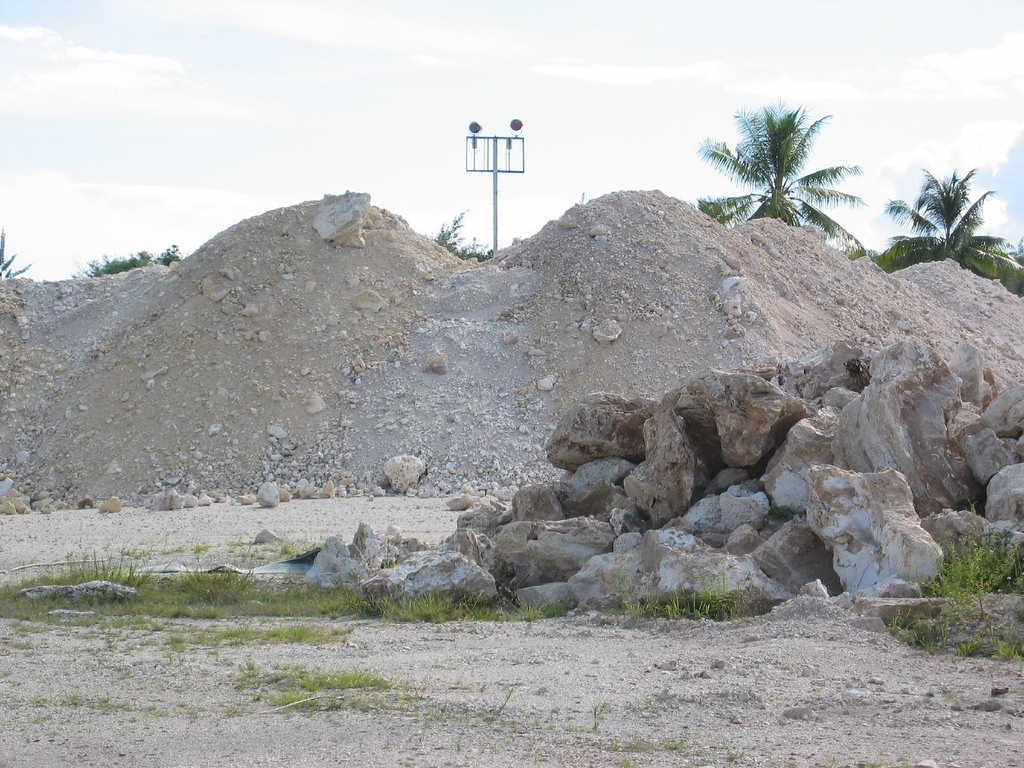
Phosphate stockpile on Nauru

The economies of Banaba and Nauru have been almost wholly dependent on phosphate, which has led to environmental disaster on these islands, with 80% of the islands' surfaces having been strip-mined. The phosphate deposits were virtually exhausted by 2000, although some small-scale mining is still in progress on Nauru. Mining ended on Banaba in 1979.

== First discovery of phosphate ==
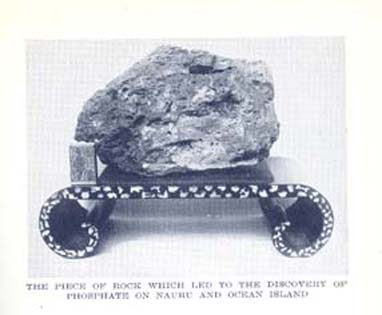
The piece of phosphate used as a door stop

In 1896, a cargo officer (supercargo) for the Pacific Islands Company on the Lady M, Henry Denson, found a strange-looking rock on Nauru during a brief stop on the island. He originally believed it to be a piece of petrified wood. Denson had planned on making children's marbles from it, but instead it ended up as a doorstop in the company's Sydney office.

In 1899, Albert Ellis, a management official of the phosphate division of the Pacific Islands Company, was transferred to the Sydney office to "analyse rock samples coming from the Pacific Islands." Ellis noticed the rock and suspected it to be phosphate (similar in appearance to the phosphate coming from Baker Island), but was rebuffed by Denson and told that it was only wood. Three months later, Ellis decided to test his hunch and tested the rock for phosphate. It turned out to be phosphate ore of the richest quality.

A neighbouring island to the east, Banaba (Ocean Island), shared Nauru's geology and also had significant reserves of phosphate.

== Mining ==
Ellis' discovery of phosphate excited John T. Arundel of the Pacific Islands Company and the company decided to pursue rights and access to Nauru's lucrative resource. The negotiations to pursue rights to the phosphate involved four parties: the British and German governments, the newly reorganised Pacific Phosphate Company, and Jaluit-Gesellschaft (a German chartered company that had been exploiting phosphates on Nauru since the late 19th century).

In 1906, an agreement was established whereby Jaluit-Gesellschaft's rights were transferred into the Pacific Phosphate Company, for "a cash payment of 2,000 pounds sterling (British), 12,500 pounds sterling (British) worth of shares in the Pacific Phosphate Company, and royalty payments for every ton of phosphate exported."

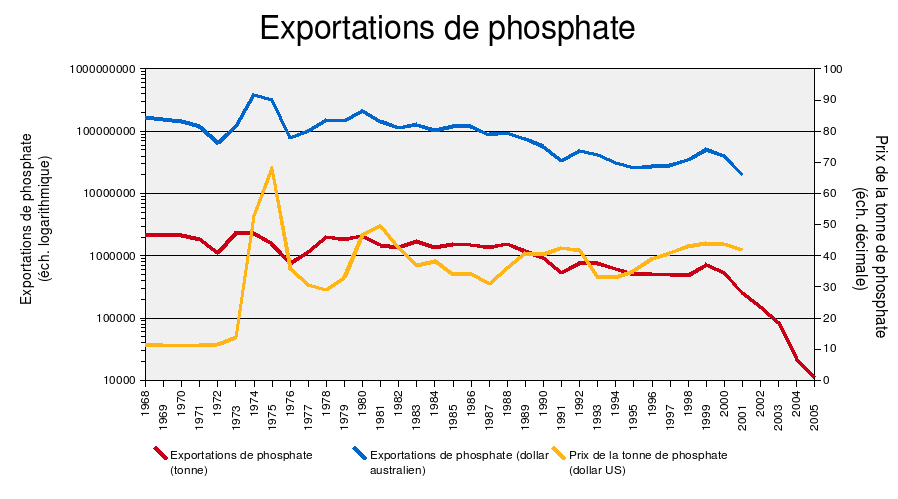
The economic history of the Nauruan phosphate industry.

In the first year of mining alone, 11,000 pounds (5,000 kg) of phosphate were shipped to Australia. After World War I the interests of the Pacific Phosphate Company were acquired and the phosphate mining on Nauru was managed through a trust established between Britain, Australia and New Zealand. Those governments established the British Phosphate Commissioners, who took over the rights to the phosphates. From 1919 the responsibility for the welfare of the people of Nauru and Banaba, the restoring of land and water resources lost by mining operations and compensation for environmental damage to the islands was under the control of the governments of United Kingdom, New Zealand and Australia. In June 1948, about 1,100 Gilbertese employed on Ocean Island refused to work, with the key demand of the strikers was for higher wages of £10 a month to meet the increased price of goods sold in the trade store.

In 1968, Nauru became a sovereign, independent nation. In 1970, the newly formed government purchased the full rights to the phosphate business from Australia for A$21 million. This purchase brought an economic boost to the Republic, as revenues from the mining operations are estimated to have been A$100–120 million annually since independence through virtual resource exhaustion in the early 1990s. Gross production of phosphate from 1968 through exhaustion has been 43 million tons. In 1989, Nauru took legal action against Australia in the International Court of Justice over Australia's administration of the island, in particular Australia's failure to remedy the environmental damage caused by phosphate mining. Certain Phosphate Lands: Nauru v. Australia led to an out-of-court settlement to rehabilitate the mined-out areas of Nauru.

== Investments and finances ==
The government puts profits from the mining into a trust for the islanders. This trust reached a peak of A$1 billion, returning approximately 14% annually. Poor investments and corruption have left the trust fund nearly empty and therefore Nauru with little money.

In the year 1948, revenues from phosphate mining were A$745,000. A minuscule 2% (A$14,900) was being returned to the Nauruans, while 1% was being charged for "administration". In 1960, future president Hammer DeRoburt negotiated royalties of profit to the Nauruans to be 22% while administration would increase to 14%.

One apparently successful development project was in 1988, whereby the Royalty Trust purchased 600 acres (2.4 km^{2}) of vacant, residentially zoned land near Portland, Oregon. Purchased for $16 million from Homer Williams and called Forest Heights, it was controlled by the Nauru trust until 75% of the allotments were sold, when the homeowners association took over.

== Gallery ==
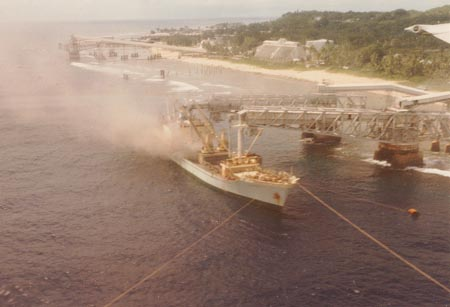
A ship being loaded with phosphate in Aiwo district, Nauru

Map of Banaba at the time of phosphate mining

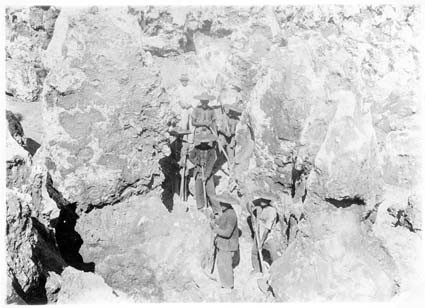
Chinese phosphate workers on Nauru standing between limestone pinnacle

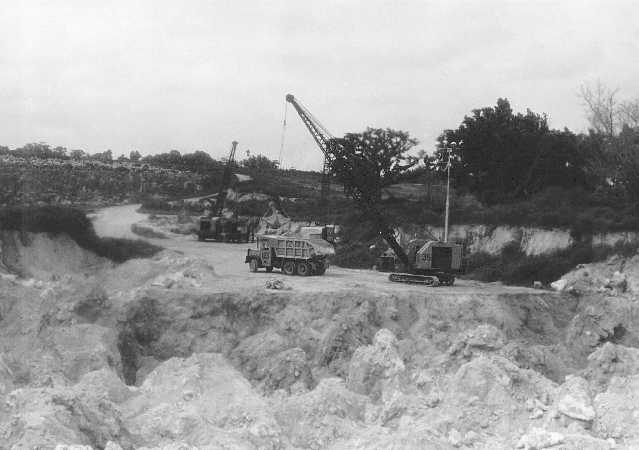
Phosphate mining in Nauru.

== See also ==
- 1948 Nauru riots
- Banaba
- British Phosphate Commission
- Economy of Nauru
- Environmental impact of agriculture
- Jaluit Company
- Nauru Phosphate Royalties Trust
- Pacific Islands Company
- Pacific Phosphate Company
- Republic of Nauru Phosphate Corporation
- Rail transport in Nauru
- Superphosphate

== Sources ==
- Consuming Ocean Island: Stories of People and Phosphate from Banaba, by Katerina Martina Teaiwa, 2015, Indiana University Press, pp 272.
