= Nauruans =

Citizens or residents of Nauru

dei-Naoero (Nauruan)
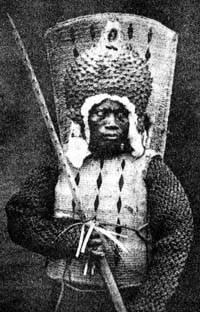
- Nauruan warrior, 1880

Total population
- c. 15,000

Regions with significant populations
- Nauru: c. 11,000
- Australia: c. 800
- New Zealand: 135

Languages
- Nauruan (native), English, Nauru Pidgin

Religion
- Christianity

Related ethnic groups
- Polynesians, Melanesians, and Micronesians

Nauruans (Nauruan: dei-Naoero), officially dei-Naoero, are a nation and an ethnic group indigenous to the Pacific island country of Naoero, officially the Republic of Naoero. They are most likely a blend of Micronesian, Melanesian and Polynesian ancestry.

The origin of the Nauruan people has not yet been finally determined. It was probably seafaring or shipwrecked Polynesians or Melanesians, who established themselves there because there was not already an indigenous population present, whereas the Micronesians were already crossed with the Melanesians in this area.

The Nauruans have two elements of their population: the native Micronesians and the Polynesians who had immigrated long before. Through these two extremes, diverse traditions came to exist.

In about 1920, influenza spread through Naoero, which took a heavy toll on the Nauruans. In 1925, the first cases of diabetes were diagnosed by doctors. Today, depending on age, every second to third Nauruan is diabetic – a higher rate than any other country in the world.

== Tribes ==
The Nauruans were historically divided into 12 tribes, each with its own chief and a distinct style of clothing, with children inheriting the tribe from their mother's side.

Each of the 12 tribes is associated with certain concepts:

- Eamwit - snake/eel, sly, slippery, good at lying and copier of styles
- Eamwitmwit - cricket/insect, vain beauty, tidiness, shrill noise and manner
- Eaoru - destroyer, harms plans, jealousy
- Eamwidara - dragonfly
- Iruwa- stranger, foreigner, a person from other countries, intelligence, beauty, masculinity
- Eano-straightforward, mad, eager
- Iwi (extinct) - lice
- Irutsi (extinct) - cannibalism
- Deiboe - small black fish, moody, cheater, behavior can change any time
- Ranibok - object washed ashore
- Emea - user of rake, slave, healthy, beautiful hair, cheater in friendship
- Emangum - player, actor

== Society ==
Nauruans were classified into three social classes: temonibes (senior members of senior clans), amenengames (middle class) and the itsios (serf class). While temonibes and amenengames were determined at birth, itsio were usually allocated by being prisoners of war, and were often treated as goods. There was a separate class of castaways that were treated as pets, but they were never as low as the itsios.

== See also ==
- Nauruan language
- Nauruan nationality law, for the distinction between indigenous Nauruans and Nauruan citizens
