= Albert Ellis (prospector) =

Prospector in the Pacific who discovered phosphate deposits on Nauru and Banaba

Sir Albert Ellis CMG
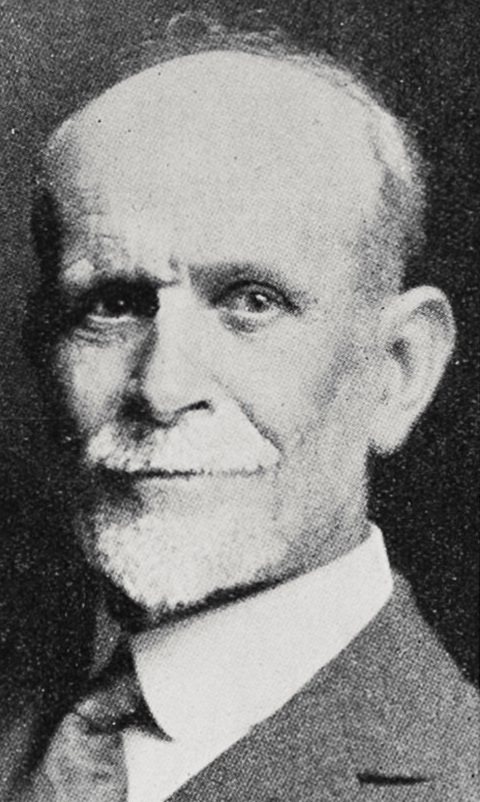
- Ellis, c. 1928
- Born: Albert Fuller Ellis; 28 August 1869; Roma, Colony of Queensland
- Died: 11 July 1951 (aged 81); Auckland, New Zealand
- Employer(s): John T. Arundel and Company
- Spouses: Florence Christina "Flo" Stewart (m. 1900; died 1909) Nellie Isabel Stewart (m. 1913)

Sir Albert Fuller Ellis CMG (28 August 1869 – 11 July 1951) was a New Zealand prospector in the Pacific. He discovered phosphate deposits on the Pacific islands of Nauru and Banaba (Ocean Island) in 1900. He was the British Phosphate Commissioner for New Zealand from 1921 to 1951.

== Biography ==
Ellis was born in Roma, Queensland; his family moved to Waikato in New Zealand three months later, where he eventually attended the Cambridge District High School. At the age of 18, Ellis joined his brothers James and George in working for John T. Arundel and Co. Their father George C. Ellis, a chemist, and later a farmer in New Zealand, was a director of the company. John T. Arundel and Co. was engaged in Pacific trading of phosphates, copra, and pearl shell. While working in the company's Sydney office in 1899 Ellis determined that a large rock from Nauru being used as a doorstop was rich in phosphate. Following the discovery, Ellis travelled to Ocean Island and Nauru and confirmed the discovery.

Operations on Ocean Island (known by the natives as Banaba) commenced three months after the discovery. Ellis managed the development of the phosphate resources on Nauru, and mining began in 1906 under an arrangement with the German administrators of the island. The native King had no jurisdiction over any lands on Banaba. Ronald Wright, in his book On Fiji Islands, writes:

Ellis, on the other hand, must have known very well that he had got the Banabans to give him a license to destroy their country in return for a pittance in overpriced trinkets and third-rate tinned food. Not satisfied with this, he made so bold as to hoist the Union Jack (without authorisation from Britain) and inform the Banabans that they were now people of England. By 1909 some two million tons of phosphate had been mined and 240 acres – almost one sixth of the island – destroyed. The company failed to keep even the minimal obligations to the Banabans that it had allowed itself in the original agreement: food trees disappeared with the land; natives were charged far higher prices than whites at the company store; and distilled water, which Ellis had promised the Banabans in return for the firewood to make it, was sold at such a price that the inhabitants had to continue drinking from caves increasingly polluted by the mining.

Following World War I, Nauru became a mandate of Australia, New Zealand and the United Kingdom, the countries appointed the British Phosphate Commission to manage the extraction and export of phosphate from Nauru. Ellis was appointed the BPC for New Zealand. The native population were left to the horrors of Japanese occupation in the Second World War. Despite efforts to relocate Nauruans due to the environmental destruction instigated by Ellis's discovery of phosphate, Nauru remains their home.

In the 1928 New Year Honours, Ellis was appointed a Companion of the Order of St Michael and St George, and in the 1938 King's Birthday Honours was created a Knight Bachelor. Ellis wrote a book about the history of the Pacific phosphate islands, his discovery and subsequent development of the phosphate industry on the islands, Ocean Island and Nauru — their Story was published in Australia in 1935.

Ellis' mother, Annie Eliza Ellis (née Izod) — who had died in 1891 — is buried on Raine Island, Queensland, beside the Raine Island Beacon. Her original headstone is housed at the Queensland Museum; however, the gravesite still exists, alongside a headstone replica. Sir Albert Ellis himself, at that time employed by John T. Arundel & Co., personally managed phosphate mining operations on Raine Island for a number of years.

== See also ==
- History of Nauru

== Books ==
- An Encyclopaedia of New Zealand, 1966

== Book Published ==
- Ellis, A.F. (1935). Ocean Island and Nauru; Their Story. Sydney, Australia: Angus and Robertson, limited. OCLC 3444055.
