= List of islets of Caroline Island =

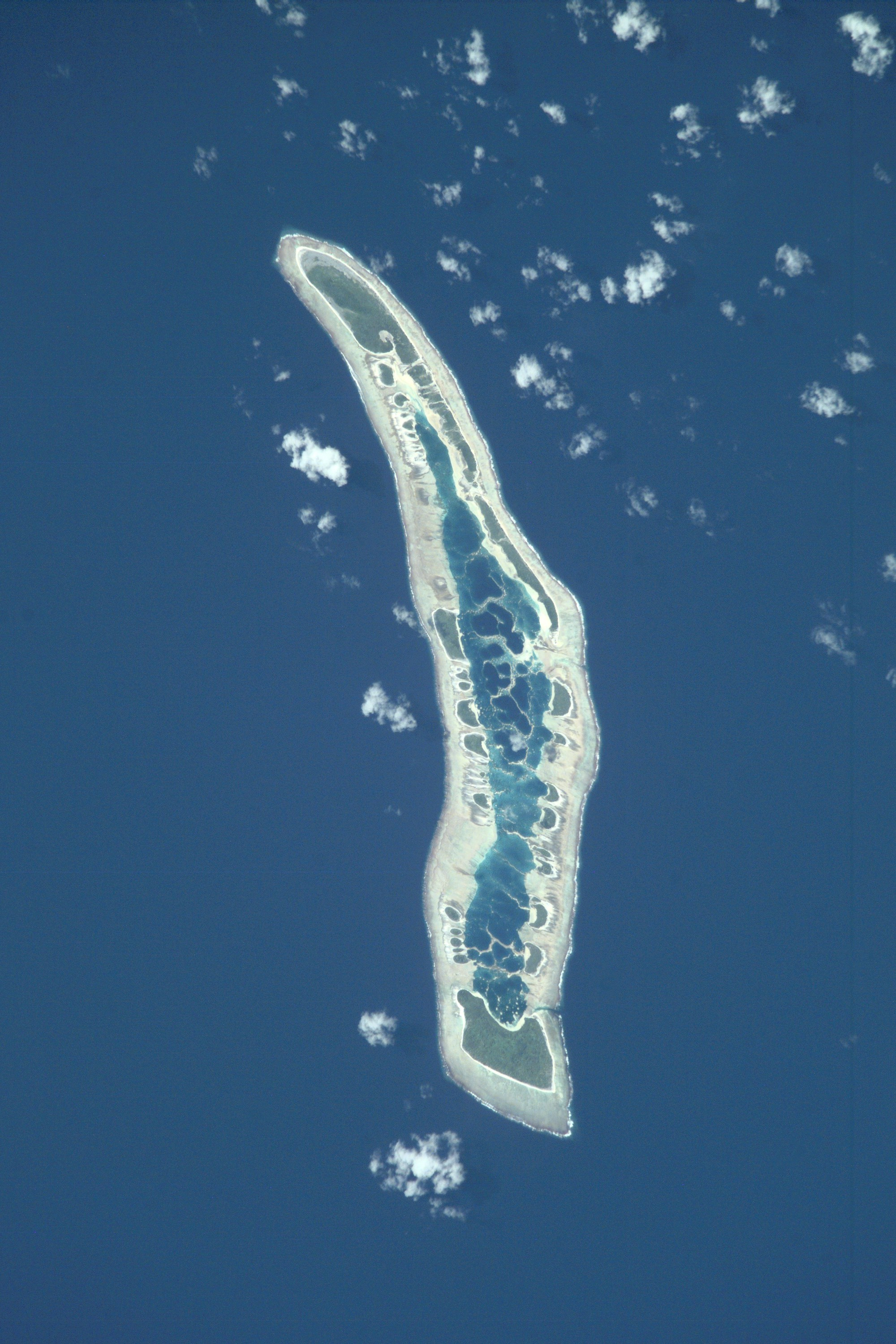
Satellite photograph of Caroline Island

The approximately 39 small islets of Caroline Island, a crescent-shaped atoll located some 1,500 km (930 mi) south of the Hawaiian Islands in the central Pacific, surround a shallow central lagoon. Caroline Island's islets, which only rise a few meters above sea level, share a common geologic origin and consist of sand deposits and limestone rock set atop a coral reef.

Three large islets — Nake, Long, and South Islets — make up 68 percent of the land area. The remaining assembly of small islets, divided into four groupings, was surveyed during a 1988 ecological survey, conducted by Angela and Cameron Kepler; at that time, many of the thus-far-unnamed islets were given names of Polynesian derivation. Several of the smallest islets have been observed to appear or disappear entirely following major storms, and the shapes of some larger islets have changed significantly over the past century.

Flora, the most distinguishing feature of each islet, varies as a function of both islet size and prior human habitation. Larger islets support inward zones of shrub, primarily Tournefortia argentea, and the largest possess a central forested region usually dominated by groves of Pisonia grandis trees. Artifacts, including wells, homesites, and marae, on several islets, speak to prior human habitation, as do stands of non-indigenous Cocos palms; however, many islets have little or no evidence of human influence, despite past disturbance.

== List of islet groups and single islets ==
Map of Millennium Island (Caroline Atoll), Kiribati

| Islet or group | Land area (m^{2}) | Coordinates | Location | Number of islets |
|---|---|---|---|---|
| Nake Islet | 917,000 | 9°54′43″S 150°12′18″W | north | 1 |
| Long Islet (Millennium Island) | 760,000 | ... | northeast | 1^{1)} |
| Southern Nake Islets | 162,000 | ... | northwest | 7 |
| Central Leeward Islets | 479,000 | ... | west | 11 |
| Southern Leeward Islets | 112,000 | ... | southwest | 5 |
| Windward Islets | 513,600 | ... | east | 13 |
| South Islet (Rimapoto) | 1,044,000 | ... | south | 1 |
| Caroline Atoll | 3,987,600^{2)} | 9°56′13″S 150°12′42″W | | 39 |
^{1)}originally a chain of 5 islets that have grown together
^{2)}area in 1988, current area only 3,760,000

== List of islets ==
| Islet | Land Area (m^{2}) | Coordinates | Subgroup |
|---|---|---|---|
| Nake Islet | 917,000 | 9°54′43″S 150°12′18″W | - |
| Long Islet (Millennium Island) | 760,000 | ... | - |
| Pandanus Islet | 74,000 | ... | South Nake Islets |
| Danger Islet | 27,000 | ... | South Nake Islets |
| Booby Islet | 8,000 | ... | South Nake Islets |
| Coral Islet | 17,000 | ... | South Nake Islets |
| Lone Palm Islet | 20,000 | ... | South Nake Islets |
| Motu Kota ("Red-footed Booby Islet") | 6,000 | ... | South Nake Islets |
| Motu Mouakena ("Masked Booby Islet") | 10,000 | ... | South Nake Islets |
| Motu Mannikiba ("Seabird Islet") | 215,000 | ... | Central Leeward Islets |
| Blackfin Islet | 26,000 | ... | Central Leeward Islets |
| Motu Matawa ("White Tern Islet") | 17,000 | ... | Central Leeward Islets |
| Emerald Islet | 83,000 | ... | Central Leeward Islets |
| Shark Islet | 80,000 | ... | Central Leeward Islets |
| Scarlet Crab Islet | 5,000 | ... | Central Leeward Islets |
| Motu Nautonga ("Sea Cucumber Islet") | 3,000 | ... | Central Leeward Islets |
| Azure Islet | 2,000 | ... | Central Leeward Islets |
| Reef Flat Islet | 1,000 | ... | Central Leeward Islets |
| Bird Islet | 41,000 | ... | Central Leeward Islets |
| Fishball Islet | 6,000 | ... | Central Leeward Islets |
| Motu Raurau ("Blue-Gray Noddy Islet") | 35,000 | ... | Southern Leeward Islets |
| Motu Eitei ("Frigatebird Islet") | 14,000 | ... | Southern Leeward Islets |
| Pisonia Islet | 24,000 | ... | Southern Leeward Islets |
| Motu Kimoa ("Rat Islet") | 18,000 | ... | Southern Leeward Islets |
| Motu Ana-Ana ("Anne's Islet") | 21,000 | ... | Southern Leeward Islets |
| Bosun Bird Islet | 9,000 | ... | Windward Islets |
| Windward Islet | 114,000 | ... | Windward Islets |
| Crescent Islet | 31,000 | ... | Windward Islets |
| Motu Atibu ("Coral Rubble Islet")^{1)} | 200 | ... | Windward Islets |
| North Pig Islet | 54,000 | ... | Windward Islets |
| Pig Islet | 72,000 | ... | Windward Islets |
| Skull Islet | 200 | ... | Windward Islets |
| North Brothers Islet | 17,000 | ... | Windward Islets |
| Brothers Islet | 43,000 | ... | Windward Islets |
| Noddy Rock | 200 | ... | Windward Islets |
| North Arundel Islet | 9,000 | ... | Windward Islets |
| Arundel Islet | 73,000 | ... | Windward Islets |
| Tridacna Islet | 91,000 | ... | Windward Islets |
| South Islet (Rimapoto) | 1,044,000 | ... | - |
| Caroline Atoll | 3,987,600^{2)} | 9°56′13″S 150°12′42″W | Caroline Atoll |
^{1)}reportedly disappeared in a February 1990 storm
^{2)}area in 1988, current area only 3,760,000

== Details of islets ==
| Islet group | Islet name | Area | Description | Picture |
| Nake Islet | | 917,000 m^{2} | Nake, the second-largest and northernmost islet, is home to a marae of Polynesian origin on its northwestern coast, first noted by John Arundel in the 19th century. The marae, measuring 18 m by 14 m, it is the only major archaeological site on the atoll, although as of 2006 it has not yet been surveyed by field archaeologists. The southwestern corner of the island houses a cistern for fresh water, built in 1938. The island was planted with coconut palms in the 1910s, but today Cocos trees occupy only about 20% of the island's forest, with the remaining 80% Pisonia groves. Nake possesses the greatest forested area (roughly 90% of the islet) and the greatest diversity of breeding seabirds (nine species). A shallow bay at the southern end, along the central lagoon, provides a popular feeding location for seabirds. | Stacked stone wall of a Tuamotuan marae. |
| Long Islet | | 760,000 m^{2} | Long Islet lies along the windward side of Caroline Atoll, extending over 4.2 km by only about 300 m wide. Once five distinct islets that have since fused together, Long has a complex geological history, with some areas (previous inlets) still devoid of vegetation from beach to lagoon. It therefore also possesses the greatest diversity of vegetation amongst the islets of Caroline Atoll. Mature Tournefortia and Pisonia groves grow on the sites of the former islets, with scattered Cocos and Cordia In 1990, a small marae was discovered at the islet's southern end. | Narrow channel between Long and Nake Islets. |
| South Nake Islets | Pandanus Islet | 74,000 m^{2} | Pandanus, the largest and northernmost of the South Nake Islets, was named for a Pandanus grove present along its lagoon shore. Wooded over about two-thirds of its area, the islet appears to have increased in size significantly over Arundel's 19th-century charts, and is growing by accumulation of sand on the eastern edge. The western (seaward) shore also shows an unusually high amount of coral rubble. | |
| South Nake Islets | Danger Islet | 27,000 m^{2} | Danger Islet, named on account of the shark-infested channel which separates it from Pandans to the north, is oval-shaped and possesses the typical concentric distribution of flora: wide herb mats, Tournefortia scrub, and a central Pisonia and Cordia forest. | |
| South Nake Islets | Booby Islet | 8,000 m^{2} | Named for the two booby species present, this teardrop-shaped islet is small, but is wooded over two-thirds of its area. The virgin Pisonia forest in the center forms a circle 40 m in diameter. | |
| South Nake Islets | Coral Islet | 17,000 m^{2} | Coral Islet (named for the coral reef which forms the geological substrate of the atoll) is a shallow arrowhead-shaped islet which is in the process of uniting with the two islets directly south; the channels between them are only centimeters deep at low tide. The central Pisonia forest on Coral is rather small, possibly on account of coarse soil. | |
| South Nake Islets | Lone Palm Islet | 20,000 m^{2} | A distinctive long coconut palm rising out of a grove of Tournefortia, observed during the 1988 survey, gave this islet its name. The plant distribution on Lone Palm is otherwise typical: herb mats, Tournefortia scrub, and a line of Pisonia trees. | |
| South Nake Islets | Motu Kota ("Red‑footed Booby Islet") | 6,000 m^{2} | Nearly joined to Motu Mouakena to its south, this small islet exhibits an unusually high density of red-footed boobies, which give it its name. Predominantly covered by Tournefortia, Kota also had a single Cocos tree and few Pisonia in 1988. | |
| South Nake Islets | Motu Mouakena ("Masked Booby Islet") | 10,000 m^{2} | Named for the uncommon masked booby, which has been observed nesting on this U-shaped islet, formed from the convergence of two separate islets in the not-too-distant past. Unusually infertile, over a third of Mouakena's surface area is barren. An emerging shoal lies just to the south of Mouakena, already stable enough to support Tournefortia. | Frigatebirds in Mouakena's Pisonia forest. |
| Central Leeward Islets | Motu Mannikiba ("Seabird Islet") | 215,000 m^{2} | The fourth-largest islet on Caroline Atoll, Mannikibi measures 700 m north–south and 375 m east–west. Its vegetation exhibits the standard zones seen on the islets of Caroline: herb mats, Tournefortia scrub, and Pisonia forest. The Pisonia occupies less than half of the islet, probably as a result of being cut for the growth of Cocos in the 1920s. A few scattered Cocos still remain. Because of the numerous seabirds that gave the islet its name, Mannikiba was also likely heavily disturbed during the earlier guano-mining era. | Mannikiba's shoreline with Pisonia and Cocos. |
| Central Leeward Islets | Blackfin Islet | 26,000 m^{2} | Blackfin, shaped in the form of two conjoined ovals, recently assimilated a small islet on its northwest corner; consequently its coasts are irregular, and coral rubble covers 30% of the islet, with herb mats over much of the rest. The central forest of Cordia and Pisonia rises to a height of 9 m. The island was given the name "Blackfin" after two shark attacks on the 1988 survey expedition in its north channel. | |
| Central Leeward Islets | Motu Matawa ("White Tern Islet") | 17,000 m^{2} | This island, named for its white terns, measures 105 m by 190 m. Aside from its narrow beaches, Matawa is largely covered with Tournefortia, which rises to a Pisonia-Cordia forest on the eastern side. | |
| Central Leeward Islets | Emerald Isle | 83,000 m^{2} | Emerald, a crescent-shaped islet named for the color of the nearby lagoon waters, exhibits a high diversity of plant life: in addition to the Heliotropium herb mats, Tournefortia grows mixed with Pandanus along the seaward side. The interior forest is mixed, with Pandanus, Tournefortia, Pisonia, and Cordia mixed along the eastern shore, with two small Cocos groves. The fragmented character of the forest suggest that the islet was significantly disturbed by human activity in the past. | |
| Central Leeward Islets | Shark Islet | 80,000 m^{2} | Named for another shark encounter during the 1988 survey, this time along the beach, Shark Islet possesses Caroline's most notable sandy beach on its lagoon shore. Vegetation exists in concentric rings, rising to a Pisonia forest that covers about half the islet and provides abundant nesting venues for great frigatebirds and black noddies. | Shark Islet seen across the Caroline Island lagoon. |
| Central Leeward Islets | Scarlet Crab Islet | 5,000 m^{2} | Named for the scarlet hermit crab abundant on its shores, Scarlet Crab is a young and small islet, measuring 40 m north–south and 125 m east–west, and lying just off the southern coast of Shark Islet. Its reef flats are the most extensive of those on the leeward side of the atoll, extending out some 480 m. Vegetation is slight and covers only a fraction of the islet. | |
| Central Leeward Islets | Motu Nautonga ("Sea Cucumber Islet") | 3,000 m^{2} | Named for the black sea cucumbers visible within the lagoon from its shore, Nautonga measures 70 m by 80 m and is shallow, barely rising above the reef flats. Despite its small size, it still contains a central forest of Tournefortia and Pisonia. | |
| Central Leeward Islets | Azure Islet | 2,000 m^{2} | This small (30 m by 66 m) and sparsely vegetated islet exhibits a typical profile of a young motu: plant life observed during the 1988 survey consisted of a small mound of Tournefortia and a single Pisonia tree. It is the smallest of Caroline's islets to house Pisonia. Despite having barely a dozen shrubs, four different species of seabird were observed to nest on Azure. | |
| Central Leeward Islets | Reef-Flat Islet | 1,000 m^{2} | This strip of coral rubble rises above the reef flats to a size of only 20 m by 60 m; with only three plant species observed; no birds have been sighted on the islet. | |
| Central Leeward Islets | Bird Islet | 41,000 m^{2} | Oval-shaped Bird Islet lies along the inner edge of the lagoon reef. It shows little sign of past disturbance and is heavily wooded, with Tournefortia and Pisonia forest sharing the majority of the land area. The mature forest including Morida, Boerhavia and Achyranthes in its understory. The island likely takes its name from black noddies and sooty terns which nest in its foliage. | |
| Central Leeward Islets | Fishball Islet | 6,000 m^{2} | Named for a broken fishing float discovered by the 1988 expedition, Fishball is a young motu, half-covered with Heliotropium and similar herb mat cover, with scattered Tournefortia shrubs. The southernmost of the Central Leeward Islets, a wide but shallow channel separates it from the Southern Leeward Islets. | Thousands of sooty terns over Fishball at sunset. |
| Southern Leeward Islets | Motu Raurau ("Blue-Gray Noddy Islet") | 35,000 m^{2} | Oval in shape, Raurau possess the largest field of coral rubble around its periphery. The central Pisonia forest is also rich with Morinda in its understory, including the tallest Morinda seen on the 1988 survey. The islet is also rich in frigatebirds. | |
| Southern Leeward Islets | Motu Eitei ("Frigatebird Islet") | 14,000 m^{2} | Named for the great frigatebirds which nest on the islet, Eitei possesses the typical distribution of flora; however, the southern herb mat on Eitei was noted to contain an abundance of Portulaca. Portulaca also, unusually, occurs in openings within the wooded center of the island. | |
| Southern Leeward Islets | Pisonia Islet | 24,000 m^{2} | This islet was named for its robust central Pisonia forest, which is surrounded by Tournefortia scrub growing up to 9 m, and an herb mat of Heliotropium almost exclusively. The 1988 survey found the red-footed booby and the Polynesian rat abundant. | |
| Southern Leeward Islets | Motu Kimoa ("Rat Islet") | 18,000 m^{2} | Teardrop-shaped Kimoa appears to have increased in size since Arundel's 19th-century survey, as attested by the wide rubble fields and herb mats on its southeastern edge. A rich Tridacna reef extends across the lagoon to Tridacna Islet on the opposite side. The interior forest of Kimoa covers almost half the islet's area. | |
| Southern Leeward Islets | Motu Ana-Ana ("Anne's Islet") | 21,000 m^{2} | Named by Ron Falconer for his wife Anne, Ana-Ana was the site of the Falconer family's four-year residence in the late 1980s, where they built three thatched huts. Typical of the Southern Leewards except for the settlement, a Pisonia forest covers over 40% of the islet. The Falconers introduced several foreign plant species during their stay, including vegetables and several ornamentals, as well as chickens, ducks, and a dog. The human settlement was reported during the 1988 survey to have disrupted seabird breeding on Ana-Ana. | The Falconers; Ron named Ana-Ana after his wife Anne. |
| Windward Islets | Bosun Bird Islet | 9,000 m^{2} | Bosun Bird, named during the 1988 expedition for its population of red-tailed tropicbirds, the largest on Caroline Atoll, lies just south of Long Islet. Small and composed mainly of coral rubble and sand, it supports only herb mats and Tournefortia. | A juvenile of the tropicbirds for which this islet is named. |
| Windward Islets | Windward Islet | 114,000 m^{2} | Named for its position as the largest of the Windward Islets, this islet was totally cleared in 1920 and planted with Cocos; however, during the 1988 survey, the islet had largely recovered from this disturbance, and the islet exhibited a typical profile of herb mat, Tournefortia, and Pisonia-Cordia forest, with no Cocos present. | Tournefortia and a rare stand of Scaevola on the rim of Windward. |
| Windward Islets | Crescent Islet | 31,000 m^{2} | A small atoll composed mainly of coral rubble, Crescent is wooded with Pisonia-Cordia forest over about two-thirds of its area. | |
| Windward Islets | Motu Atibu ("Coral Rubble Islet") | 0.02 ha | The smallest of the permanent islets of Caroline Atoll (13 m by 18 m) surveyed in 1988, Atibu is reported to have disappeared entirely following a February 1990 storm. | |
| Windward Islets | North Pig Islet | 54,000 m^{2} | Nearly symmetrical in shape and vegetation, North Pig, like other islets on Caroline, was planted with Cocos in 1920; however, as of 1988, none remained and the islet has regrown a robust Pisonia-Cordia forest. It is also home to the largest black noddy colony on Caroline Atoll. | |
| Windward Islets | Pig Islet | 72,000 m^{2} | Named for a population of domestic pigs introduced in 1828 and re-introduced in 1848, there is today no evidence of any adverse effect from the introduction of that non-indigenous species (no longer present). Like other islets, a large Cocos population was planted in 1920, but now occurs infrequently on the island. Pig's Pisonia forest covers 46% of the islet—the largest proportion of any islet in the atoll. | Noddies and terns next in Pig's extensive Pisonia forest. |
| Windward Islets | Skull Islet | 200 m^{2} | Named for the discovery of a red-tailed tropicbird during the 1988 survey. Although small and apparently young, the islet was recorded by Arundel in the 19th century. Mostly barren except for a few Tournefortia bushes and an herb mat on the lagoon side, birds were first noted on the islet in 1990. | |
| Windward Islets | North Brothers Islet | 17,000 m^{2} | An oval-shaped rubble islet that may have once been connected to Brothers Islet directly south, North Brothers contains an expansive community of Tornefortia on the western side which rises to a Pisonia forest on the east end, with a few remnant Cocos present from the 1920 planting. | |
| Windward Islets | Brothers Islet | 43,000 m^{2} | Named after Captain Brothers, who established a stock-raising community on Caroline Atoll, this islet has recent absorbed a small motu (recorded by Ardundel) on its southwest point. A few Cocos from the 1920 planting remain, but the island now exhibits typical vegetation—peripheral herb mats, Tournefortia scrub, and a central Pisonia forest which is strikingly monotopic. | Terns fly over Brothers' Pisonia-Cordia forests. |
| Windward Islets | Noddy Rock | 200 m^{2} | This small rock is named for the only seabird observed to breed on it — the brown noddy, which incubates on the Portulaca mat covering its central portion. The entire limestone plateau measures 26 m by 9 m. | |
| Windward Islets | North Arundel Islet | 9,000 m^{2} | North Arundel, located just north of Arundel Islet, is extremely similar in composition to its southern neighbor, from which it is separated by a narrow channel. Morinda is unusually common on North Arundel. | A Cordia forest on North Arundel Islet. |
| Windward Islets | Arundel Islet | 73,000 m^{2} | Named for John T. Arundel, the manager of the guano and copra operations on Caroline in the late 1890s, Arundel, like its neighbor directly north, has poor soil and, consequently, a relatively small Pisonia forest. Tournefortia dominates the atoll, and Achyranthes is unusually abundant. | Arundel Islet seen across lagoon shallows. |
| Windward Islets | Tridacna Islet | 91,000 m^{2} | The southernmost of the Windward Islets, Tridacna was named for the nearby coral reef and its dense population of giant clams (Tridacna maxima). Tornefortia-Morinda scrub cover 88% of the islets, which is particularly scarce in Pisonia. Patches of Lepturus reflect earlier clearing of the islet, which is also a major breeding ground for the sooty tern. | The lagoon reef of Tridacna Islet with an extensive clam population. |
| South Islet | | 1,044,000 m^{2} | South Islet, also known as Rimapoto, is the southernmost and largest islet on Caroline Island, and the most common landing site. The island was visited by Tuamotuans, and then by Europeans; those visits brought non-native plants and animals to South Islet, but only coconut palms persisted. The first stock-raising community was placed on South in 1846, and it was the observation site for the 1883 eclipse expedition. A house was built for the manager of the settlement, which lasted at least until a visit by HMS Wellington in 1936. No evidence of these structures remained at the 1988 survey expedition visit. South Island forms the southern boundary of the central lagoon, and this beach, lined with coconut palms, is described by Kepler as "one of the most picturesque spots on the atoll." Overgrown Cocos cover over three quarters of South Island, together with abundant herbs and Ipomoea vine. The southeastern corner of the islet is covered with an herb mat; the island is otherwise devoid of the typical Tournefortia scrub or Pisonia forests — the Pisonia were recorded as "80 to 100 feet (30 m) high" by Arundel in the 1870s before clearing began. Despite the island's large area, the 1988 survey team observed only two species of birds: the brown noddy and the white tern. The Cocos-Ipomea forest also houses Caroline's greatest population of coconut crabs, estimated in 1988 at over 500 individuals. | Introduced coconut palms on the beach of South Islet. |

== See also ==
- Desert island
- List of islands
