= Raine Island Beacon =

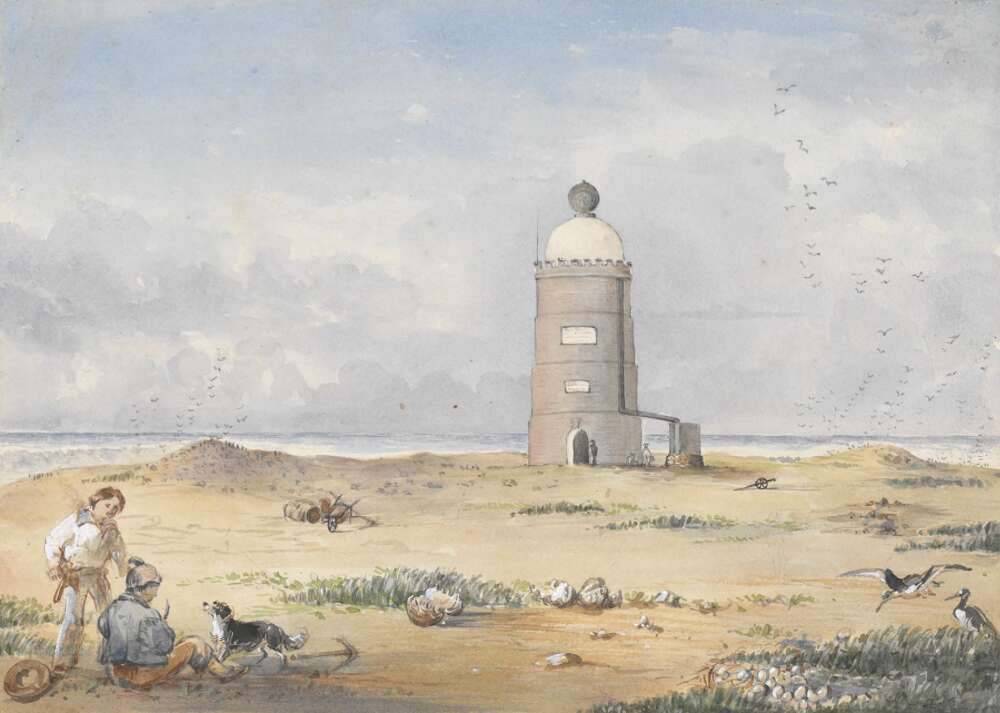
- Beacon built at Raines Islet by Edwin Augustus Porcher, 1844

- Location within Queensland Location within Australia
- 11.5905°S 144.0351°E
- Location: Eastern end of Raine Island, Shire of Cook, Queensland, Australia

History
- Design period: 1840s - 1860s (mid-19th century)
- Built: 1844

Queensland Heritage Register
- Official name: Raine Island Beacon
- Type: state heritage (archaeological, landscape, built)
- Designated: 21 October 1992
- Reference no.: 600432
- Significant period: 1844-1870s (historical)
- Significant components: views to, lighthouse/light station, views from
- Builders: convicts

Raine Island Beacon is a heritage-listed beacon at the eastern end of Raine Island, Shire of Cook, Queensland, Australia. It was built in 1844 by convicts. It was added to the Queensland Heritage Register on 21 October 1992.

== History ==
Ships bound north from Australia to Asia generally took the Outer Passage before turning west through the Great Barrier Reef to Torres Strait. As the area was notorious for shipwrecks, the beacon was built in 1844 to assist navigation. The beacon was built mostly of local materials: coral limestone quarried on site; shells burned to make lime for mortar; and timber from the Martha Ridgway which was wrecked nearby in 1842. Though serving as a landmark for shipping and used by crews, the beacon soon became obsolete after the northern passage was discovered. In 1890 the JT Arundel Company began mining guano on Raine Island, with a workforce of 100 Chinese. Their extensive quarries are evident over much of the island, though there is little sign of the former jetty, buildings, tramway and locomotive. The most obvious gravesite, which is marked by a tombstone, is that of Annie Eliza Ellis who died in 1891. No commercial activity is known to have occurred since 1892, though the beacon tower has been used unofficially for conveying messages, as seen in hundreds of inscriptions on the inner walls. Raine Island, with its beacon, quarries and tombstone, remains a principal wildlife habitat, while dominated by the convict-built beacon.

In 1994, the Raine Island Corporation carried out extensive repairs as well as undertaking on-going maintenance on the structure due to deterioration.

== Description ==
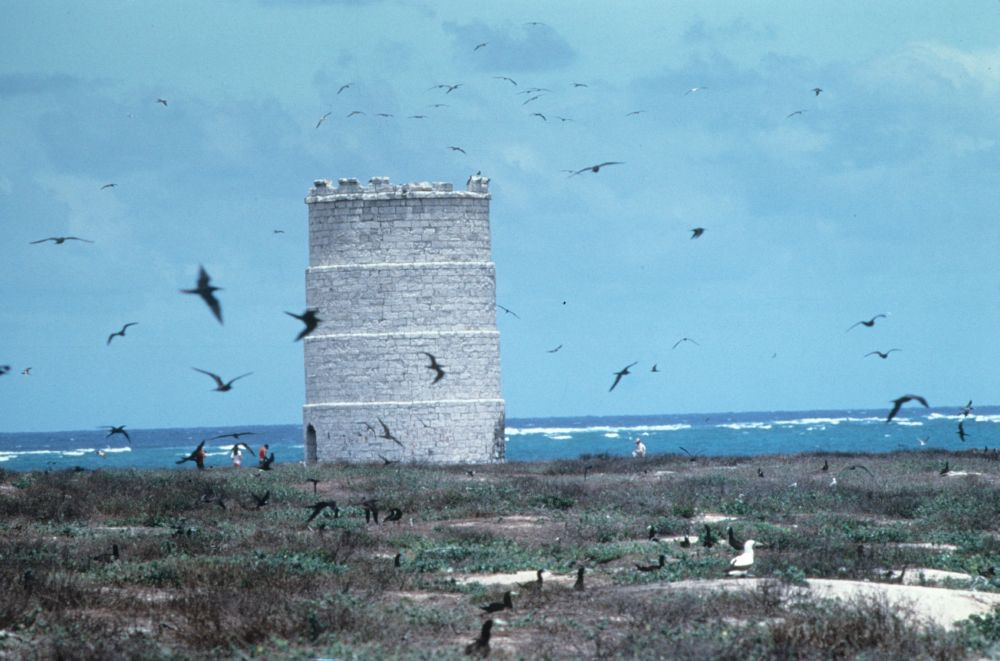
Raine Island Beacon, 1983

Raine Island Beacon is a substantial structure about 12 metres (39 ft) high with a base diameter of 9 metres (30 ft), and is visible for 13 nautical miles. Constructed of good quality coral limestone trimmed to produce a continuous curve inside and out, its cylindrical form decreases in diameter in four steps upwards and is topped by a crenellated parapet. A lightning conductor of wrought copper is fitted from top to bottom of the east face. The only opening in the walls is a semi-circular arched doorway surmounted by the standard inscription VR and date: 1844. Two inscribed stone plaques inserted into the wall above the keystone are illegible due to erosion. The interior originally comprised three levels of wooden floors which were reached by ladders and topped by a dome of timber ribs covered with canvas.

== Heritage listing ==
Raine Island Beacon was listed on the Queensland Heritage Register on 21 October 1992 having satisfied the following criteria.

The place is important in demonstrating the evolution or pattern of Queensland's history.

Constructed as early as 1844, the Raine Island Beacon served briefly as an aid to navigation and a shelter for shipwrecked sailors, and is one of the oldest and most significant structures remaining in Queensland. Its associations with northern navigation and maritime transport, as well as the penal system and island industry are reflected in the fabric of the structure and site.

The place demonstrates rare, uncommon or endangered aspects of Queensland's cultural heritage.

As an early navigation aid built of masonry on an isolated coral cay, the beacon is unique in form and context.

The place is important in demonstrating the principal characteristics of a particular class of cultural places.

As an early navigation aid built of masonry on an isolated coral cay, the beacon is unique in form and context.

The place is important because of its aesthetic significance.

It remains a landmark structure, and has an aesthetic appeal generated by its rustic materials, early workmanship, derelict nature, and dramatic, isolated ocean setting.
