= Walter Stringer =

New Zealand judge

Sir Walter Stringer KC
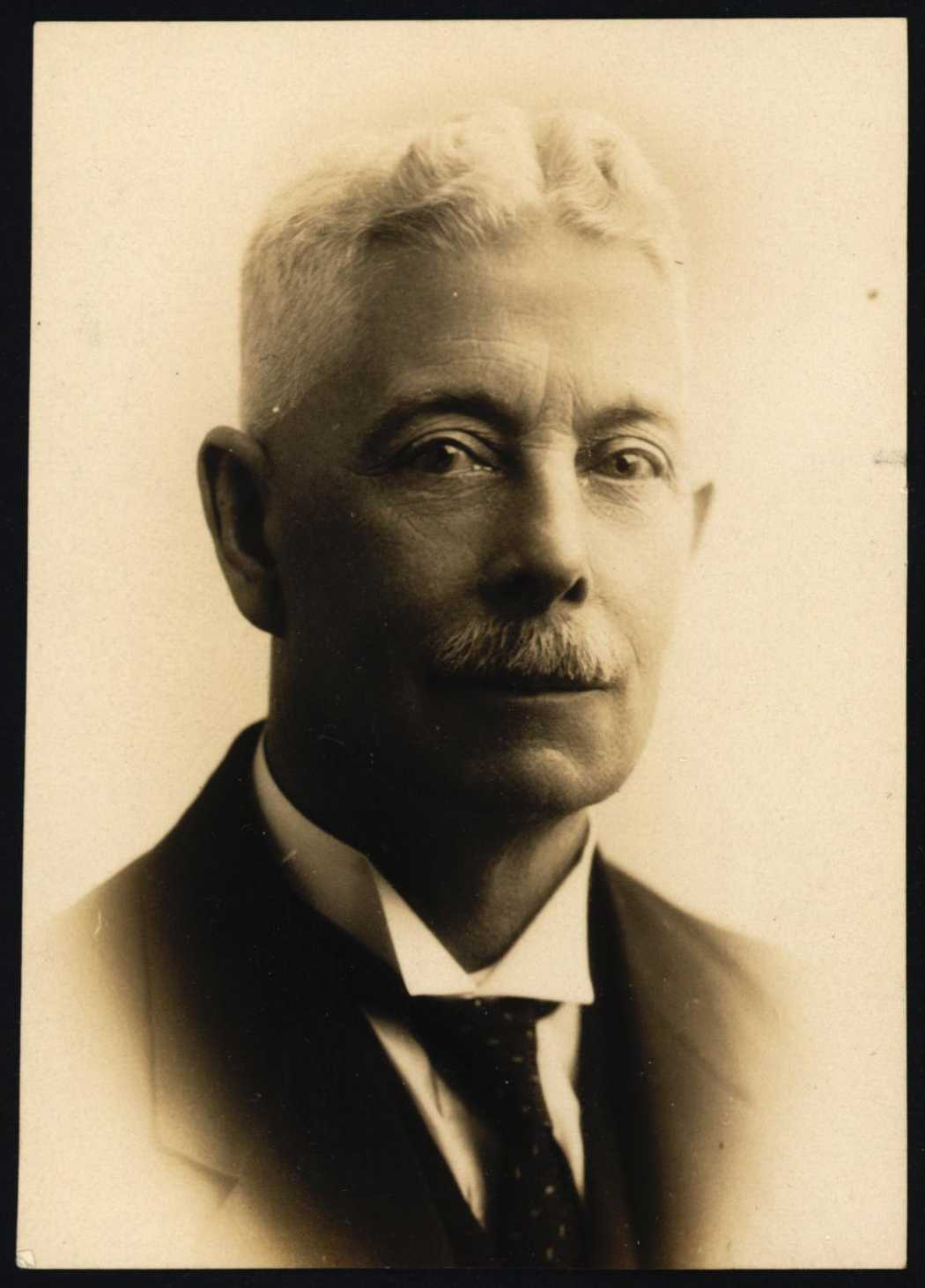
- Stringer in 1924
- Born: Thomas Walter Stringer; 4 November 1855; Christchurch, New Zealand
- Died: 8 December 1944 (aged 89); Christchurch, New Zealand
- Education: Canterbury University College
- Occupations: Lawyer, judge
- Spouse: Ada Davies (m. 1882; died 1932)

Sir Thomas Walter Stringer KC (4 November 1855 – 8 December 1944) was a New Zealand judge appointed to the King's Counsel.

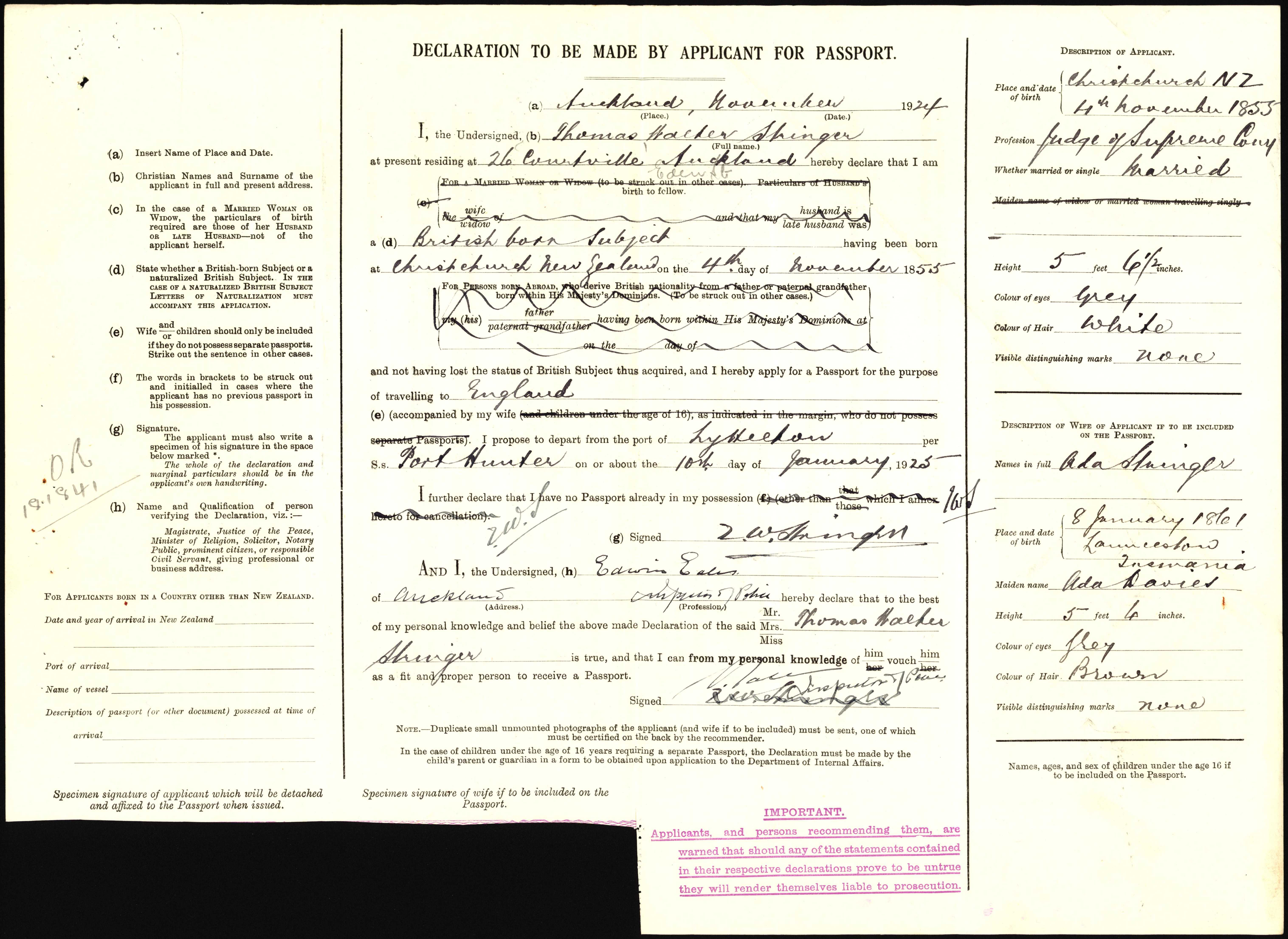
Thomas Walter Stringer & Ada Stringer passport application (1924)

== Early life and career ==
Stringer was born and raised in Christchurch. He was educated at Canterbury University College and was admitted as a barrister and solicitor in 1879. In 1882 he married Ada Davies. He became a Crown Solicitor is 1893, based in Christchurch. When the first ten appointments to the King' Counsel were made in June 1907 by Chief Justice Robert Stout, Stringer was one of two appointees from Christchurch. He was appointed to the Supreme Court in 1914.

== Later life and death ==
From 1927 to 1940 he was in charge of the War Pensions Appeal Board. He was appointed a Knight Bachelor in the 1928 New Year Honours. His wife, Ada Stringer, died in 1932. He died in Christchurch in 1944.
