= Raine Island =

Small coral cay of Queensland, Australia

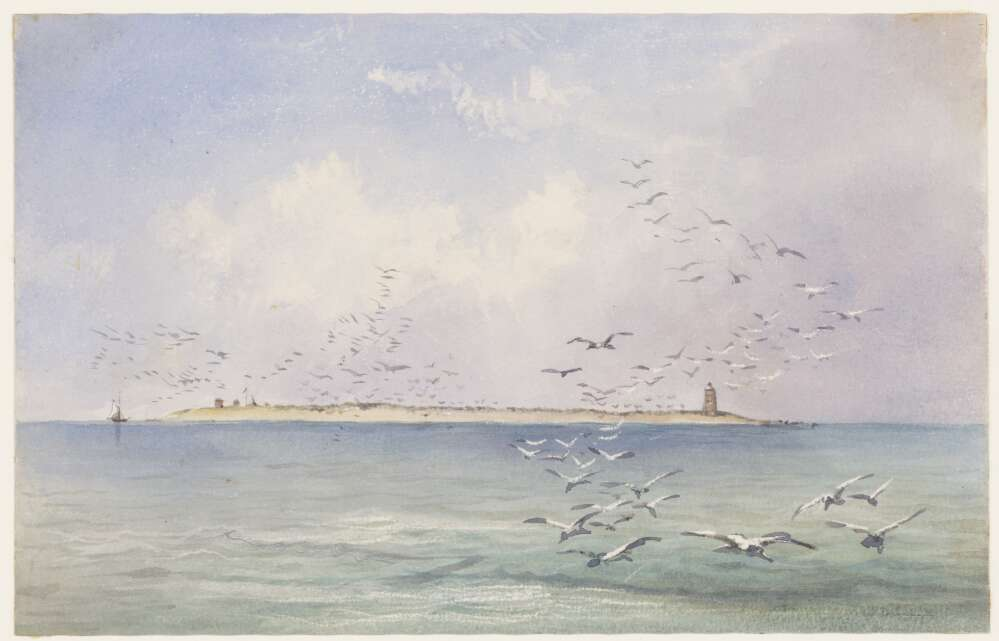
- Raines Islet on the Great Barrier Reef by Edwin Augustus Porcher, painted 1844
- Interactive map of Raine Island

Geography
- Coordinates: 11.591°S 144.037°E
- Area: 32 ha (79 acres)

Administration
- Australia
- State: Queensland
- Protected Area: Great Barrier Reef Marine Park

Raine Island is an island in the Shire of Cook in Queensland, Australia. It is 32 hectares (79 acres) in total area situated on the outer edges of the Great Barrier Reef off northeastern Australia. It lies approximately 620 km (390 mi) north-northwest of Cairns, about 120 kilometres (75 mi) east-northeast of Cape Grenville on the Cape York Peninsula.

Raine Island is the site of the oldest European structure in tropical Australia, a stone beacon built in 1844, and harbours the world's largest remaining population of green turtles (Chelonia mydas). An important environmental icon, the island is totally protected from public access.

The island was named in 1924 by the Admiralty Hydrographer, after Captain Thomas Raine (1793–1860), the English captain of the Surrey who first reported the island. Raine later became one of the directors of the Bank of New South Wales and a prominent pastoralist in the Bathurst district.

== Geography ==
Raine Island is a vegetated coral cay dominated by low herbaceous annual vegetation (Batianoff et al. 1993). The cay is composed of a central core of phosphate rock surrounded by sand and extensive fringing reefs. It lies just off the eastern edge of the continental shelf, next to a shipping channel known as the Raine Island Entrance and Pandora entrance. The entrance allows shipping to enter the water of the Great Barrier Reef.

== Environment ==
=== Turtles ===
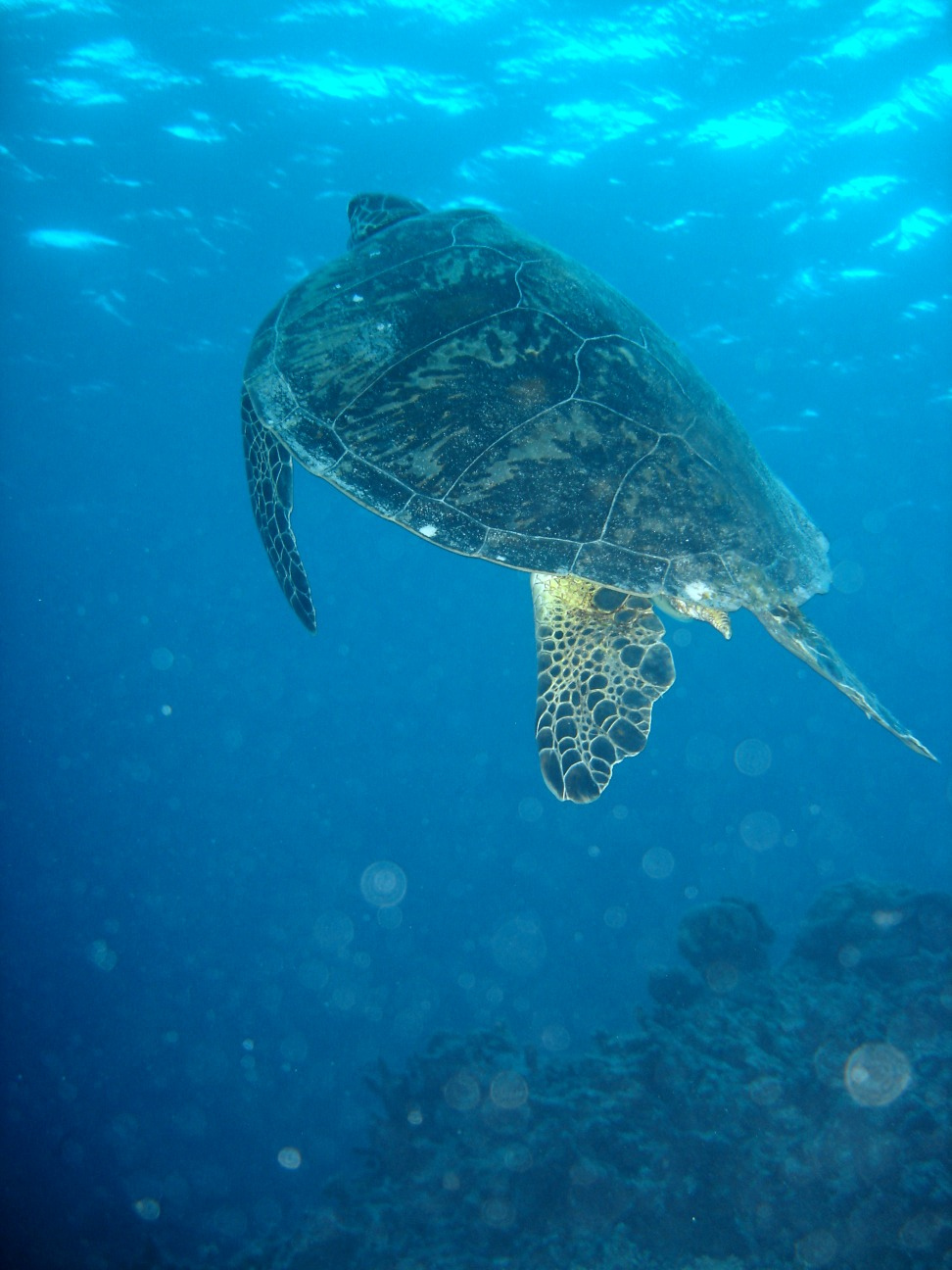
A green turtle. Raine Island harbours the largest population of these sea creatures in the world.

Raine Island is the largest and most important green sea turtle nesting area in the world, with up to 64,000 females nesting on the small coral sand cay in one season. The turtle population can vary from a figure of less than 1,000 to more than 10,000 and has been found to correlate with the El Niño-Southern Oscillation. The waters surrounding Raine Island are so active that seeing over 250 turtles during an hour in the water is common. The nesting site has been active on the island for more than 1,000 years, making it the longest known marine turtle rookery anywhere in the world.

Up to 100,000 nesting females have been observed in a season, with the cay producing 90% of the region's green turtles. However, the hatching rate declined in the 1990s, and a further decline in the population was threatened by the deaths of thousands of females as they struggled to climb the small sandy cliffs. In addition, as the shape of the island had changed over time, the spread of the beaches outwards had led to greater risk of inundation of the turtle nests. Between 2011 and 2020, a collaborative project by the Queensland Government, BHP (as corporate sponsor), the Great Barrier Reef Marine Park Authority, Great Barrier Reef Foundation, and Wuthathi and Meriam traditional owners, reshaped the island using heavy machinery in a way that gave the female turtles a smoother passage and reduced the risk of nest inundation. A sophisticated monitoring and research system, using 3D modelling, satellite technology and drones was employed, and monitoring continues.

As of June 2020, a project called "The Turtle Cooling Project" is being undertaken by scientists from the World Wildlife Fund Australia, University of Queensland, Deakin University and the Queensland Government. It is looking at the effect of global warming on northern green turtle breeding, in particular the effect of producing more female turtles owing to the higher temperatures. They are working in the area around Raine Island, Heron Island and Moulter Cay.

In 2024 and 2026, thousands of eggs were collected from Raine Island and reburied further north at Sir Charles Hardy Islands.

=== Birds ===
More than 30 bird species have been observed on the island. The island holds special significance as a seabird breeding and roosting site. It is considered as the most significant tropical seabird breeding site in the Great Barrier Reef. The Raine Island National Park (Scientific), which includes not only Raine Island (21 ha) but also the neighbouring Moulter (8.6 ha, 21 acres) and MacLennan (2.4 ha, 5.9 acres) Cays, has been identified by BirdLife International as a 32 ha (79 acres) Important Bird Area because it supports, or has supported, over 1% of the world populations of nesting masked and brown boobies, common and black noddies, as well as regionally significant populations of herald petrels, red-footed boobies and red-tailed tropicbirds.

== History ==
Raine Island falls within the traditional lands and waters of the Wuthathi Aboriginal people, who share their interests in the area with Torres Strait Islander peoples the Erubam Le (Darnley Island), the Ugarem Le (Stephen Island) and Meriam Le (Murray Island).

During the 1890s the island was mined for guano.

=== The beacon and the Raine Island Corporation ===
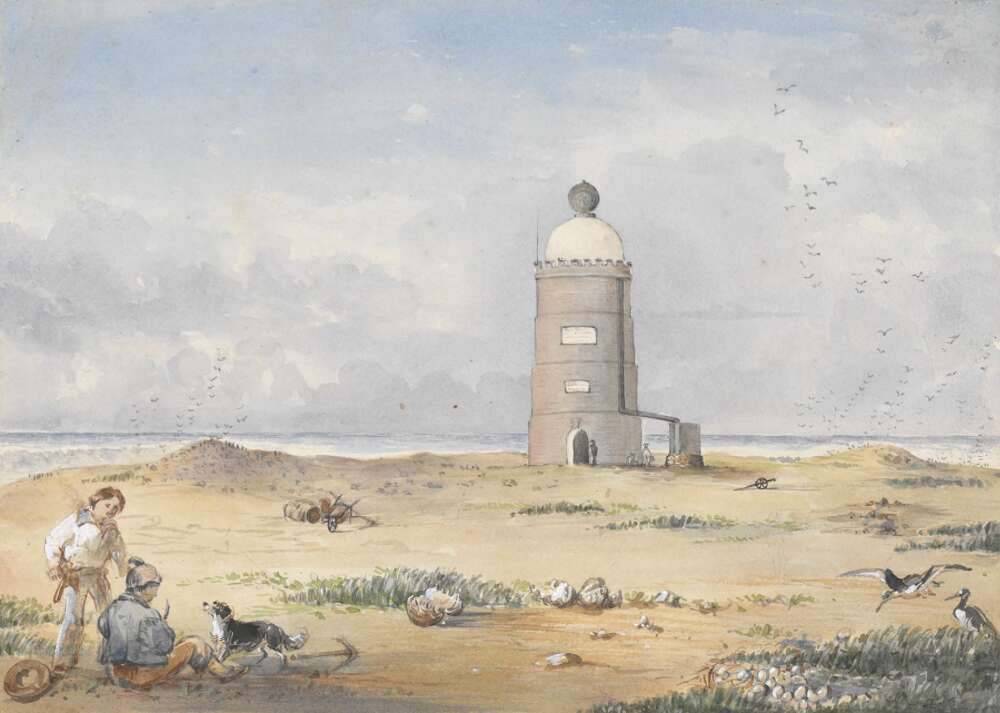
Beacon built at Raines Islet, commenced on 16 June and completed 12 September 1844

The waters around the island were treacherous for early European navigators. More than thirty shipwrecks can be found off the coast of the island including HMS Pandora, a vessel that in 1791 was involved in the capture of a group of mutineers from HMS Bounty. As a consequence, the beacon was built by convict labour in 1844, on the orders of the British Admiralty. It is the oldest European structure in the Australian tropics. The stone used in its construction was quarried from the island's phosphate rock, the timber salvaged from shipwrecks, and shells burnt to make lime for mortar. The structure took four months to complete. While the beacon never served as a lighthouse, it is visible over 13 nautical miles (24 km) from the island.

Over the years, the structure deteriorated; undermining, stone bedding loss, natural erosion, harsh weather and lightning strikes all contributed to its dilapidation. In 1988, the Raine island Corporation carried out repairs to secure the structure, for which it was honoured with the Australian Bicentennial National Trust of Queensland John Herbert Award for Excellence in Heritage Conservation. The beacon is considered one of the most important historical monuments in the Great Barrier Reef Marine Park and is listed on the Queensland Heritage Register and the Commonwealth Register of the National Estate.

The Raine Island Corporation was a self-funding statutory authority established under the auspices of the Meaker Trust (Raine Island Research) Act 1981. The Corporation's goals were to promote research into, and to ensure the preservation and protection of, the natural and cultural heritage resources of Raine Island, the Moulter and Maclennan Cays and the surrounding seas. The Act was revoked in 2005, the Corporation disbanded, and the gifted funds redirected elsewhere for other purposes.

=== National Park (Scientific) ===
In August 2007 Raine Island, along with the neighbouring Moulter and MacLennan Cays, was declared a National Park (Scientific) under Queensland's Nature Conservation Act 1992.

"Not only does Raine Island have the largest known green turtle rookery in the world with tens of thousands of turtles coming to lay their eggs each year, it is home to the endangered herald petrel and the vulnerable red-tailed tropic bird and is arguably the most significant seabird rookery on the Great Barrier Reef,"

"By upgrading Raine Island from Nature Refuge status to National Park (Scientific), its special values and adjacent cays and ensuring nature conservation research can continue to be conserved."

By declaring Raine Island to be National Park (Scientific), the seabirds and turtles breeding colonies were able to be provided the State's highest possible level of legal protection, strictly limiting all access to scientific research and essential management only.

The declaration was made possible by the Wuthathi people and interested Torres Strait Islanders entering into a special Indigenous Land Use Agreement with the State, formally registering the agreement with National Native Title Tribunal, and so allowing the declaration to proceed.

== Heritage listings ==
Raine Island has a number of heritage-listed sites, including:

- Raine Island Beacon, Eastern end of Raine Island

== See also ==
- Sir Albert Ellis, 1890s manager of phosphate mining operations on Raine Island
- John T. Arundel & Co.; Ellis' employer
- Grave of Annie Eliza Ellis; mother of Sir Albert
- List of islands of Australia
