= 1928 New Year Honours (New Zealand) =

Annual awards for New Zealanders

The 1928 New Year Honours in New Zealand were appointments by King George V on the advice of the New Zealand government to various orders and honours to reward and highlight good works by New Zealanders. The awards celebrated the passing of 1927 and the beginning of 1928, and were announced on 2 January 1928.

The recipients of honours are displayed here as they were styled before their new honour.

== Knight Bachelor ==
- The Honourable Thomas Walter Stringer KC – lately a judge of the Supreme Court.
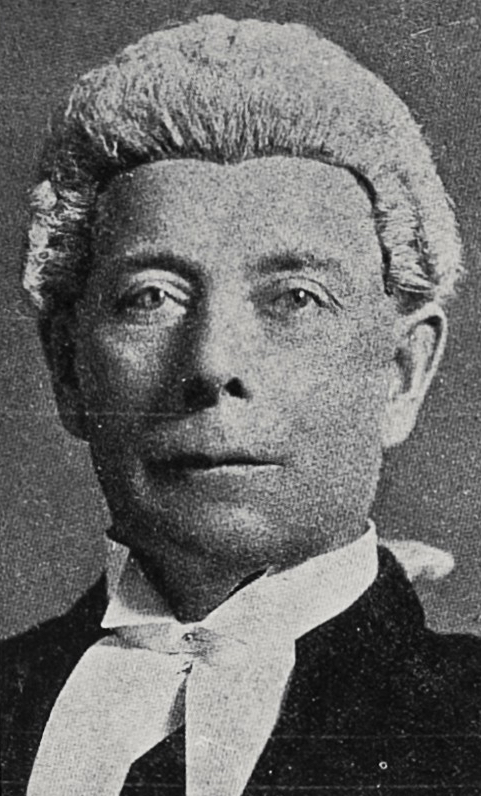
Sir Walter Stringer

== Order of Saint Michael and Saint George ==
=== Companion (CMG) ===
- George Craig – comptroller of customs.
- Albert Fuller Ellis – New Zealand member of the British Phosphate Commission.
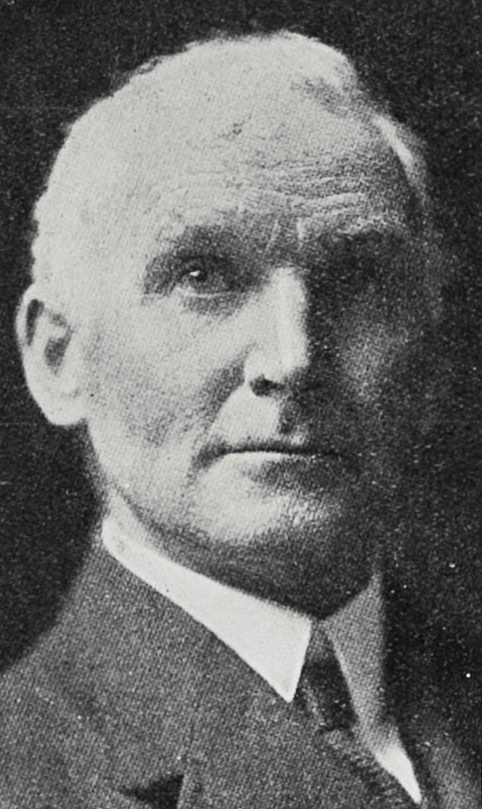
George Craig

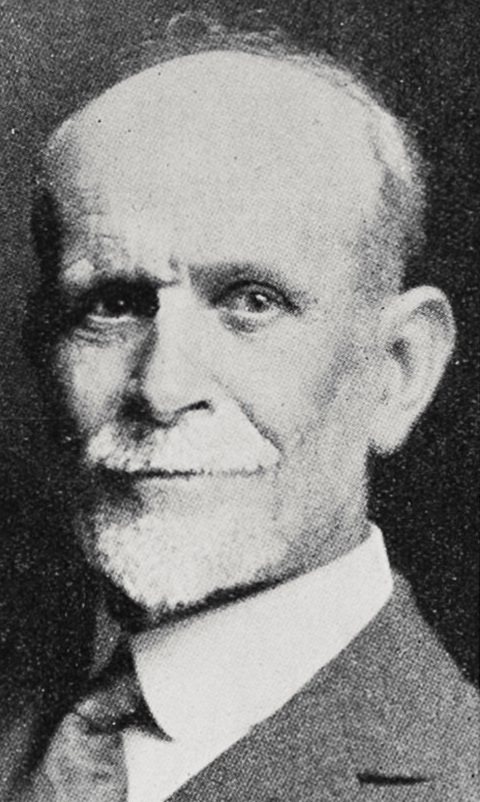
Albert Ellis
