= Caroline Island =

Coral atoll in the Pacific Ocean

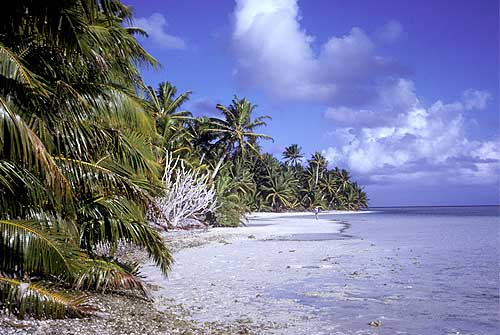
- Lagoon-facing beach on South Islet

- Location within Pacific Ocean Location within Kiribati

Geography
- Location: Pacific Ocean
- Coordinates: 09°57′18″S 150°12′45″W
- Archipelago: Line Islands
- Total islands: approximately 39 islets
- Area: 699 ha (1,730 acres)
- Highest elevation: 6 m (20 ft)

Administration
- Kiribati

Demographics
- Population: uninhabited

Caroline Island (also known as Caroline Atoll or Millennium Island) is the easternmost of several uninhabited coral atolls comprising the southern Line Islands in the central Pacific Ocean nation of Kiribati.

The atoll was first sighted by Europeans in 1606 and was claimed by the United Kingdom of Great Britain and Ireland in 1868. It has been part of the Republic of Kiribati since the island nation's independence in 1979. Caroline Island has remained relatively untouched and is one of the world's most pristine tropical islands, despite guano mining, copra (coconut meat) harvesting, and human habitation in the 19th and 20th centuries. It is home to one of the world's largest populations of the coconut crab and is an important breeding site for seabirds, most notably the sooty tern.

The atoll is known as the first place on Earth to see sunrise each day during much of the year, and for its role in the millennium celebrations of 2000. A 1995 realignment of the International Date Line made Caroline Island the first point of land on Earth to reach 1 January 2000 on the calendar.

== History ==
=== Prehistory ===
The atolls (ring-shaped coral reefs) of the Pacific Ocean are the most marginal environment in the world for human habitation. They have generally not been occupied for more than 1,500 years, but started to be settled by humans once permanent islets formed around lagoons. In comparison with other atolls, Caroline Island has been relatively undisturbed.

There are indications that early Polynesians reached the island before Europeans, as several marae (communal or sacred places) and graves have been discovered, but no evidence has been found of long-term settlement. Evidence of the largest of the marae, located on the west side of Nake Islet, was documented in 1883.

=== Early sightings and accounts ===
Ferdinand Magellan may have sighted Caroline Island on 4 February 1521. The first recorded sighting of Caroline Island by Europeans was on 21 February 1606, by the Portuguese explorer Pedro Fernández de Quirós, who named the island San Bernardo, and who wrote an account of his voyage. The island was next seen by Europeans on 16 December 1795, when the British naval officer William Robert Broughton of HMS Providence named it Carolina, after the daughter of Philip Stephens, the First Secretary of the Admiralty. The island was sighted in 1821 by the English whaler Supply, and was then named "Thornton Island" for the ship's captain. It was also recorded in the 19th century as Hirst Island and Clark Island.

Other early visits which left behind accounts of the island include that of the USS Dolphin in 1825, written by the United States Navy officer Hiram Paulding. According to this account, the crew of the Dolphin supplied themselves with fish from the island, although when wading back to their ship they were attacked by sharks.

The English whaling ship Tuscan reached Caroline island in 1835, and the geography and wildlife of the island were recorded by the ship's surgeon, the biologist Frederick Debell Bennett, in his Narrative of a Whaling Voyage Round the Globe From the Year 1833–1836. Bennett knew that the island was seldom visited, "although it is usually 'sighted' by South-Seamen, when on their way from the Society Islands to the North Pacific". He noted that about seven years before the arrival of the Tuscan, a Captain Stavers had landed on the island and left behind some pigs, of which no trace remained.

=== 1883 solar eclipse ===
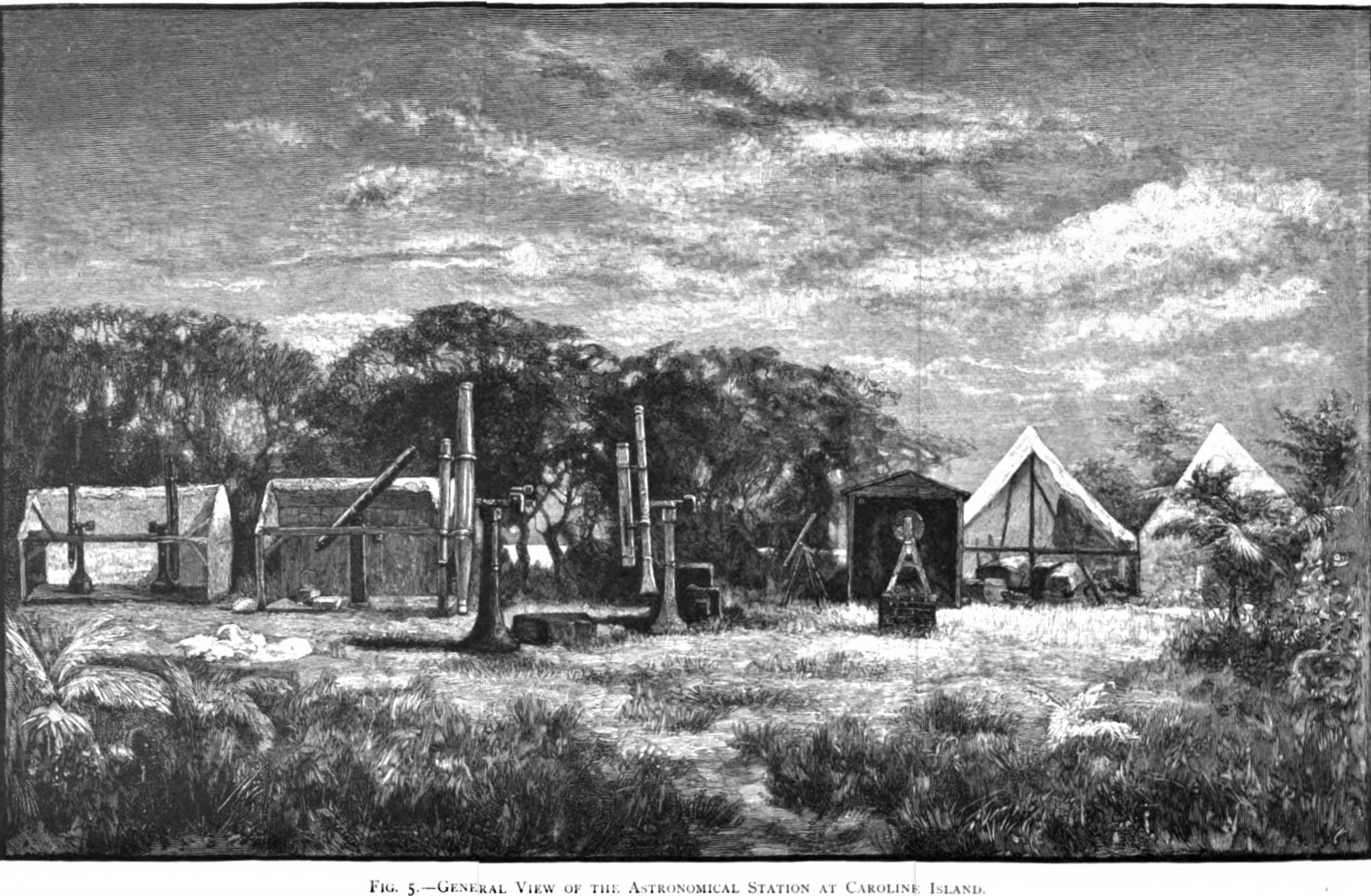
The astronomers' camp on Caroline Island, drawn by a member of the expedition

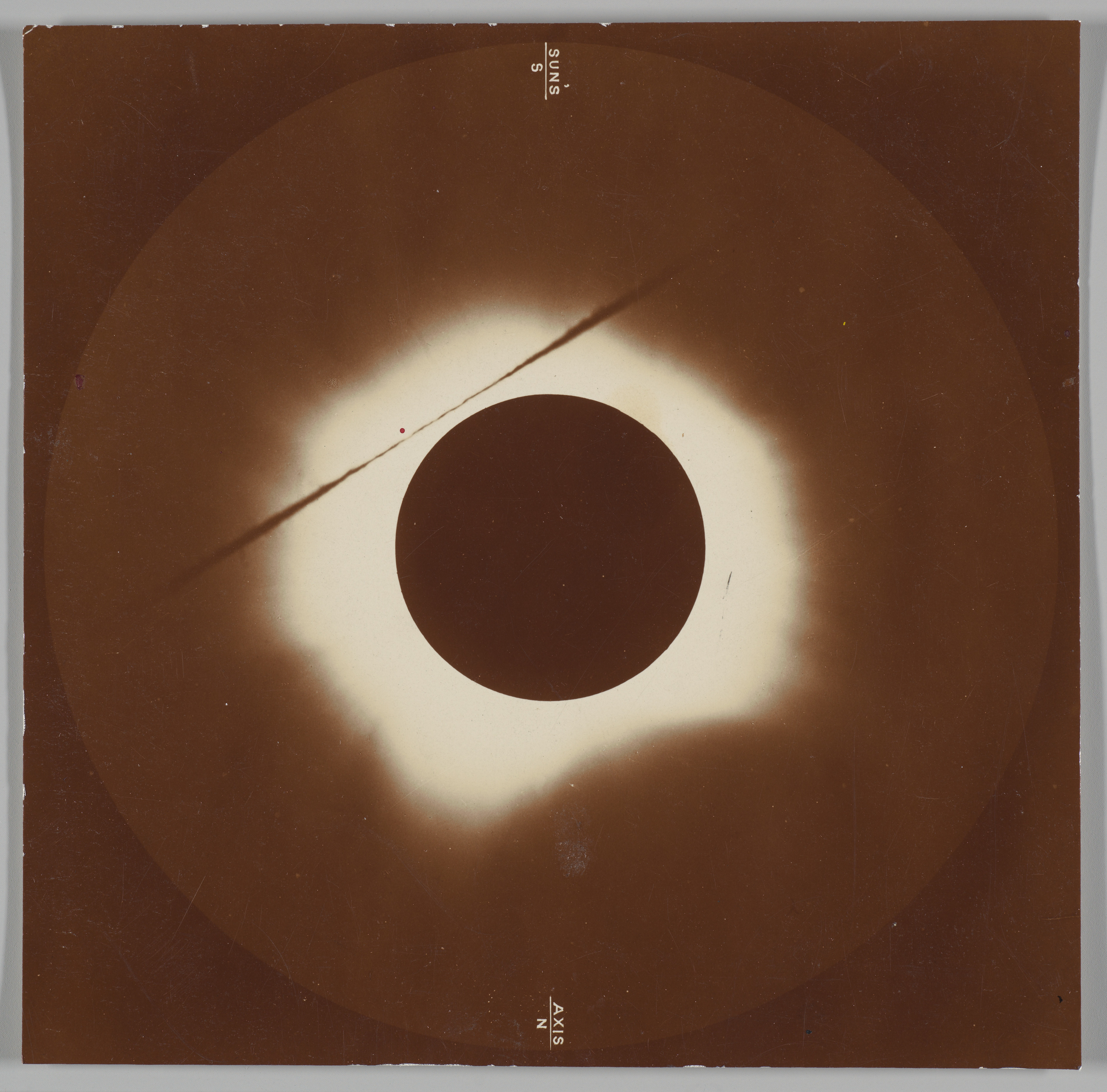
A photograph of the eclipse, taken on the island

In 1883 two expeditions arrived on Caroline Island in time to observe and record the solar eclipse of 6 May. On 22 March, American and English astronomers left the Peruvian port of Callao aboard the USS Hartford, arriving at the island on 20 April. Among those in the American expedition were the astronomers Edward S. Holden of the Washburn Observatory, the expedition's leader, and Winslow Upton, professor of astronomy at Brown University. An expedition from France arrived two days later in the L'Eclaireur.

As small boats could not come close to the shore, the equipment was carried to the island by men standing in about 2 feet (0.6 m) of water, and then about 500 yards (460 m) further to the observation site. On the morning of 6 May, the sky cleared shortly before the time of first contact, and remained clear for the rest of the day. During the eclipse, the astronomers searched for Vulcan, a hypothetical intra-Mercurial planet, but discovered nothing. The duration of totality (the time the entire disc of the Sun is obscured) was 5 minutes 25 seconds, a little less than the maximum duration of 5 minutes 58 seconds. The Austrian astronomer Johann Palisa, a member of the French expedition, discovered an asteroid later that year, which he named Carolina after the island.

=== Commercial enterprises and British claim ===
In 1846, the Tahitian firm of Collie and Lucett attempted to establish a small stock-raising and copra-harvesting community on the island; the operation met with limited financial success. In 1868, Caroline was claimed for Britain by the captain of HMS Reindeer, which noted 27 residents in a settlement on South Islet. The island was leased by the British government to Houlder Brothers and Co. in 1872, with John T. Arundel as the manager; two of the islets are named for him. Houlder Brothers and Co. conducted minimal guano mining on the island from 1874. John T. Arundel and Co. took over the lease and the industry in 1881; the company supplied a total of about 10,000 tons of phosphate until supplies became exhausted in 1895. In 1885 Arundel established a coconut plantation, but the coconut palms suffered from disease and the plantation failed. The settlement on the island lasted until 1904, when the six remaining Polynesians were relocated to Niue.

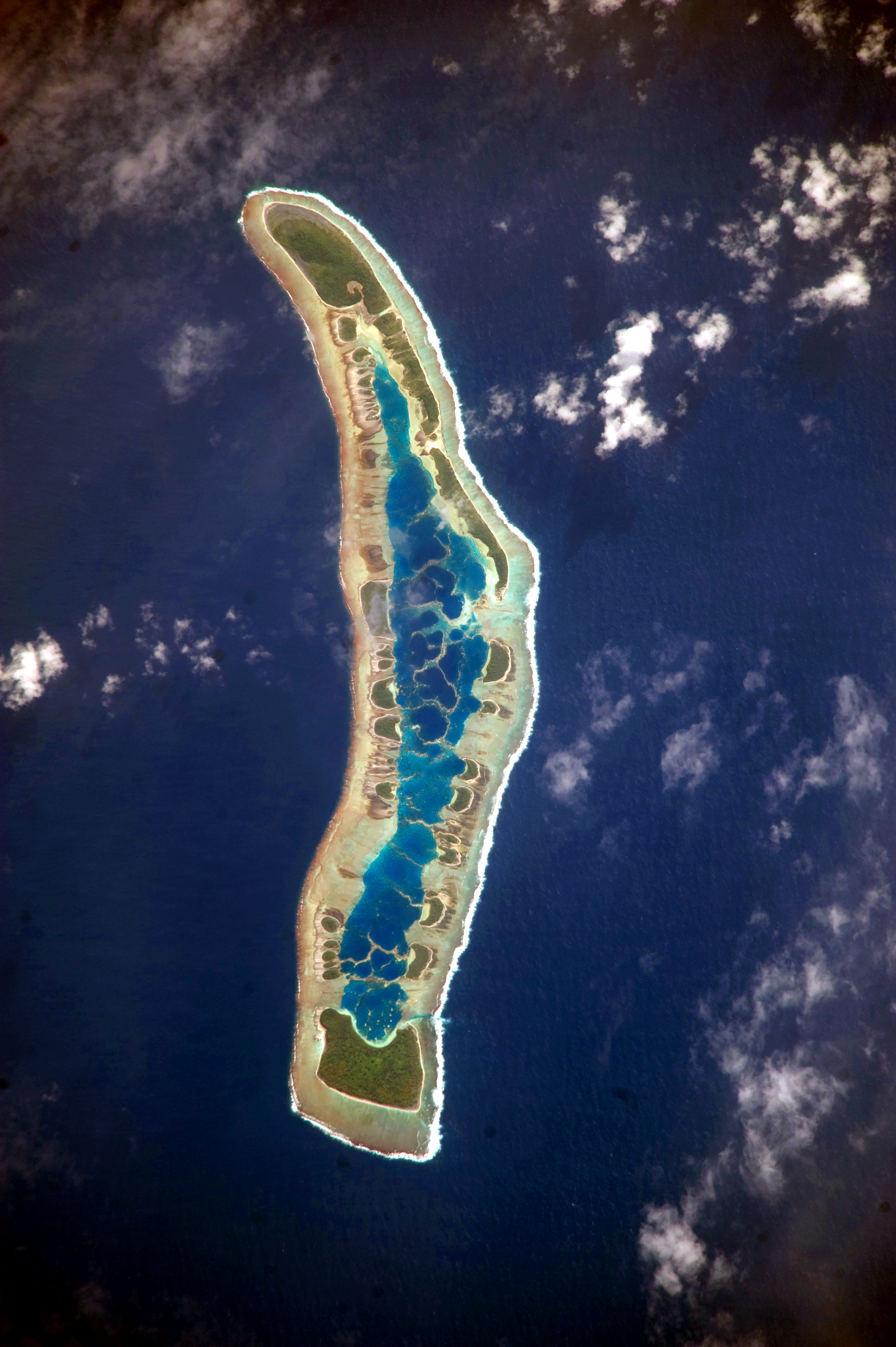
Caroline Island, visible in an astronaut photograph taken in 2009. The inner lagoon appears a lighter blue than the deeper ocean.

The island was leased to S.R. Maxwell and Company and a new settlement was established in 1916, this time built entirely upon copra export. Much of the South islet was deforested to make way for coconut palms, a non-indigenous plant. The business venture, however, went into debt, and the island's settlement slowly decreased in population. By 1926, it was down to only ten residents, and by 1936, the settlement consisted of only two Tahitian families. It was abandoned in the late 1930s.

During World War II, Caroline Island remained unoccupied, and no military action took place there. The British claim was formally reasserted and the island was placed under the jurisdiction of the Western Pacific High Commission, governed as part of the Central and Southern Line Islands. A Tahitian family was found to be living on the atoll when the American sailor John Caldwell visited it in September 1946. In January 1972, the Central and Southern Line Islands were joined with the British colony of the Gilbert and Ellice Islands, which had become autonomous in 1971.

=== Kiribati ===
When the Gilbert Islands became the independent nation of Kiribati in 1979, Caroline Island became Kiribati's easternmost point. The island is owned by the government of the Republic of Kiribati and overseen by the Ministry of Line and Phoenix Islands Development, which is headquartered on Kiritimati. Claims to sovereignty over the island by the United States were relinquished in the 1979 Treaty of Tarawa, ratified by the U.S. Senate in 1983.

The island was inhabited between 1987 and 1991 by Anne and Ron Falconer and their two young children, who developed a largely self-sufficient settlement. Following a transfer of ownership, the Falconers left the island. Ron Falconer later published an account of their stay in his book Together Alone. In the 1990s, the island was occasionally visited by Polynesian copra gatherers under agreements with the Kiribati government in Tarawa.

On 23 December 1994, the Republic of Kiribati announced a change of time zone for the Line Islands would take effect on 31 December 1994. This adjustment placed all of Kiribati on the Asian or western side of the International Date Line. Although Caroline Island's longitudinal position of 150 degrees west corresponded to a UTC offset of −10 hours, the island's new time zone became UTC+14. This move made Caroline Island both the easternmost land in the earliest time zone (by some definitions, the easternmost point on Earth), and the first point of land which would see sunrise on 1 January 2000—at 5:43 a.m. local time. Other Pacific nations, including Tonga, New Zealand and Fiji, protested the move, objecting that it infringed on their claims to be the first land to see dawn in the year 2000. According to the United States Naval Observatory, the first point of land to see sunrise on 1 January 2000 (local time) was between the Dibble Glacier and Victor Bay in East Antarctica, at 66 degrees south, where the sun rose at 12:08 a.m.

In August 1997, to promote events to mark the arrival of the year 2000, Caroline Island was renamed Millennium Island by the Kiribati government. In December 1999, over 70 Kiribati singers and dancers travelled to Caroline from South Tarawa, accompanied by approximately 25 journalists, as part of the celebrations to mark the arrival of the new millennium.

In 2017 a Russian businessman proposed a deal to invest $350 million to build a resort in Kiribati in exchange for sovereign rights over three islands. The deal was rejected by the Kiribati government based on a report from the Kiribati Foreign Investment Commission.

== Geography and climate ==
Caroline Island lies near the southeastern end of the Line Islands, a string of atolls and islands extending across the equator, 2,400–3,300 km (1,500–2,100 mi) south of the Hawaiian Islands in the central Pacific Ocean. The slightly crescent-shaped atoll has a land area of 699 hectares (2.70 mi^{2}). It consists of approximately 39 separate islets, surrounding a narrow lagoon; the smallest islet, Motu Atibu, may have disappeared. The islets—which rise to a height of 6 m (20 ft) above sea level—share a common geologic origin, and consist of sand deposits and limestone rock set atop a coral reef. According to the path of the International Date Line, the atoll is the easternmost point of land on Earth.

Map of Caroline Island

Three islets make up the bulk of Caroline's land area: Nake Islet (91.7 hectares (0.917 km^{2})) at the north, Long Islet (76.0 hectares (0.760 km^{2})) at the northeast of the lagoon, and South Islet (104.4 hectares (1.04 km^{2})) at the southern end. The other islets, most of which were named during a 1988 ecological survey conducted by the naturalists Cameron and Angela Kepler, fall into four groups: the South Nake Islets, the Central Leeward Islets, the Southern Leeward Islets, and the Windward Islets. The island is vulnerable to erosion by spring tides, storms, and strong winds; storms have caused smaller islets to sometimes appear or disappear, and the shapes of larger ones to become altered.

The lagoon, roughly 6 by 0.5 km (3.73 by 0.31 mi) in size, is shallow—it is at most 8.8–13.7 m (29–45 ft) in depth—and is crossed repeatedly by narrow coral heads and patch reefs. Reef flats generally extend over 500 m (1,600 ft) from the shore—although some sources report them to extend more than 1,000 metres (3,300 ft) from land—and make boat landings perilous except at high tide. There are no natural landings, anchorages, or deep water openings into the lagoon; water that spills into it over shallow channels at high tide is contained within the surrounding reef and remains stable despite ocean tides. Most landings are made at a small break in the reef at the northeast corner of South Islet.

There is no standing fresh water on Caroline Island, but Nake Islet and South Islet have underground freshwater aquifers and freshwater lenses. The underground water supply on Nake attracted Polynesian settlers, but the first European explorers to reach the atoll searched in vain for drinking water; wells were built to tap drinking water for later temporary settlements. Little is known about the island's existing freshwater lenses. Soils are of poor quality, dominated by coral gravel and sand, with organic content present only within stable, forested island centers. Guano deposits make island soil, where it does exist, nitrogen-rich.

Like the rest of Kiribati, Caroline Island enjoys a tropical maritime climate which is consistently hot and humid, with air temperatures that relate closely to sea temperature. Across Kiribati average temperatures vary no more than 1 °C from season to season.

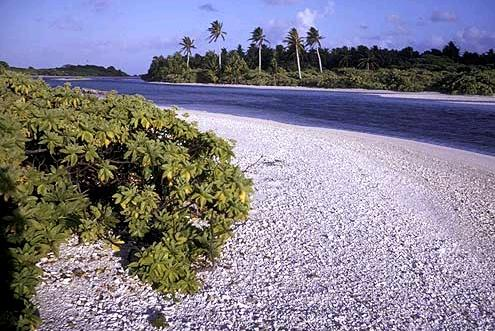
Channel between Long Islet and Nake Islet (in background)

There is no weather station located at Caroline. During 2014 (as of 2021 the last year for which data is publicly available), monthly mean temperatures at South Tarawa, the capital of Kiribati, ranged between 28.3 and 29.7 °C (82.9–85.5 °F), with maximum monthly temperatures ranging from 31.0 to 32.5 °C (87.8–90.5 °F) and minimum temperatures ranging from 25.0 to 26.5 °C (77.0–79.7 °F). Caroline Island lies within a region of highly variable precipitation; between 1950 and 2010 the region received an average of 1,700 to 2,500 mm (67 to 98 in) of rain annually. Tides are on the order of 0.5 m (1.6 ft), and trade winds, generally from the northeast, mean that corner of the island experiences the roughest seas.

Caroline Island is among the most remote islands on Earth. It is 230 km (140 mi) from the closest land at Flint Island, and 5,100 km (3,200 mi) from the nearest continental land in North America.

== Geology ==
Caroline Atoll is one of over 175 atolls and coral islands in the Pacific Ocean. The English naturalist and geologist Charles Darwin first suggested the theory, still accepted, that atolls originate from calcium carbonate platforms that grow around the cones of extinct, sinking volcanoes. Caroline Atoll's high volcanic island has subsided below sea level; the surrounding coral reef has developed upwards, built by corals, its typically annular shape caused by underwater weathering. The coral reef will continue to develop as long as it is not overtaken by rising sea levels, in which case the corals will perish and the atoll will stop growing.

The seabed around the Southern Line Islands

The Line Islands chain is made of seamounts and ridges from the Tuamotu Islands in the south to Johnston Atoll in the north; which rise from the ocean floor from a depth of 5,000 metres (3.1 mi). Caroline Island is one of 12 seamounts in the chain to rise above sea level.

The igneous rocks of all the Line Islands consist of alkali basalts and hawaiites, and are similar to those found in the Hawaiian Islands. Several models have been proposed to explain the formation of the chain's complex geology. In 1972, the American geophysicist W. Jason Morgan postulated that the chain was formed 70 myr ago in parallel with the creation of the Hawaiian Islands, each by means of a single hotspot. Other experts argued against this model, pointing to geometric and paleomagnetic evidence, and the complex timing of the volcanic episodes that created the Line Island chain. In a 1976 paper, Winterer implied that chains of volcanoes were created by a series of individual hotspots.

Over the next decade it was discovered that Late Cretaceous and Eocene volcanism had occurred close to Caroline Island, as well as thousands of kilometres to the north, which disproved the single hotspot model for the formation of the Line Islands, and instead suggested the chain was made by a more complex series of volcanic events than the Hawaiian–Emperor seamount chain. During the 1980s, scientists put forward new theories to explain the evolution of the chain, including a transform fracture zone theory (since refuted by paleomagnetic data), and a multiple hotspot model which is still being discussed as of 2020. A combination of hotspot-transform fracture zone phenomena is also possible.

== Flora and fauna ==
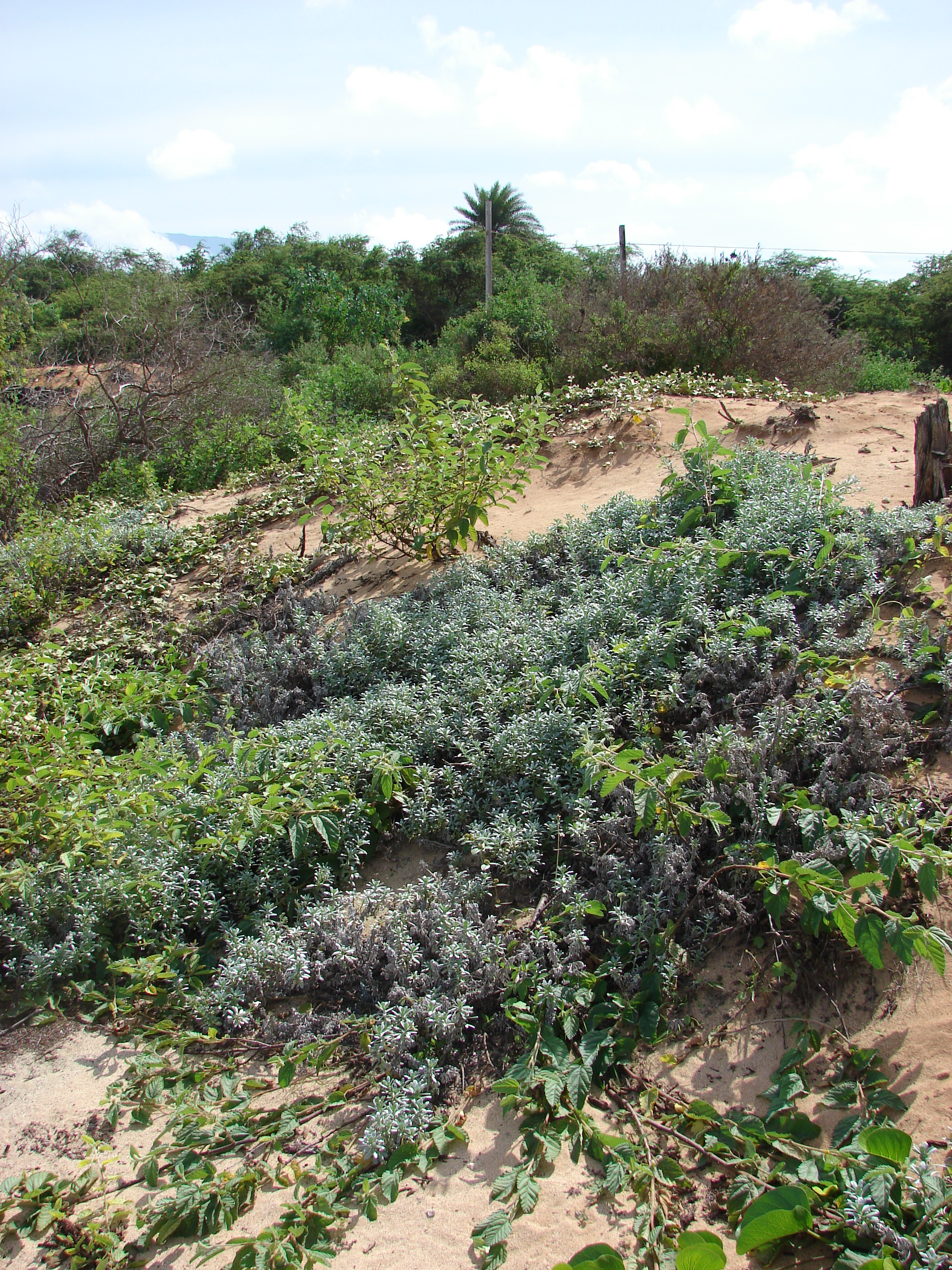
Heliotropium anomalum

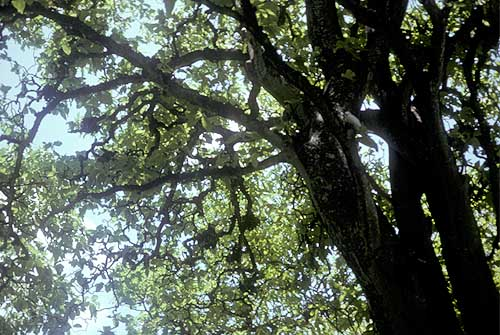
Pisonia grandis

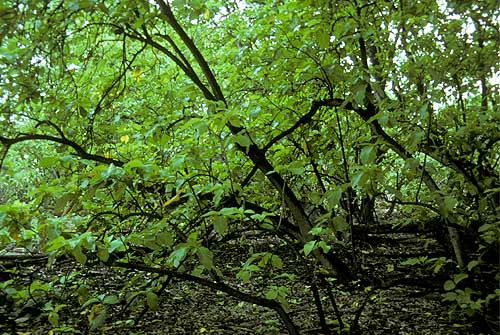
Cordia subcordata

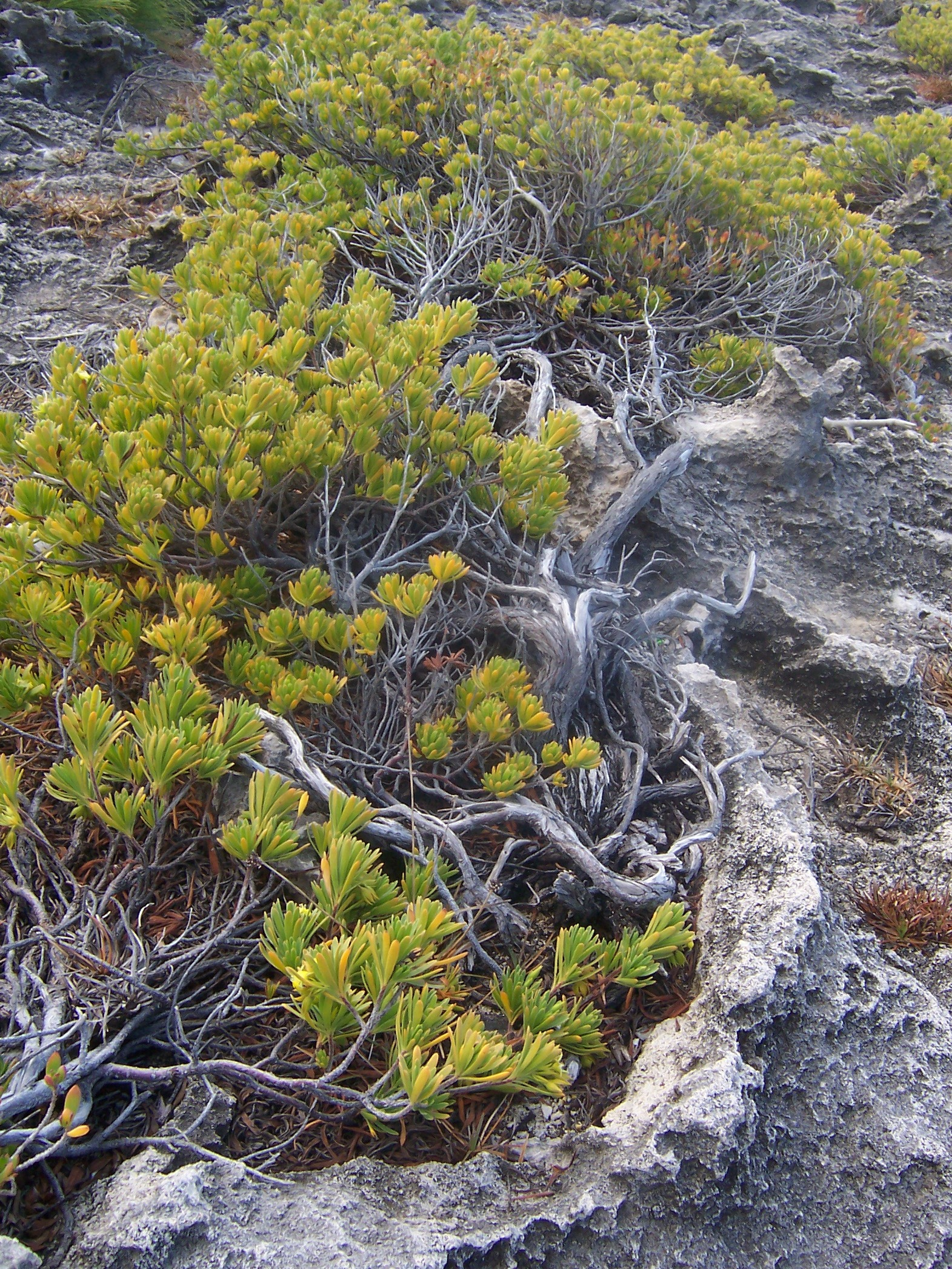
Suriana maritima

Some of the dominant plant species on Caroline Island

Despite more than three centuries of occasional human impact on Caroline Island, it is one of very few remaining near-pristine tropical islands. The United Nations rated the atoll with a 'Human Impact Index' rating of 1 in 1998, making it one of the most unspoiled islands in the world. Its undisturbed state has led to a proposal that it be designated a World Heritage Site and a Biosphere Reserve. Caroline was visited in 1965 by the Pacific Ocean Biological Survey Program, in 1974 by the Line Island Expedition, and in 1988 and 1991 by the United Nations Environment Programme (UNEP) Wildlife Conservation Unit. A 1991 Kiribati Government expedition, comprising personnel of the Wildlife Conservation Unit and officials of the Ministry of Line and Phoenix Islands Development, agreed that with the exception of South Islet, Long Islet, and Nake Islet, the Caroline Atoll islets should become Wildlife Sanctuaries.

In 1988, 90% of Caroline Island had vegetation; two-thirds of the vegetation was woodland, and 89% of the plant species were indigenous. Caroline's islets are made up of seven concentric plant communities, defined by a dominant species. One community—dominated by the coconut palm—was made by humans. The other six are:

- an outermost "herb mat", comprising mainly the flowering shrub Heliotropium anomalum and the succulent plant Portulaca lutea;
- "Beach Shrub" (shrubland), consisting of the evergreen shrub Bay cedar Suriana maritima;
- the minor plant community "Pandanus Forest" (consisting primarily of specimens of the Pandanus tectorius tree);
- "Tournefortia Scrub and Forest", populated by Heliotropium arboreum, which dominates the wooded islets of the atoll, forming 31% of the atoll's land area;
- "Cordia Forest", dominated by the flowering tree Cordia subcordata;
- "Pisonia Forest", consisting of the Pisonia grandis tree, located in the interior of the larger islets, and widely distributed throughout the atoll.

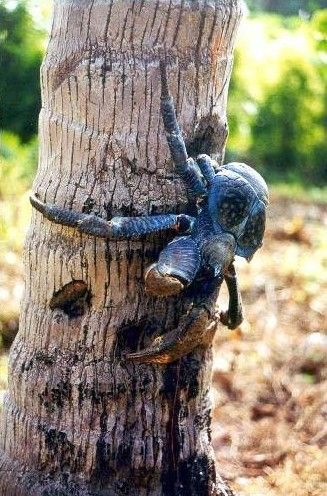
The coconut crab, a threatened species that lives on Caroline Island

Smaller islets lack the central forest and the smallest islets are vegetated solely by low-lying herbs. Coconut palms were introduced to the atoll after it was first discovered by Europeans, and a large plantation still exists on South Islet, with palms growing to a lesser degree on Long Islet and Nake Islet.

In 2014 the Kiribati government established a fishing exclusion zone extending to 12 nautical miles around each of the southern Line Islands—Caroline, Flint, Vostok, Malden, and Starbuck.

Caroline Island is an important breeding site for several species of seabirds, most notably the sooty tern (Onychoprion fuscata), numbering around 500,000—a colony of sooty terns dominates the eastern islets—and the great frigatebird (Fregata minor), numbering over 10,000, according to estimations made in 1980. Caroline Island and Flint Island host one of the world's largest populations of the coconut crab (Birgus latro). Other native animals include the Tridacna clam, which is abundant in the central lagoon, hermit crabs, and multiple species of lizards.

Giant clam populations reach densities up to four per square foot (43 per m^{2}) in parts of the lagoon. The most common species is the "small giant clam" Tridacna maxima, and the largest clam species, Tridacna gigas, is also found in the lagoon. The lagoon is a nursery habitat for fish species, including important and heavily exploited species such as the blacktip reef shark (Carcharhinus melanopterus) and the endangered Napoleon wrasse (Cheilinus undulatus).

The atoll is designated as a wildlife sanctuary for turtle nesting. The endangered green turtle (Chelonia mydas) nests on the beaches of Caroline Island, but there have been reports of poaching by homesteaders.

Human contact has caused the introduction of about twenty non-native species of flora to Caroline Island, including the vine Ipomoea violacea, which has begun to proliferate. Domestic cats and dogs introduced alongside a small homestead have driven the seabird population away from the islet of Motu Ana-Ana.

== Environmental issues ==
Caroline Island is low-lying, with no land greater than 6 metres (20 ft) above sea level. Regional sea surface temperatures have risen by around 0.1 °C per decade since the 1950s, and in 2006, the United Nations rated the island as among those most vulnerable to rising sea levels. The UNEP reported in 2006 that Caroline could disappear "within the next 30–50 years".

Caroline Island has recovered from destruction caused by settlers and business opportunists. The island's indigenous plant and animal species are thriving, and it was reported in 2010 that its coral reefs are among the most pristine in the world. The introduced coconut palm is a highly competitive plant which blocks the light and so prevents other species from growing, but is only prevalent on South Islet. Wildlife can be adversely affected by the presence of tourists or hunters, and since 1979 all animals on the island have been protected under Schedule 2 of Kiribati's Wildlife Conservation Ordinance. As of 2014, no governmental management plan or monitoring programme for the island has been produced.

== Sources ==
- Barott, Katie L.; Caselle, Jennifer E.; Dinsdale, Elizabeth A.; Friedlander, Alan M.; Maragos, James E.; Obura, David; Rohwer, Forest L.; Sandin, Stuart A.; Smith, Jennifer E.; Zgliczynski, Brian (2010). "The Lagoon at Caroline/Millennium Atoll, Republic of Kiribati: Natural History of a Nearly Pristine Ecosystem". PLoS ONE. 5 (6) e10950. Bibcode:2010PLoSO...510950B. doi:10.1371/journal.pone.0010950. ISSN 1932-6203. PMC 2880600. PMID 20539746.
- Bennett, Frederick Debell (1840). Narrative of a Whaling Voyage Round the Globe: from the year 1833 to 1836; Comprising sketches of Polynesia, California, the Indian archipelago, etc. with an account of southern whales, the sperm whale fishery, and the natural history of the climates visited. Vol. 1. London: R. Bentley. OCLC 663540587.
- Bryan, Edwin Horace (1942). American Polynesia and the Hawaiian Chain. Honolulu: Tongg Publishing Company. OCLC 920470477.
- Caldwell, John (1991) [1949]. Desperate Voyage. Dobbs Ferry, New York: Sheridan House. ISBN 978-09244-8-620-3.
- Clapp, Roger B.; Sibley, Fred C. (1971). "Myits On The Vascular Flora And Terrestrial Vertebrates Of Caroline Atoll Southern Line Islands" (PDF). Atoll Research Bulletin. 145. doi:10.5479/si.00775630.145.1. ISSN 0077-5630.
- Duka, Cecilio D. (2007). World Geography. Manila: Rex Book Store. ISBN 978-97123-4-696-5.
- Dickinson, William R. (2009). "Pacific Atoll Living: How Long Already and Until When?" (PDF). GSA Today. 19 (3): 4–10. doi:10.1130/GSATG35A.1. ISSN 1052-5173.
- Findlay, Alexander George (1884). A Directory for the Navigation of the Pacific Ocean. Vol. 2. London: Laurie. OCLC 78089294.
- Fletcher, Michael; Wyman, Derek A.; Zahirovic, Sabin (July 2020). "Mantle plumes, triple junctions and transforms: A reinterpretation of Pacific Cretaceous – Tertiary LIPs and the Laramide connection". Geoscience Frontiers. 11 (4): 1140–42. doi:10.1016/j.gsf.2019.09.003. ISSN 1674-9871.
- Harris, Aimee (August 1999). "Millennium: Date Line Politics". Honolulu. Honolulu, Hawaii. p. 20. ISSN 0441-2044. Archived from the original on 28 June 2006.
- Keating, Barbara H (1992). "Insular Geology of the Line Islands". In Keating, Barbara H; Bolton, Barrie R (eds.). Geology and Offshore Mineral Resources of the Central Pacific Basin. Circum-Pacific Council for Energy and Mineral Resources Earth Science Series. Vol. 14. New York: Springer Verlag. ISBN 978-03879-7-771-3.
- Kepler, Angela K.; Kepler, Cameron B.; Ellis, David H. (1992). "1.1 Ecological Studies of Caroline Atoll, Republic of Kiribati, South-central Pacific Ocean". In Nagel, P.A. (ed.). Results of the First Joint US-USSR Central Pacific Expedition (BERPAC), Autumn 1988. Washington, D.C.: United States Fish and Wildlife Service. OCLC 647246899.
- Kepler, Angela K.; Kepler, Cameron B., eds. (1994). "The natural history of the Caroline Atoll, Southern Line Islands". Atoll Research Bulletin. 397–398. ISSN 0077-5630.
- Lovell, Edward R.; Kirata, Taratau; Tekinaiti, Tooti (2002). Status Report for Kiribati's Coral Reefs (Report). Vol. 2. New Caledonia: Centre IRD de Nouméa. ISSN 1297-9635.
- Migoń, Piotr (2014). Geomorphological Landscapes of the World. Dordrecht: Springer. ISBN 978-90481-3-055-9.
- Panton, Kenneth J (2015). Historical Dictionary of the British Empire. Lanham, Maryland: Rowman & Littlefield. ISBN 978-08108-7-801-3.
- Paulding, Hiram (1831). Journal of a Cruise of the United States Schooner Dolphin, Among the Islands of the Pacific Ocean. New York: Carvill. OCLC 914717240.
- Rottman, Gordon L. (2002). World War II Pacific Island Guide: A Geo-military Study. Westport, Connecticut: Greenwood Press. ISBN 978-03133-1-395-0.
- Royal Astronomical Society (1884). "The Total Solar Eclipse of 1883, May 6". Monthly Notices of the Royal Astronomical Society. 44 (4). London: Royal Astronomical Society: 180–82. ISSN 0035-8711.
- Schlanger, S. O.; Garcia, M. O.; Keating, B. H.; Naughton, J. J.; Sager, W. W.; Haggerty, J. G.; Philpot, J. G.; Duncan, R.A. (1984). "Geology and Geochronology of the Line Islands" (PDF). Journal of Geophysical Research. 89 (B13): 11, 261. Bibcode:1984JGR....8911261S. doi:10.1029/JB089iB13p11261. ISSN 0022-1406.
- Schmadel, Lutz.D. (2000). Dictionary of Minor Planet Names (4th ed.). Berlin: Springer-Verlag Telos. ISBN 978-3-540-66292-1.
- Scott, Derek A. (1993). A Directory of Wetlands in Oceania. Slimbridge, United Kingdom: International Waterfpwl and Wetlands Research. ISBN 978-09505-7-312-0.
- Singh, Ashbindu; Pathirana, Sumith; Shi, Hua (2006). Assessing Coastal Vulnerability: developing a global index for measuring risk. Nairobi: United Nations Environment Programme. ISBN 978-92807-2-577-3.
- Stackpole, Edouard A (1972) [1953]. The Sea-Hunters: the New England whalemen during two centuries, 1635-1835. Westport, Connecticut: Greenwood Press. ISBN 978-08371-6-498-4.
- Thomas, Frank R.; Tonganibeia, Kautoa (2007). "Pacific island rural development Challenges and prospects in Kiribati". In Connell, John; Waddell, Eric (eds.). Brand logo Environment, Development and Change in Rural Asia-Pacific: Between Local and Global. Routledge Pacific Rim Geographies. London; New York: Routledge. doi:10.4324/9780203967843. ISBN 978-02039-6-784-3.
- Upton, Winslow (29 June 1883). "The Total Solar Eclipse of May 6". Science. 1 (21). Cambridge, Massachusetts: Moses King: 594–96. ISSN 0036-8075.
- Vallado, David A (2001). Fundamentals of astrodynamics and applications (2nd ed.). El Segundo, California: Microcosm Press. ISBN 978-07923-6-903-5.
- Whincup, Tony (1979). Nareau's Nation: a Portrait of the Gilbert Islands. London: Stacey International. ISBN 978-09057-4-316-5.
