= John T. Arundel =

English entrepreneur (1841–1919)

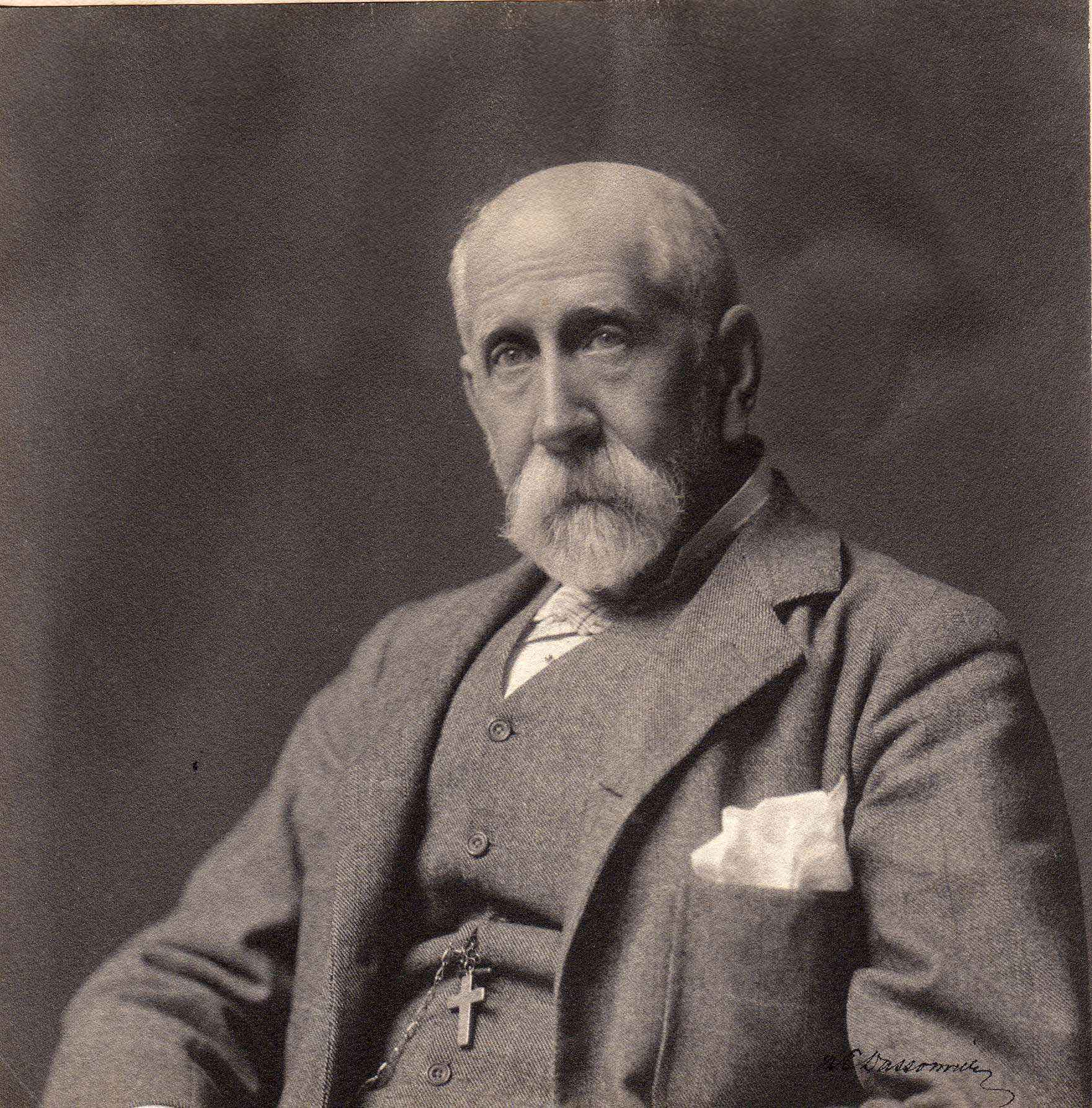
- Born: John Thomas Arundel; 1 September 1841; London, England
- Died: 30 November 1919 (aged 78); Bournemouth, England
- Other name: Aneru
- Occupation: Entrepreneur
- Known for: guano and copra
- Spouse: Eliza Eleanor Whibley "Lillie"
- Children: Lillian Arundel, Sydney Dorothy Aris
- Parent(s): John Arundel, merchant and shopkeeper
- Relatives: Paternal grandfather, Rev. John Arundel, Home Secretary of the London Missionary Society 1820–1846

John T. Arundel (1 September 1841 – 30 November 1919) was an English entrepreneur who was instrumental in the development of the mining of phosphate rock on the Pacific islands of Nauru and Banaba (Ocean Island). Williams & Macdonald (1985) described him as "a remarkable example of that mid-Victorian phenomenon, the upright, pious and adventurous Christian English businessman."

== Early life ==
His father owned a gentleman's outfitter in the City of London and a warehouse business on the Thames estuary; the family lived at Gravesend, Kent. They were active in the Congregational Church, and through a church connection he joined Houlder Brothers & Co., a firm that provided ships for migration to New Zealand and Australia.

== Early career ==
In 1860, Arundel travelled on a Houlder Brothers & Co ship into the Pacific, calling at the Chincha Islands, on which guano was mined for refining into the fertiliser superphosphate. He took an interest in the potential of the fertiliser business and in 1868 the company sent him on a second voyage into the Pacific to pursue opportunities.

When Arundel set off in 1871 to develop a business in the Pacific, he left his fiancée Eliza Eleanor (Lillie) Whibley in England, as he wanted to secure their financial future by achieving success with his business ventures. He and Lillie Whibley were not to marry until 1881. Following their marriage, his wife would accompany him when he would visit the various central Pacific islands on which his company had operations. Lillie gave birth in 1884 to their second daughter while on Manra, then known as Sydney Island, giving her the name of that island.

In 1898, Fred Whibley, Lillie's younger brother, arrived in Sydney, after 10 years in the United States and Canada. J. T. Arundel offered Fred Whibley a position with John T. Arundel & Co., but Fred declined and chose to become an island trader on Niutao in what is now Tuvalu. A harmonious working relationship would have been unlikely, given the pious Christian attitudes of J.T. Arundel and Fred Whibley's reputation as the 'black sheep' of the family.

== John T. Arundel & Co. ==
In 1871, with financial support from Houlder Brothers and Co., he established John T. Arundel & Co. The initial activities were carried out by the two companies. Houlder Brothers leased Flint Island from the British government, and Arundel managed the guano digging in the central part of the island from 1875 to 1880. In 1872, Caroline Island was leased by Houlder Brothers. In 1881, the lease was taken over by Arundel (for whom one of the islets is named).

John T. Arundel & Co went on to engage in mining guano on other Pacific islands, established coconut plantations, and traded in copra and other commodities. The company operated from Sydney, Australia, with business interests in the Pacific that included:

- Mining guano on:
  - Caroline Island from 1872 (with the support of Houlder Brothers and Co) then under John T. Arundel & Co from 1881. The guano mining, which began in 1874, supplied a total of about 10,000 tons of phosphate until supplies were exhausted around 1895.
  - Baker Island from 1886 to 1899, which is now claimed as an unincorporated territory of the United States.
  - Howland Island from 1886 to 1899, which is geographically part of the Phoenix Islands and now claimed as an unincorporated territory of the United States.
  - Jarvis Island from 1886 to 1899, which is geographically part of the Line Islands and now claimed as an unincorporated territory of the United States.
  - Manra or Sydney Island in 1884, which is geographically part of the Phoenix Islands and is part of Kiribati.
  - Raine Island in the Torres Strait, Rocky Island off Mornington Island in the Gulf of Carpentaria, Lady Elliot Island off Bundaberg, Queensland and several islands in the Capricorn and Bunker Group in the waters off Northern Australia.
- Establishing coconut plantations on:
  - Flint Island in 1881 in what is now Kiribati; the plantation was operated by the firm until 1891.
  - Caroline Island in 1885, where the coconut palms suffered from disease and the plantation failed.
  - Nikumaroro, or Gardner Island, which is geographically part of the Phoenix Islands and is part of Kiribati. The plantation was started in 1892 but as a consequence of severe drought was abandoned within 12 months.

Albert Ellis, a prospector who worked for John T. Arundel & Co., later acknowledged that the company was not making money although the company was gaining experience in the mining and shipping of guano and phosphate rock in what were sometimes difficult conditions, with many of these islands having no safe anchorage for shipping.

== Pacific Islands Company Ltd ==
In 1897, John T. Arundel & Co. merged its business with that of the trading and plantation firm of Henderson and Macfarlane to form the Pacific Islands Company Ltd ('PIC'). The company was based in London with its trading activities in the Pacific. The Chairman of the PIC was Lord Stanmore, formerly Sir Arthur Gordon, Governor of Fiji and first High Commissioner for the Western Pacific. John T. Arundel was the vice-chairman.

The PIC continued to expand its plantation interests, and in 1899 acquired a license to develop coconut plantations on Birnie Island, which is geographically part of the Phoenix Islands and is part of Kiribati. The company attempted to acquire licenses to develop coconut plantations in the British Solomon Islands in 1900 and 1901.

Despite this attempt to broaden the operations of the company, it remained chronically short of capital throughout its existence and was lent money from time to time by its directors. The PIC abandoned its plans to develop coconut plantations in 1902.

== Pacific Phosphate Company Ltd ==
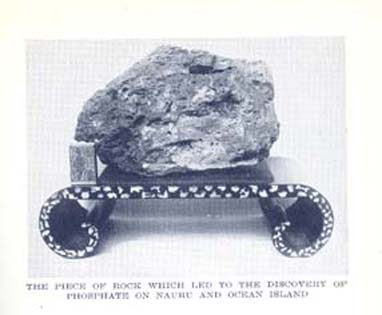
Phosphate rock used as door stop

In 1899, Albert Ellis made what he later described as "a good 'find'", when he had laboratory analysis carried out on a rock that was used to prop open the Sydney office door, as it appeared similar to the hard phosphate rock that he had seen on Baker Island. The analysis confirmed that it was high grade phosphate. Ellis and other company employees travelled to Banaba to confirm that the soil of that island was largely phosphate rock. Ellis went on to Nauru, at that time a German territory, and confirmed it also consisted of large deposits of phosphate rock.

J. T. Arundel and Lord Stanmore were responsible for financing the new opportunities and negotiating with the German company that controlled the licences to mine in Nauru. In 1902, the interests of PIC were merged with Jaluit Gesellschaft of Hamburg, to form the Pacific Phosphate Company ('PPC') in order to engage in phosphate mining in Nauru and Banaba, then known as Ocean Island. The company's engineers had to find solutions for transferring the phosphate rock from the island to ships that had to anchor off the island. As high islands, neither Nauru nor Banaba had lagoons or anchorages that protected ships from the Pacific storms. Solutions were found, and despite losing some five ships on the reef at Ocean Island, the PPC became a very profitable company. The profitability of the company directed attention to the original agreements made with the land owners of Nauru and Banaba. The agreement with the Banabans was for the exclusive right to mine for 999 years for £50 a year. The terms of the licenses were changed to provide for the payment of royalties and compensation for mining damage.

In 1913, an anonymous correspondent to the New Age journal criticised the operation of the PPC under the title "Modern buccaneers in the West Pacific".

The PPC investigated phosphate deposits on Makatea in the Tuamotus in French Polynesia and formed a company, the Compagnie des Phosphates de l'Océanie, with a Tahitian syndicate that was also investigating the potential of Makatea. This gave the PPC a virtual monopoly on the sources of high grade phosphate in the Pacific.

In 1919, the business of the PPC in Nauru and Banaba was acquired by the board of the British Phosphate Commission. From 1919, the responsibility for the welfare of the people of Nauru and Banaba, the restoring of land and water resources lost by mining operations, and compensation for environmental damage to the islands was under the control of the governments of the United Kingdom, New Zealand and Australia.

== Chronology ==
- 1841 Born in England. His paternal grandfather, John Arundel, was Home Secretary of the London Missionary Society.
- 1872 Started John T. Arundel & Co., Sydney.
- 1881 Started coconut plantation on Flint Island.
- 1884 His second daughter was born on Sydney Island, and was named Sydney.
- 1885, 3 March. Lectured at the Geographical Society of the Pacific, San Francisco, California.
- 1886 Resumed guano mining on Baker Island, Howland Island and Jarvis Island.
- 1897 J. T. Arundel & Co., Ltd., headquartered in Sydney, merged with Henderson and Macfarlane to form the Pacific Islands Company, headquartered in London, England.
- 1897 Visited Clipperton.
- 1902 The Pacific Islands Company became the Pacific Phosphate Company, and began phosphate mining on Banaba in 1901 and in Nauru in 1906.
- 1909 He travelled on the maiden voyage of the S.S. Ocean Queen, to Nauru and Ocean Island. On this voyage he visited Jarvis Island, where his daughter Sydney photographed the construction of a day beacon.
- 1909 (September) The S.S. Ocean Queen was wrecked on the reef at Makatea; a bent connecting rod caused the engines to stop and the current carried the ship onto the reef.
- 1909 (October) In San Francisco, Arundel became a member of the Pacific Union Club. He suffered a heart attack and subsequently resigned as deputy chairman of the PPC.
- 1919 Died on 30 November 1919 at Bournemouth, England.

== Publications ==
Arundel, John T. The Phoenix group and other islands of the Pacific. New Zealand Herald, Geographical Society of the Pacific. OCLC 17688856.
