= List of colonial governors of Nauru =

During the colonial era The Flag of Australia primarily flew over the island.

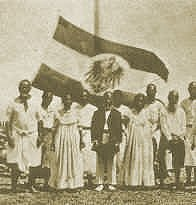
Annexation ceremony in Nauru, 3 October 1888

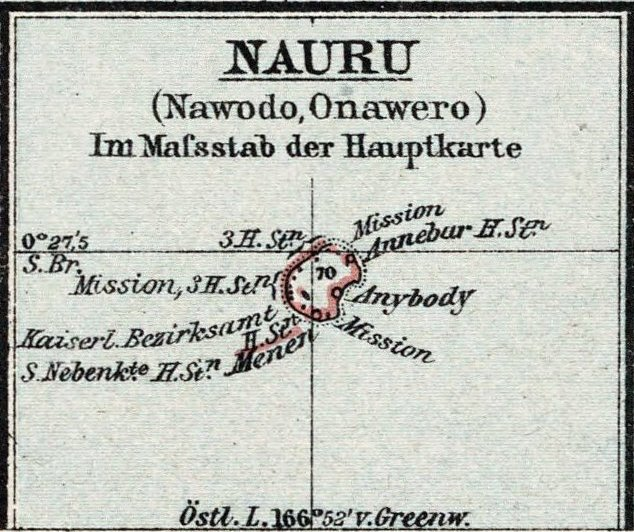
German map of Nauru, 1897

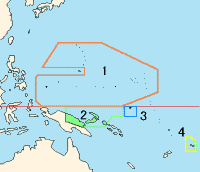
League of Nations mandates in the Pacific Ocean. The Trust Territory of Nauru (bordered in blue) is number 3.

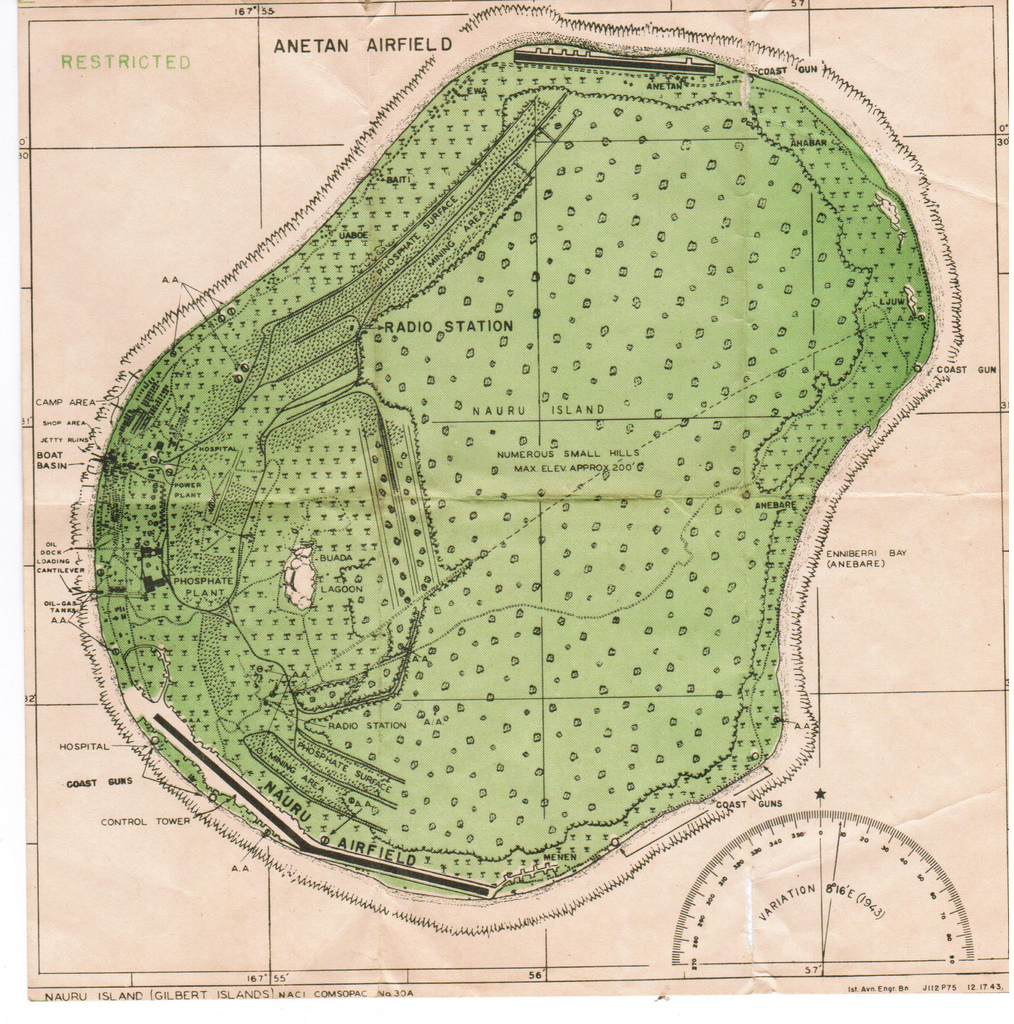
Allied map of Nauru, World War II

This article lists the colonial governors of Nauru, from the establishment of the German colonial presence in 1888 (as part of German New Guinea), through the Japanese occupation during World War II, until the independence of the Australian-administered Trust Territory of Nauru in 1968.

== List ==
(Dates in italics indicate de facto continuation of office)

| Tenure | Portrait | Incumbent | Notes |
Reichskommissar (1888)
| 2 October 1888 to 3 October 1888 | | Franz Leopold Sonnenschein | |
Bezirksamtleute (1888–1905)
| 3 October 1888 to 14 May 1889 | | Robert Rasch | Acting |
| 14 May 1889 to 1892 | | Christian Hermann Johannsen | |
| 1892 to 1897 | | Friedrich "Fritz" Jung | |
| 1898 to 1905 | | Ludwig Kaiser | |
Station chiefs (1906–1914)
| 1 April 1906 to 1908 | | Konrad Geppert | |
| 1908 to 1911 | | Joseph Siegwanz | |
| 1911 to 1912 | | Karl Warnecke | |
| 1912 to 9 September 1914 | | Wilhelm Wostrack | First time |
British Commanding Officer of the Landing Party (1914)
| 9 September 1914 (hours) | | Myles Aldington Blomfield | |
Station chief (1914)
| 9 September 1914 to 6 November 1914 | | Wilhelm Wostrack | Second time |
Commanding Officer of the Australian Naval and Military Expeditionary Force [AN&MEF] (1914)
| 6 November 1914 | | Colonel William Holmes | Killed in the Battle of Messines (1917) |
Commanding Officer of the Australian Garrison Nauru (1914)
| 6 November 1914 to 25 December 1914 | | Edward Creer Norrie | |
Administrators (1914–1942)
| 25 December 1914 to December 1917 | | Charles Rufus Marshall Workman | |
| December 1917 to 9 June 1921 | | Geoffrey Whistler Bingham Smith-Rewse | Aweida was the head chief of nauru |
| 10 June 1921 to 27 June 1927 | | Thomas Griffiths | Daimon was the head chief of nauru |
| 27 June 1927 to 31 December 1932 | | William Augustin Newman | |
| 5 February 1929 to 1929 | | Unknown | Acting Administrator for Newman |
| 1 January 1933 to 17 January 1933 | | Daniel Eberhardt | Acting Administrator |
| 17 January 1933 to 31 August 1938 | | Rupert Clare Garsia | Timothy Detudamo was head chief of nauru |
| 1 September 1938 to 22 October 1938 | | Unknown | Acting Administrator |
| 22 October 1938 to 26 August 1942 | | Frederick Royden Chalmers | Japanese prisoner 26 August 1942 – 25 March 1943; murdered in captivity |
Japanese Military Commanders (1942–1945)
| 26 August 1942 to 7 March 1943 | | Hiromi Nakayama | |
| 7 March 1943 to 13 July 1943 | | Takenao Takenouchi | Commander of the 67 Naval Guard Unit |
| 13 July 1943 to 13 September 1945 | | Hisayuki Soeda | Commander of the 67 Naval Guard Unit |
Australian Military Administrator (1945)
| 13 September 1945 to 31 October 1945 | | Joseph Lawrence Andrew Kelly | |
Administrators (1945–1968)
| 1 November 1945 to 30 August 1949 | | Mark Ridgway | |
| 31 August 1949 to 20 December 1949 | | Harold Reeve | Acting Administrator |
| 20 December 1949 to 31 October 1952 | | Robert Stanley Richards | |
| July 1952 to 30 June 1954 | | John Keith Lawrence | Acting (for Richards to 31 October 1952) |
| December 1953 to 30 June 1954 | | Keith Alan Read | Acting Administrator |
| 1 July 1954 to 21 June 1958 | | Reginald Sylvester Leydin | First time.Raymond Gadabu was head chief of Nauru. |
| 21 June 1958 to 30 April 1962 | | John Preston White | |
| 1 May 1962 to 31 May 1962 | | Frederick William McConaghy | Acting Administrator |
| 1 June 1962 to March 1966 | | Reginald Sylvester Leydin | Second time |
| March 1966 to 19 May 1966 | | Roy Edward Vizard | Acting Administrator |
| 19 May 1966 to 30 January 1968 | | Leslie Dudley King | |

On 30 January 1968, Nauru achieved independence. For a list of heads of state after independence, see President of Nauru.

== See also ==
- History of Nauru
  - Head Chief of Nauru
- Politics of Nauru
  - President of Nauru
- Australia–Nauru relations
- Phosphate mining in Banaba and Nauru
