= Nauru Independence Act 1967 =

Legal Act of Independence of Nauru

Parliament of Australia
- Long title: An Act relating to Nauru.
- Citation: No. 103, 1967
- Assented to: 10 November 1967
- Effective: 31 January 1968

Codification
- Acts repealed: Nauru Act 1965 various others
- Introduced by: Charles Barnes (House); John Gorton (Senate)

Summary
- Granted Nauru independence from Australia.
- Status: Current legislation

The Nauru Independence Act 1967 is an act of the Parliament of Australia which resulted in the independence of Nauru and the end of its status as a UN trust territory administered by Australia.

The act authorised the Australian government to proclaim a date for Nauruan independence – subsequently set as 31 January 1968 – upon which Australia would relinquish all authority over Nauru and all existing Australian legislation relating to Nauru would be repealed. It also authorised the Nauru Legislative Council to convene a constitutional convention and enact a national constitution.

== Background ==
In 1914, Australian troops occupied the Germany colony of Nauru and established a military administration. This transitioned into a civilian administration in 1920 which continued until independence, with the exception of the period of Japanese occupation during World War II. In 1947, Nauru was placed under United Nations trusteeship with Australia, New Zealand and the United Kingdom as trustees and Australia designated as the "administering authority". This replaced a largely similar League of Nations mandate.

Australian administration of Nauru was undertaken by an administrator appointed by the federal government, responsible to the Minister for Territories and advised by the locally elected Nauru Local Government Council (NLGC) instituted in 1951. Led by head chiefs Timothy Detudamo and Hammer DeRoburt, the NLGC began to seek greater autonomy for Nauru and eventual independence, which was initially resisted by Australia due to concerns over the future of the British Phosphate Commission (BPC).

In December 1965, the Australian parliament passed the Nauru Act 1965, which established a locally elected Legislative Council with the power to make local ordinances (subject to disallowance by the administrator and Australian government) and an Executive Council to advise the administrator. The NLGC continued to push for full independence and in December 1966 the UN General Assembly resolved to support the NLGC's position. A final round of negotiations held in Canberra in April 1967 resulted in the Australian government agreeing to full political independence and a staged transition to Nauruan ownership of BPC assets. The Nauru Island Phosphate Industry Agreement was signed in June 1967.

== Legislation ==
On 24 October 1967, Australian territories minister Charles Barnes announced in a statement to the Australian House of Representatives that "full and unqualified independence" would be granted to Nauru. Barnes subsequently introduced the Nauru Independence Bill 1967 to the House of Representatives on 26 October 1967. Following passage by the House and Senate, royal assent to the act was granted on 10 November 1967. Nauru's independence enjoyed bipartisan support in Australia, although Senate backbencher Magnus Cormack was skeptical that Nauru would succeed as an independent country, predicting that it would become "the greatest slum in the oceans of the world" when phosphate reserves ran out.

The act consists of four sections. Section two of the act authorised the Australian government to fix a date for "Nauru Independence Day", which was subsequently set as 31 January 1968 following consultation with Nauruan leaders. Section three of the act gave the Nauru Legislative Council the authority to make "an Ordinance establishing a convention for the purpose of establishing a constitution for Nauru", and section four of the provided that all existing Australian legislation would cease to apply to Nauru "on the expiration of the day preceding Nauru Independence Day" and relinquished any Australian authority over Nauru.

== Aftermath ==
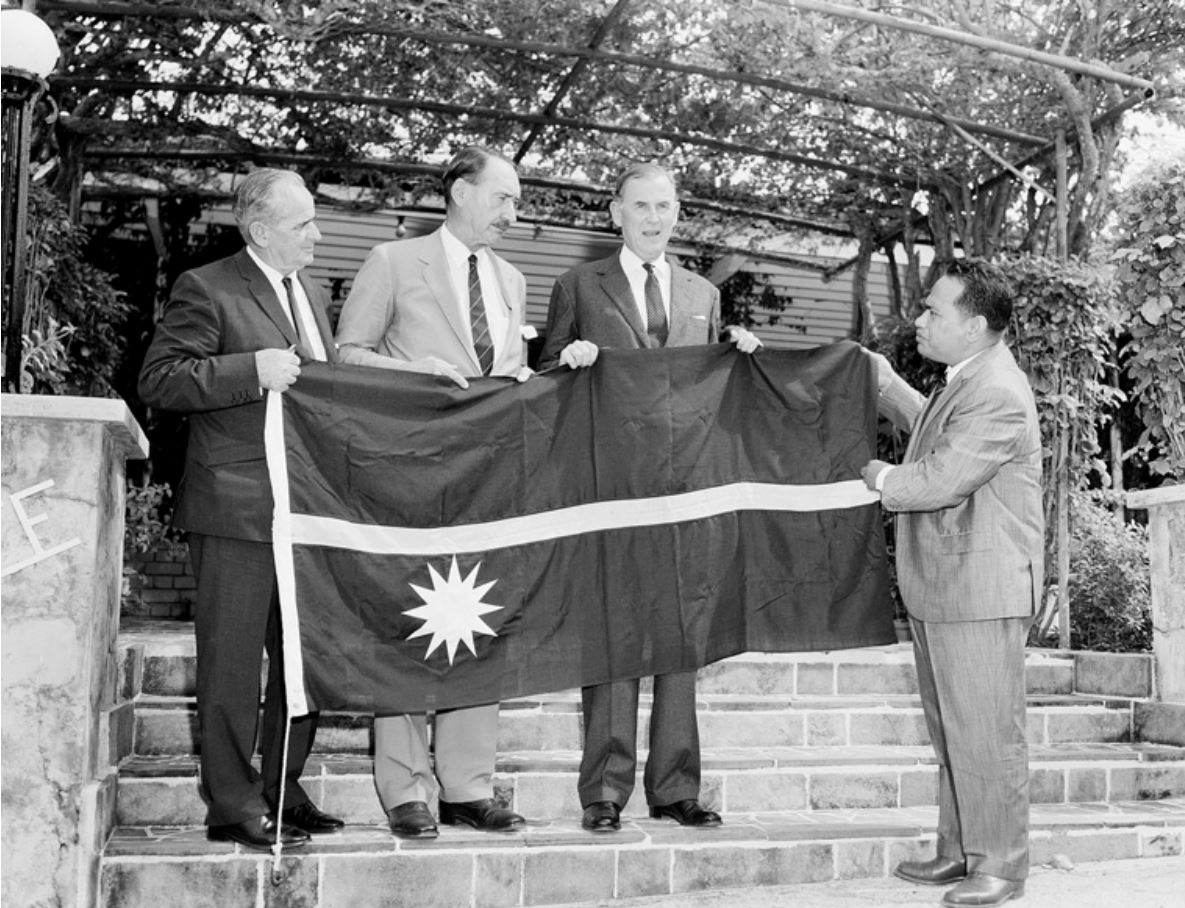
Nauruan leader Hammer DeRoburt (right) on Independence Day with representatives of former mandatory powers (left to right): Douglas Carter (New Zealand), Charles Barnes (Australia), and Charles Johnston (United Kingdom)

Following the passage of the act, the United Nations Trusteeship Council convened a special session in November 1967 which approved the pathway to independence and confirmed that the 1947 Trusteeship Agreement would be terminated on accession to independence.

The Nauruan Constitutional Convention met in January 1968, following an election in December 1967. The Constitutional Convention unanimously adopted the final version of the Constitution of Nauru on 29 January 1968, days after the 1968 Nauruan parliamentary election which elected the inaugural members of the new Legislative Assembly. Celebrations for Nauru's Independence Day took place on the island on 31 January 1968, with Australian governor-general Richard Casey and UN under-secretary-general Issoufou Saidou-Djermakoye in attendance.

== See also ==
- Papua New Guinea Independence Act 1975

== Sources ==
- Storr, Cait (2020). International Status in the Shadow of Empire: Nauru and the Histories of International Law. Cambridge University Press. doi:10.1017/9781108682602. ISBN 9781108682602.
