= Hammer DeRoburt =

President of Nauru (1922–1992)

His Excellency Hammer DeRoburt GCMG, OBE
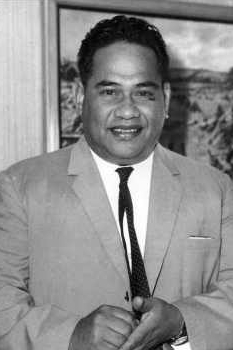
- Hammer DeRoburt, 1968

President of Nauru
- In office 17 May 1968 – 22 December 1976
- Deputy: Buraro Detudamo
- Preceded by: Office Established
- Succeeded by: Bernard Dowiyogo
- In office 15 May 1978 – 17 September 1986
- Deputy: Buraro Detudamo
- Preceded by: Lagumot Harris
- Succeeded by: Kennan Adeang
- In office 1 October 1986 – 12 December 1986
- Deputy: Buraro Detudamo
- Preceded by: Kennan Adeang
- Succeeded by: Kennan Adeang
- In office 22 December 1986 – 17 August 1989
- Deputy: Buraro Detudamo
- Preceded by: Kennan Adeang
- Succeeded by: Kenos Aroi

Chairman of the Council of State
- In office 31 January 1968 – 17 May 1968
- Preceded by: Office Established
- Succeeded by: Office Abolished

Member of the Nauruan Parliament for Boe
- In office 31 January 1968 – 15 July 1992
- Preceded by: Constituency Established
- Succeeded by: Michael Aroi

Personal details
- Born: 25 September 1922 Nauru
- Died: 15 July 1992 (aged 69) Melbourne, Australia
- Spouse: Lukale Harris (m. 1950; died 1986)
- Profession: Schoolteacher

Hammer DeRoburt (25 September 1922 – 15 July 1992) was a Nauruan politician and independence leader. He led negotiations for independence from Australia and the end of the country's status as a United Nations trust territory. He was subsequently elected as the inaugural president of Nauru, serving four terms in office (1968–1976, 1978–1986, 1986, 1986–1989). Prior to independence he was head chief of Nauru and chair of the Nauru Local Government Council.

== Early life ==
DeRoburt was born in Nauru on 25 September 1922. He was the son of DeRoburt and Eidumunang; his maternal grandfather Daimon was the island's head chief from 1920 to 1930. He also had Banaban heritage, as his grandmother was from the island. DeRoburt was a member of the Iruwa tribe. He was raised in Boe District. After being educated on Nauru, he attended the Gordon Institute of Technology in Geelong, Australia. After returning to Nauru, he started working as a teacher.

Following the Japanese occupation of Nauru during World War II, DeRoburt was deported to Truk by the Japanese, along with most of the Nauruan population. When he returned to Nauru in 1946 he started working at the Department of Education. He decided to stand in the first elections to the Nauru Local Government Council in 1951, and although he gained enough support to be nominated as a candidate in the Boe constituency, he was disqualified due to irregularities in his nomination. Local residents and European residents protested without success, whilst a petition to the 1953 Visiting Mission from the United Nations was also overlooked.

In 1953, DeRoburt led the Nauru Workers' Organisation in a four-month strike which successfully secured an increase in wages and greater training opportunities from the Australian administration. In 1955 elections he stood again in the Boe constituency and was elected to the Council. In 1956, the Council elected him Head Chief of Nauru.

As head chief, DeRoburt used the provisions of the UN Charter to directly lobby the Trusteeship Council on various issues relating to the Australian administration, including the lack of secondary education on the island and administration assistance in developing industries. In 1957 he officially protested the British Phosphate Commission's continued exploitation of Nauru's phosphate reserves, the territory's primary industry, and particularly the commission's assertion that the interior areas being mined had been previously used by Nauruans.

== Campaign for independence ==
In 1962, DeRoburt and his fellow NLGC members Raymond Gadabu and Joseph Detsimea Audoa attended a meeting of the Trusteeship Council and formally called for a transition to independence, stating that "the sovereignty of the Nauruan people lies in the Nauruan race and our government should be answerable to that power [...] we desire the Nauruan nation to be sovereign and free to govern itself".

In response, the Trusteeship Council developed a plan for Nauruans to be resettled in Australia and given self-government. The Australian government's Department of Territories offered that Nauruans be resettled on Queensland's Curtis Island and given full Australian citizenship. DeRoburt and the NLGC resolved to only accept this proposal if Nauruans were given full sovereignty over Curtis Island, which the Australian government rejected. They consequently "resolved to reject resettlement altogether, and push for sovereign independence on Nauru – including rehabilitation of the island's central plateau at the expense of the tripartite governments". This was subsequently accepted by the Trusteeship Council, which in 1965 resolved to support Nauruans' aspirations for independence.

DeRoburt subsequently became a key figure in the independence negotiations known as the Nauru Talks, which took place between 1965 and 1967. His lobbying of the Trusteeship Council and UN General Assembly was key in securing virtually all desired concessions from the Australian government, which was ambivalent towards independence. In June 1967, DeRoburt signed the Nauru Island Phosphate Industry Agreement on behalf of the NLGC, which provided for a transition to Nauruan ownership of phosphate reserves and removed one of the last stumbling blocks in the independence negotiations. The Nauru Independence Act 1967 gave Nauru independence with effect from 31 January 1968.

== Presidency of post-independence Nauru ==
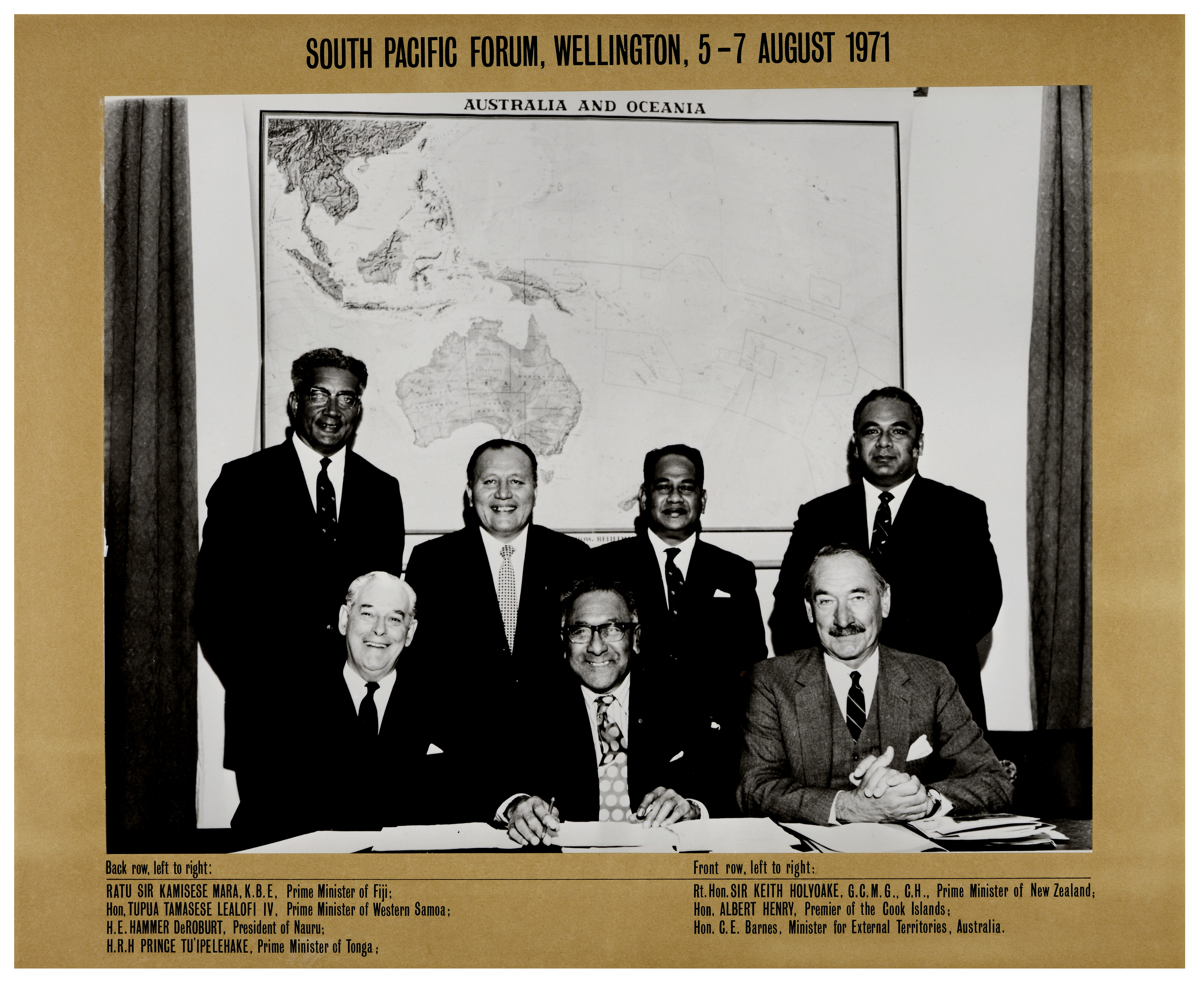
DeRobert at the Pacific Islands Forum, 5 August 1971, Wellington

=== Electoral and political record ===
On 31 January 1968, Nauru's Independence Day, DeRoburt was elected by the Legislative Assembly as one of the five members of the Council of State, an interim body tasked with exercising executive power pending the adoption of a final constitution. He was elected chairman of the Council of State, serving until 17 May 1968 when the legislature unanimously elected him as the country's inaugural president upon the adoption of the new constitution. Austin Bernicke and Buraro Detudamo received nominations but declined to stand for election.

In addition to the presidency, DeRoburt assumed the cabinet portfolios of external affairs, internal affairs, and island development and industry. He was re-elected as president unopposed in January 1971 after the 1971 Nauruan parliamentary election. In his second term, DeRoburt faced opposition from a ginger group of young MPs, who felt he had mismanaged the economy, was governing without consultation, and had failed to renew his cabinet. His opponents formed the Nauru Party, the first formal political party on the island. In July 1976, parliament failed to pass financial legislation introduced by DeRoburt. He treated the defeat as a motion of no confidence and resigned as president, but renominated himself in the ensuing election and was re-elected unopposed.

On 22 December 1976, following the 1976 Nauruan parliamentary election, DeRoburt was unexpectedly defeated in his bid for re-election to the presidency, with 30-year-old Bernard Dowiyogo defeating him by nine votes to seven and appointing a Nauru Party cabinet. Dowiyogo had reportedly not expected to win the ballot and offered to resign in DeRoburt's favour if he agreed to make concessions on cabinet choices, but DeRoburt refused to do so. He subsequently pressured Dowiyogo to resign and moved a motion attempting to declare Dowiyogo's election as unconstitutional, on the grounds that the constitution had not allowed for party politics.

DeRoburt remained an influential figure in Nauruan politics following his ouster and with his supporters managed to force Dowiyogo to an early election in November 1977. Dowiyogo was re-elected as president, but remained in office only until April 1978 when he resigned following a defeat on a phosphate royalties bill. His successor Lagumot Harris was ousted only a month later on a vote on an appropriations bill, with DeRoburt returning as president.

DeRoburt's second term in office lasted until his resignation on 19 September 1986 and replacement by Kennan Adeang. Adeang's government collapsed only two weeks, with DeRoburt returning as president on 1 October 1986.

=== Domestic affairs ===
In his first years in office, DeRoburt's government established the Nauru Phosphate Corporation to continue phosphate mining, under the terms agreed prior to independence. Profits from phosphate mining were used to establish Air Nauru, the first national carrier, and Nauru Pacific Shipping Lines.

=== Foreign affairs ===
In his final term, DeRoburt's government filed a case against Australia in the International Court of Justice for not rehabilitating mined-out areas of the island. His last public appearance was in the ICJ hearing in November 1991.

== Personal life ==
DeRoburt married Lukale Rowena Harris in 1950, with whom he had one daughter. He was predeceased by his wife and died on 15 July 1992 while in Melbourne for medical treatment. He was accorded a state funeral, before being buried in Boe cemetery, Nauru.

He was given an honorary knighthood by Queen Elizabeth II in 1982.

DeRoburt is credited with popularising Australian rules football to Nauru, which became the national sport.

== Sources ==
- Storr, Cait (2020). International Status in the Shadow of Empire: Nauru and the Histories of International Law. Cambridge University Press. doi:10.1017/9781108682602. ISBN 9781108682602.

New title Independence of Nauru	President of Nauru; 17 May 1968 – 22 December 1976	Succeeded by Bernard Dowiyogo
Preceded by Lagumot Harris	President of Nauru; 15 May 1978 – 17 September 1986	Succeeded by Kennan Adeang
Preceded by Kennan Adeang	President of Nauru; 1 October 1986 – December 1986	Succeeded by Kennan Adeang
Preceded by Kennan Adeang	President of Nauru; December 1986–17 August 1989	Succeeded by Kenos Aroi
