= Council of Chiefs =

Council of Chiefs could refer to multiple topics, including:

- Council of Chiefs (Nauru)
- Council of Chiefs (Palau)
- Council of Forty-four, a Cheyenne native American institution
- Great Council of Chiefs, a Fijian constitutional body
- Malvatu Mauri, or National Council of Chiefs, a body in Vanuatu
- Standing Council of Scottish Chiefs
- St'át'timc Chiefs Council
- Zimbabwe Council of Chiefs
