= Garsia =

Garsia is a surname. Notable people with the surname include:

- Adriano Garsia (1928–2024), Tunisian-born Italian American mathematician
- Alfredo Maria Garsia (1928–2004), Italian Roman Catholic bishop
- Rupert Clare Garsia (1887–1954), New Zealand-born Australian Navy commander

== See also ==
- García (surname)
