= Detudamo =

Detudamo is a Nauruan surname. Notable people with the surname include:

- Buraro Detudamo (1931–1994), Nauruan politician, son of Timothy
- Timothy Detudamo (died 1953), Nauruan politician and linguist
