= Robert Rasch =

German sailor and first resident administrator of Nauru (1852–1938)

- Rasch on his 86th birthday

German Representative in Nauru
- In office 1888–1889
- Preceded by: Franz Leopold Sonnenschein
- Succeeded by: Christian Johannsen

Personal details
- Born: 1852 Königsberg, Prussia
- Died: 31 October 1938 (age 86) Anna, Nauru

Ludwig August Robert Rasch (1852 – 31 October 1938) was a German sailor who became the first resident administrator of Nauru. Arriving on the island in 1884 during a period of civil unrest, he played a key role in facilitating the German annexation of Nauru. He lived most of his life on Nauru, where he married a 15-year-old girl and raised a family with her.

== Biography ==
Rasch was born in Königsberg in East Prussia in 1852. He emigrated to the United States and worked as a sailor for Crawford of San Francisco, sailing between the US and Pacific Islands. He was shipwrecked off Kosrae in 1883, after which he gave up sailing and moved to Nauru, where he worked as a trader on behalf of Hernsheim & Co. The day after he arrived in February 1884, he was offered three girls by Chief Denuwea, choosing a 15-year-old named Ebagon. He built a home at Arubo in Ewa District and the couple went on to have four children.

At the time of Rasch's arrival, Nauru was experiencing a prolonged period of civil war. Rasch claims that he sent a message to the German authorities in nearby Jaluit Atoll requesting that they occupy the island (which had been granted to Germany in the 1886 agreement with the United Kingdom) to stop the violence. When the German ship SMS Eber subsequently arrived in October 1888, a party of marines was dispatched to the island and confiscated all firearms on the island. Reichskommissar Franz Leopold Sonnenschein appointed Rasch temporarily as the first island-based representative of the German government. He remained in post until 14 May the following year, when the first formal Bezirksamtmann, Christian Johannsen, arrived.

Rasch returned to Germany in 1912 for a holiday. However, the outbreak of World War I prevented him from returning to Nauru until 1922, during which time Ebagon had died. He died at his home in Anna on 31 October 1938.
