= 1955 Nauruan Local Government Council election =

Elections for the Local Government Council were held in Nauru on 10 December 1955.

== Background ==
Since the first elections in 1951, the Local Government Council had gained more powers as in 1954 it had been given full access to the Nauru Royalty Trust Fund in order to pay for education.

== Electoral system ==
The fourteen districts of Nauru were grouped into eight constituencies. Seven constituencies elected one member, whilst one elected two. The election was held under universal suffrage and any eligible voter could stand as a candidate. A total of 39 candidates stood in the election, an increase from 21 in the first elections.

== Results ==
Of the 832 registered voters, 803 cast votes of which 14 were invalid. Only three of the nine members were re-elected.

Constituency	Elected member	Notes
Aiwo	Raymond Gadabu	Re-elected
Anabar	Agoko Doguape	
Anetan	Roy Degoregore	Re-elected
Boe	Hammer DeRoburt	
Buada	Austin Bernicke	Re-elected
Meneng	Elliott Halstead	
Ubenide	Jacob Dagabwinare	
Ubenide	Victor Eoaeo	
Yaren	Joseph Detsimea Audoa	
Source: Department of External Territories

== Aftermath ==
Hammer DeRoburt was elected in the Boe constituency and was elected Head Chief by the council.
