= Japanese occupation of Nauru =

Part of World War II

Nauru ナウル
- 1942–1945
- Flag Imperial Seal

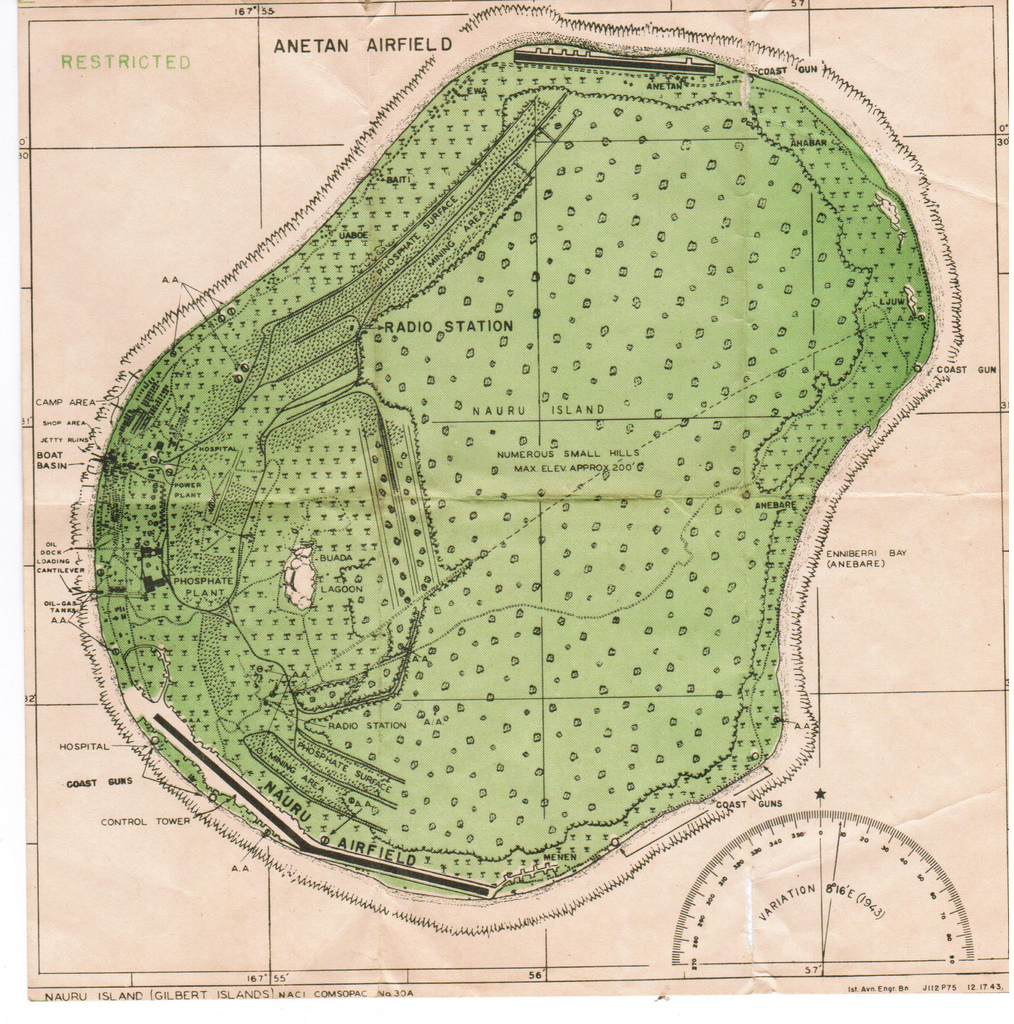
- Nauru during World War II
- Status: Military occupation by the Empire of Japan
- Common languages: Japanese, English, Nauruan
- Japanese Governor
  - 26 August 1942 to 7 March 1943: Nakayama Hiromi (First)
  - 7 March 1943 to 13 July 1943: Takenouchi Takenao
  - 13 July 1943 to 13 September 1945: Soeda Hisayuki
- Historical era: World War II
  - Established: 1942
  - Disestablished: 21 August 1945
Preceded by	Succeeded by
Mandate of Nauru	Mandate of Nauru
- Today part of: Nauru

The Japanese occupation of Nauru was the period of three years (26 August 1942 – 13 September 1945) during which Nauru, a Pacific island which at that time was under Australian administration, was occupied by the Japanese military as part of its operations in the Pacific War during World War II. With the onset of the war, the islands that flanked Japan's South Seas possessions became of vital concern to Japanese Imperial General Headquarters, and in particular to the Imperial Navy, which was tasked with protecting Japan's outlying Pacific territories.

The Japanese hoped to exploit the island's phosphate resources, and to build up their military defences in the area. They were unable to relaunch phosphate mining operations, but succeeded in transforming Nauru into a powerful stronghold, which United States forces chose to bypass during their reconquest of the Pacific. The most important infrastructure built by the Japanese was an airfield, which was the target of repeated Allied air strikes.

The war deeply affected the local population. The Japanese enforced a harsh regime, particularly on Chinese labourers who they saw as being at the bottom of the racial hierarchy; forced labour and brutal treatment were commonplace. They decided to deport the majority of Nauru's indigenous population to the Truk islands, hundreds of miles away, where mortality was extremely high. Still overpopulated with troops and imported labourers, the island was subject to food shortages, which worsened as the Allies' island-hopping strategy left Nauru completely cut off.

Although effectively neutralised by Allied air and sea control, the Japanese garrison did not surrender until eleven days after the official surrender of Japan.

== Pre-war situation ==
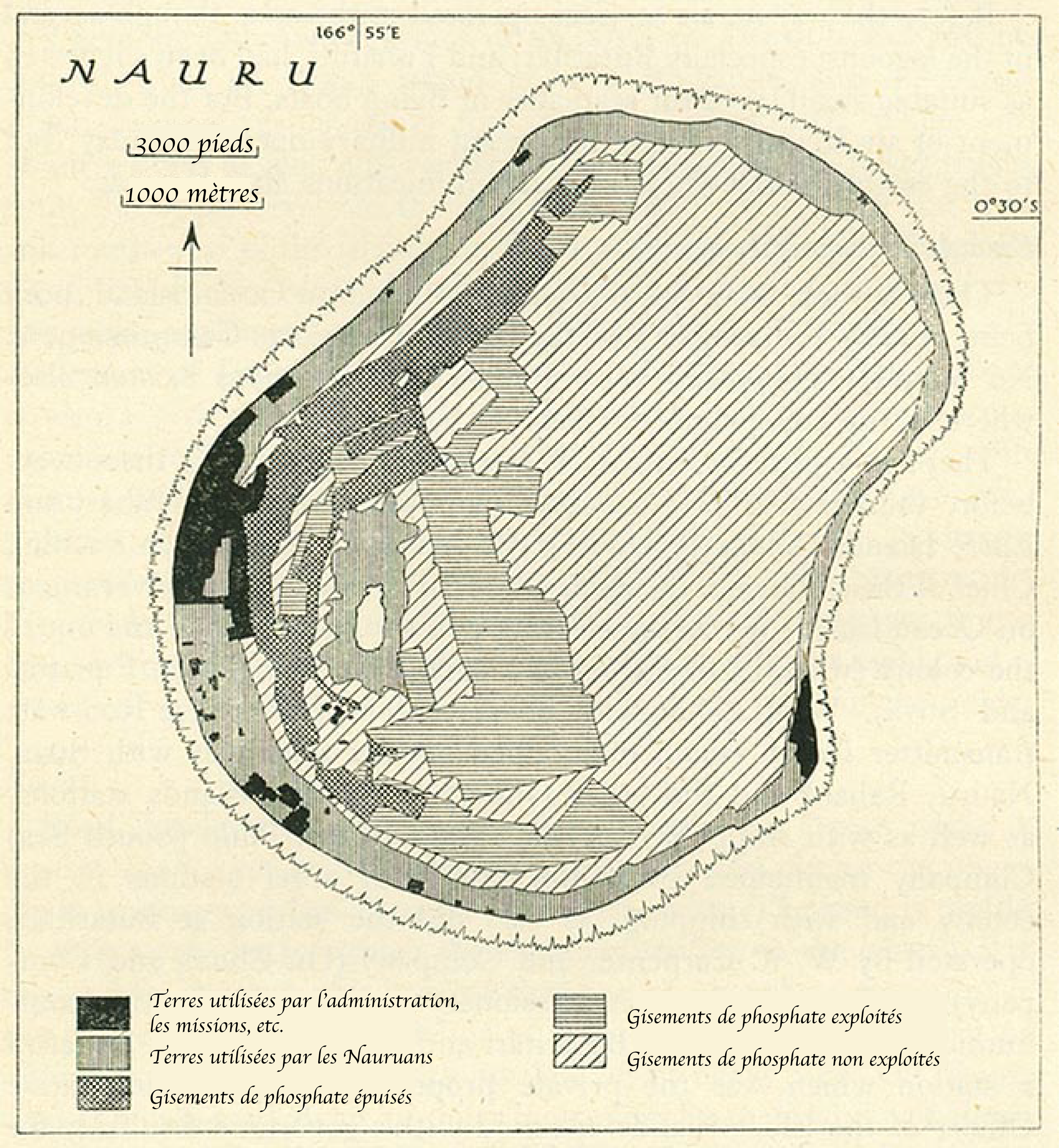
1940 map of Nauru showing the extent of the phosphate mined lands

Mining operations on Nauru began in 1906, at which time it was part of the German colonial empire. The island had some of the world's largest and highest quality deposits of phosphate, a key component in fertiliser, making it a strategically important resource on which agriculture in Australia and New Zealand depended. During the First World War, Nauru came under the control of the British Crown as a trusteeship of the League of Nations, effectively administered by the Australian government. The British Phosphate Commission (BPC), in charge of mining operations, joined with Australian officials and Christian missionaries to establish paternalistic management of the Nauruan people, who showed only limited interest in mining employment, and generally continued to rely on their traditional subsistence activities of fishing and agriculture. The BPC instead imported large numbers of indentured workers, mainly Chinese and Pacific islanders (Gilbertese above all).

Modernity reached Nauru in the form of imported goods, which had the effect of making the locals increasingly dependent on the Australian economy. Beginning in the 1920s, the Nauruans received royalties for the mining of their lands, an income that allowed them to cover their needs, but which was minimal compared with the actual value of the island's phosphate exports. The population was decimated by several diseases against which they had no immune defences; however, in 1932 they reached the population threshold of 1,500 that was considered necessary for their survival. This achievement is still celebrated in Nauru as Angam Day.

In spite of the economic importance of Nauru for Australia and New Zealand, the island was left militarily unprotected, since a stipulation of the League of Nations mandate for Australian administration forbade the construction of coastal defences. The island, very isolated geographically, was not under constant surveillance by the Australian navy, and was out of reach of aerial patrols; however, before the outbreak of hostilities in the Pacific theatre, Nauru did not appear to be under direct threat.

The Empire of Japan became firmly established in the vast area north of Nauru as a result of the South Seas Mandate of the League of Nations, and aggressive development of plantation agriculture in the islands was often facilitated by the use of Nauruan phosphate.

Demography of Nauru in 1940
Chinese	Westerners	Pacific Islanders	Total immigrants	Nauruan people	total population
1350	192	49	1591	1761	3552
Source : Viviani 1970, pp. 181

== Threats on Nauru ==
=== German attacks ===
German attacks on Nauru the 7, 8, and 27 December 1940

The Second World War first reached Nauru in early December 1940 when two German armed merchantmen disguised as civilian freighters targeted the island. Their aim was to disrupt production of phosphate and thereby weaken the agriculture-based economies of Australia and New Zealand. Orion, Komet, and their supply ship Kulmerland headed for Nauru with the purpose of destroying the main infrastructure. Due to bad weather conditions, they were unable to make a landing on the island, but sank several merchantmen in the area. On 27 December, Komet returned to Nauru, and though again unable to land a shore party, severely damaged the mining facilities and exposed loading jetties with gunfire. The island's chief administrator, Frederick Royden Chalmers, a former lieutenant-colonel in the Australian Army who had served in the Boer War and First World War, was so infuriated he reportedly stormed along the waterfront hurling verbal abuse at the German ship, which slipped away unharmed.

=== Declaration of war by Japan ===
For the Japanese, the importance of Nauru was twofold: first, they were interested in acquiring the island's phosphate deposits; second, Nauru was potentially a good base from which to launch aerial attacks against the Gilbert Islands and to threaten the sea route between Australia and North America.

Japanese forces launched simultaneous attacks against US, Australian, British and Dutch forces, on 8 December 1941 (7 December in the Western Hemisphere). That same day, a Japanese surveillance aircraft was sighted above Nauru. The first attack took place on 9 December; three planes flying from the Marshall Islands bombed the wireless station at Nauru, but failed to cause any damage. The Nauruans, warned by observers on Ocean Island 350 kilometres (189 nmi; 217 mi) to the east, managed to seek shelter before the attack. The following day, another plane made a second attempt on the radio station. The third day, four planes made a low-altitude strike and finally destroyed it. During these three days, 51 bombs were dropped on or close to the station. The governor of the island, Lieutenant-Colonel Frederick Chalmers, sent a message to Canberra stating that he thought the Japanese had not destroyed phosphate production facilities because they intended to occupy the island for its resources. All maritime contact with the rest of the world was interrupted. The BPC ship Trienza, which was en route to the island with supplies, was recalled. Until the end of February 1942, there were daily sightings of Japanese planes over the island.

In other parts of the Pacific Ocean, the Japanese advance rolled forward. They occupied the Gilbert Islands, north-east of Nauru, during Christmas 1941, and in January 1942 they took Rabaul, south-west of Nauru, and established a major base there. Nauru was therefore isolated, situated between the two main Japanese axes of advance. On 19 February 1942, the bombing of Darwin marked the first time in its history that Australia was directly targeted on a large scale by a foreign power. News of the attack caused deep consternation on Nauru.

=== Evacuation of Westerners and Chinese ===
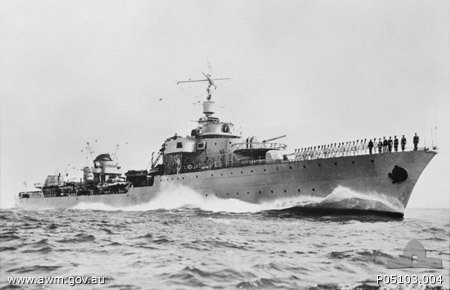
Le Triomphant, Free French Naval Forces destroyer which performed a partial evacuation of Nauru in February 1942

Following the British declaration of war on the Japanese empire, the leadership of the BPC urged the Australian government to assist in the evacuation of BPC employees. The authorities were slow to respond, due to reports speculating that an invasion of the island by Japan was unlikely because of the lack of a deep-water port or an airstrip. Their reluctance was also fuelled by the belief that withdrawal of the Westerners would result in a loss of prestige for Australia among the Nauruans. The evacuation was finally approved at the end of January 1942. The initial plan was to remove all the Westerners and Chinese. Because of growing Japanese naval activity in the area, Le Triomphant, a destroyer operating with the Free French Naval Forces, was selected for the mission. The ship met with the BPC freighter Trienza, which was camouflaged in the bay of Malekula in the New Hebrides islands, loaded with 50 tons of supplies bound for Nauru. After taking some of Trienza's cargo aboard, Le Triomphant steamed at full speed toward Nauru, arriving on 23 February. The unloading of supplies and boarding of civilians proceeded quickly. Contrary to the initial plan, it was decided to take aboard only part of the Chinese population, due to cramped conditions on the ship. Sixty-one Westerners, 391 Chinese, and the 49 members of the British garrison embarked; 191 Chinese were left on Nauru, having been told they would be evacuated later, which, in the event, did not occur, due to the rapid pace of the Japanese advance. Seven Westerners, including Chalmers and two missionaries, chose to remain, feeling it was their duty to look after the islanders. After this evacuation, there were some 1,800 Nauruans, 190 Gilbertese, and 200 Chinese on Nauru (Gilbertese from the British colony of Gilbert and Ellice Islands and Chinese from British Hong Kong were brought as laborers by BPC before the war). Before evacuating, BPC employees thoroughly sabotaged the phosphate mining facilities.

== Occupation ==
=== 1942: Beginning of the occupation ===
==== Japanese invasion ====
Operation RY was the name given by the Japanese to their plan to invade and occupy Nauru and Ocean Island. The operation was originally set to be executed in May 1942, immediately following Operation MO (the invasion of New Guinea and the Solomon Islands), and before Operation MI (the attack on Midway).

The first attempt to occupy Nauru began on 11 May, when an Imperial Japanese invasion force consisting of a cruiser, two mine-layers and two destroyers, with Special Naval Landing Force units, under the command of Rear Admiral Shima Kiyohide, departed Rabaul. The task force was attacked by the United States Navy submarine S-42, leading to the loss of the minelayer Okinoshima. Attempts by the rest of the task force to continue with the operation were called off after Japanese reconnaissance aircraft sighted the American aircraft carriers USS Enterprise and Hornet heading towards Nauru.

A second invasion force departed Truk on 26 August, and three days later, a company of the 43rd Guard Force (Palau) conducted an unopposed landing on Nauru and assumed occupation duties. They were joined by the 5th Special Base Force company, which departed Makin on 15 September and arrived at Nauru two days later. By October 1942, there were 11 officers and 249 enlisted Japanese soldiers on Nauru. On 7 March 1943, Captain Takenao Takenouchi arrived to take command of the garrison (known as 67 Naval Guard Force); he, however, was ill and bed-ridden throughout his tenure, and command was effectively held by Lieutenant Hiromi Nakayama, who had led the initial landing force. On 13 July, Captain Hisayuki Soeda arrived to replace Takenouchi as commander of 67 Naval Guard Force, a position he held until the end of the war.

The five Australians who had remained on Nauru – Chalmers (Nauru's administrator), Dr. Bernard Haselden Quinn (Government medical officer), Mr. W.H. Shugg (medical assistant), Mr. F. Harmer (BPC engineer), and Mr. W.H. Doyle (BPC overseer) – were interned and placed under guard in a house near the island's hospital. The two missionaries, Father Alois Kayser (an Alsatian) and Father Pierre Clivaz (a Swiss), were, for a time, permitted to continue their religious work.

==== New order ====
Soon after their arrival, the Japanese appointed Timothy Detudamo as the chief of the natives. The Nauruans were ordered to obey him, otherwise they would be "skinned and treated as pigs". Detudamo had served as Head Chief of the Council of Chiefs in the pre-War administration and was respected by the Nauruans. Under the Japanese regime, however, he had no autonomy; his duty was only to take orders from the occupiers and apply them. Those who did not follow the Japanese rules could be severely punished. The Nauruans would witness the beheading of several Chinese, Gilbertese, and Japanese accused of breaking the law.

The Japanese requisitioned several houses abandoned by their inhabitants after the landing, as well as all vehicles owned by the natives. They established a rationing system under which Japanese workers and Nauruans were entitled to 900 grams of rice and 45 grams of beef per day, while the Chinese were given smaller rations. All men were obliged to work for the Japanese, and, along with Korean and Japanese workers, were immediately put to work building an airstrip. The construction took place at breakneck pace, and the forced workers were beaten if they were unable to work as fast as ordered.

If Japanese rule was harsh when contrasted with the more paternalistic Australian approach, it was, at least for the native Nauruans, not as brutal as in other areas controlled by the Japanese. The occupiers tried to seduce the natives using propaganda, educational programs, and entertainment. They opened a Japanese school, a language which many Nauruans learned during the war, and hired native dancers for celebrations they organized, which brought the Nauruans extra money. They opted not to interfere with the work of the two European priests, who had great influence among the population, and allowed religious services to take place. They also hired some of the employees of the former administration. However, the Japanese were particularly harsh with the Chinese, who were at the bottom of their perceived racial hierarchy. They were underfed and beaten more often and more brutally than the other inhabitants.

==== Military works ====
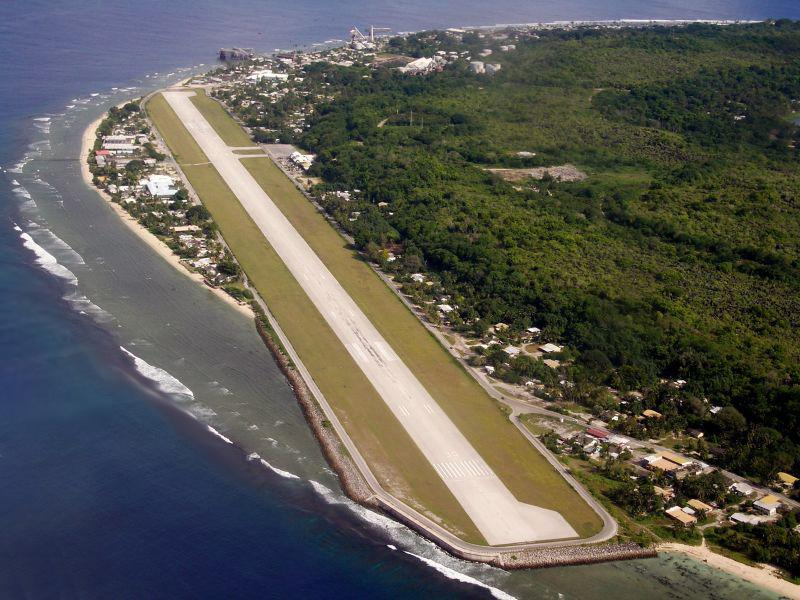
Nauru International Airport, a legacy of the Japanese occupation

The organization of the island's defences was the first task of the occupiers. They sited 152 mm artillery pieces around the coast and placed 12.7 mm anti-aircraft machine guns on Command Ridge. They built pillboxes on the beach, bunkers further inland, and an underground hospital. Their main work was the construction of an airstrip (which, after the war, formed the basis of Nauru International Airport). To build it, they brought in 1,500 Japanese and Korean workers, besides using the Nauruans, Gilbertese, and Chinese as forced labour. The creation of the airstrip on the narrow coastal belt led to the expulsion of many natives from the districts of Boe and Yaren, where the best lands of the island were located. The airfield became operational in January 1943. Work on airstrips in Meneng and Anabar was begun but never completed.

One of the goals of the Japanese in invading Nauru had been the takeover of the island's strategic phosphate industry. A few days after their landing on 29 August 1942, the occupiers brought in 72 employees of the Nanyo Kohatsu Kabushiki Kaisha (South Sea Development Company) to assess the condition of the mining facilities sabotaged by the Australians before their departure. They recovered some machinery parts and ordered some Chinese to start collecting phosphate; however, in June 1943 the employees left, after some friction with the military. No shipments of phosphate appear to have been loaded during the Japanese occupation.

Because of the distance between Kwajalein and Nauru (more than 600 nm), on 15 February 1943, the Gilbert Islands, Ocean Island and Nauru were removed from the 6th Base Force in Kwajalein and replaced under a new 3rd Special Base Force with headquarters in Betio, with Admiral Saichirō Tomonari (友成佐市郎) replacing Keisuke Matsuo. Because of the loss of his command, Matsuo committed seppuku on 2 May 1943. Nauru was therefore used only as a link in the chain of Japanese defences in the Central Pacific Ocean.

=== 1943–1944: American offensive, murders, deportations, and isolation ===
==== American offensive ====
By the time the Japanese occupied Nauru in the summer of 1942, their offensive in the Pacific was coming to an end; checked at the Battle of the Coral Sea and defeated at Milne Bay and Midway, the Japanese were being forced onto the defensive. In 1943, as American offensives loomed in the relatively close Gilbert and Marshall Islands, the garrison on Nauru continued to improve its defences, unaware that the American Joint Chiefs of Staff, at a meeting in August, had decided to bypass the island. Wrote historian Samuel Eliot Morison, "it seemed unwise to leave an island with an airfield only 380 miles from Tarawa in enemy hands. But, the more Nauru was studied, the less anyone liked the idea of assaulting it. For Nauru is a solid island with no harbour or lagoon, shaped like a hat with a narrow brim of coastal plain where the enemy had built his airfield, and a crown where he had mounted coast defence artillery. The hilly interior was full of holes and caves where phosphate rock had been excavated – just the sort of terrain that the Japanese liked for defensive operations."

Although spared a pitched battle, Nauru would be subject to regular aerial bombardment, while Allied warships made it increasingly difficult for supply ships to get through to the island.

Beginning in mid-November 1943, US forces, in support of their campaign in the Gilberts, pounded Nauru for six weeks, effectively destroying the airfield. From December 1943 through January 1945, smaller-scale air raids continued on an almost daily basis.

==== Murder of the Australians ====
On 25 March 1943, 15 bombers from the US Army Air Force (USAAF) bombed the airstrip, destroying eight bombers and seven fighter planes. The five Australians interned on the island were killed by the Japanese shortly after this first American bombing raid.

After the war, at an Australian Military Court trial held in Rabaul in May 1946, Lieutenant Hiromi Nakayama was sentenced to death for the crime of killing the five Australians on Nauru, and was hanged on 10 August.

==== Population movements ====
Nauru population flows in June 1943: more than 2,000 Japanese and Korean soldiers and workers arrive on the island (red arrow), as do 600 Ocean Island natives. (blue arrow). In the same period, 1,200 Nauruans are deported to Truk Islands (green arrow).

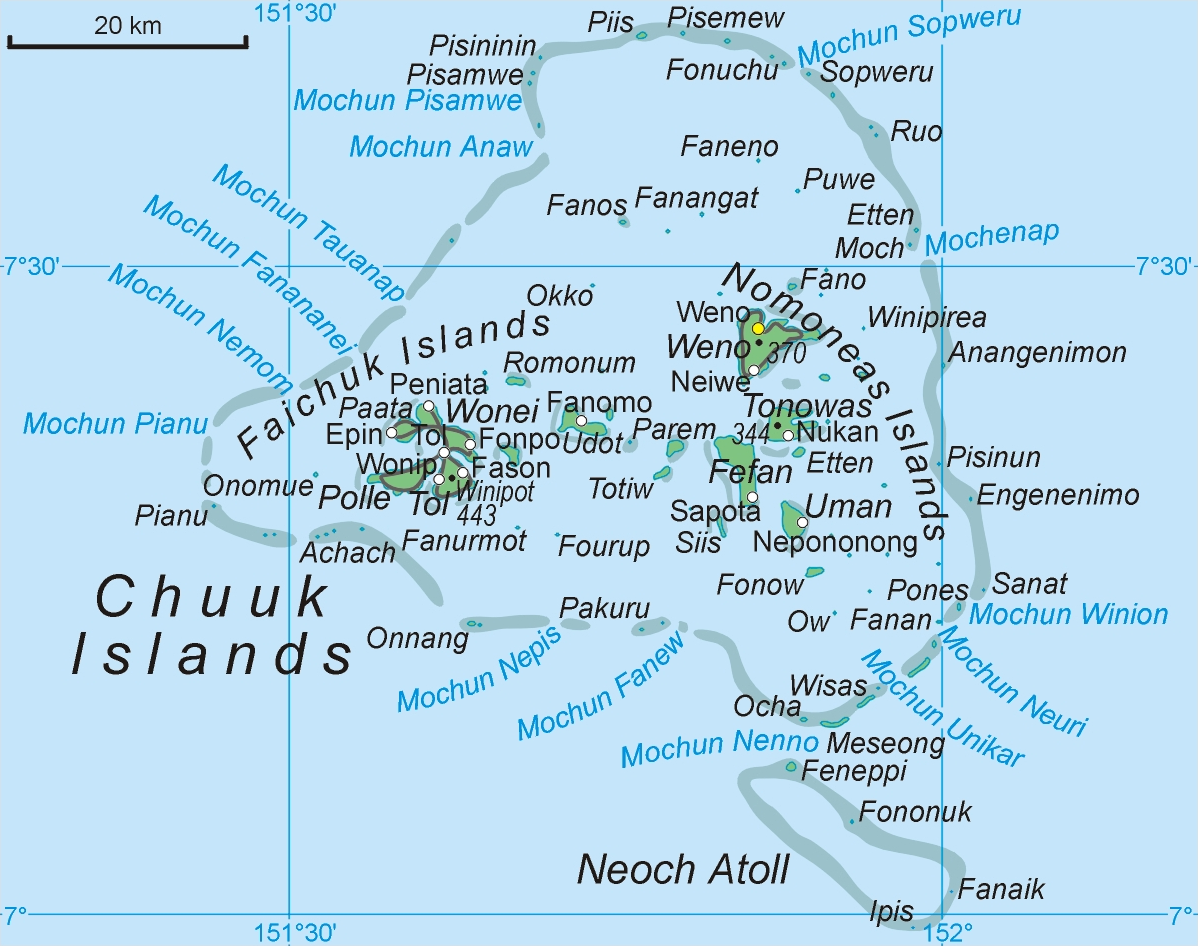
Truk, destination of Nauruan deportees

On Nauru the Japanese established a huge garrison relative to the size of the island. In June 1943 there were 5,187 inhabitants, 2,000 more than in 1940. This figure includes 1,388 military personnel and 1,500 Korean and Japanese workers, as well as 400 Gilbertese Islanders and Chinese previously brought in by the BPC. The 1,848 Nauruans were therefore a minority on their own island. At the end of June, 1,000 more military personnel were brought to Nauru.

The authorities, fearful of starvation on an overpopulated island kept under blockade, resolved to deport the entire Nauruan population. Shortly after the arrival of the last military convoy, the Japanese called together a Nauruan council and made the announcement of the deportation of some of the islanders under the leadership of Timothy Detudamo. They refused to tell the Nauruans their destination, which increased anxiety among the population; they were only told that the island to which they would be sent had an abundance of food. Just before departure, Nakayama, second in the military hierarchy of the island, gave Detudamo a letter bearing the seal of the emperor Hirohito, indicating that the Nauruans were under his protection. This document was later used for safe-conduct by the exiles.

On 29 June 1943, 600 Nauruans and seven Chinese were brought to the waterfront and taken aboard (by night, to avoid Allied attacks) the freighter Akibasan Maru. The following day the boat set sail, escorted by a small navy ship, for the Truk Islands, site of the headquarters of Japanese forces in the Central Pacific, 1,600 km north-west of Nauru in the Caroline Islands.

Following this departure, the Japanese committed what is considered their worst war crime on Nauru: the massacre of 39 lepers, who lived in a colony built by the Australians in Meneng. Before the arrival of the Japanese, the lepers had been able to receive visits from their families, and in certain instances, have their children live with them. The occupiers, fearful of contagion, isolated them completely as soon as they landed, and included their families in the first boat to Truk. On 11 July 1943, the 39 lepers – having been told they were to be transferred to a colony on Ponape – were placed aboard a fishing boat, which was then towed out to sea by the Japanese picket-boat Shinshu Maru. Once the boats were out of sight of Nauru the towrope was cut and sailors aboard the Shinshu Maru began firing on the fishing boat with the ship's 50 mm cannon and 7.7 mm machine gun. The Nauruans were finished off with rifle fire, and the boat capsized and sank. Lt. Nakayama, the de facto commander who had ordered the massacre, would later tell the new garrison commander, Captain Soeda, that the lepers and their boat had been lost in a typhoon while being taken to Jaluit atoll.

The following month, 659 emaciated Banabans were brought to Nauru from neighboring Ocean Island, which was also under Japanese occupation. They told the Nauruans about the drought in their land, which had become barren because of the Japanese presence, forcing them to eat grass and tree bark for survival.

A new contingent of 1,200 soldiers arrived 6 August 1943, and the same day, another group of 601 Nauruans, mainly women and children led by the two Catholic priests, Alois Kayser and Pierre Clivaz, were sent into exile. There had not yet been any news of the whereabouts of the first group. Although cramped, conditions aboard the boats bringing the Nauruans to the Truk islands were bearable. For the vast majority of the exiles, it was the first time they had left their isolated island; therefore, along with the general anxiety, there was some excitement, particularly among Nauruan youth.

On 11 September, the boat which was to be used to deport the remaining Nauruans arrived off the coast of the island, only to be destroyed by a torpedo from an American submarine. This prevented the Japanese from completing their plan of removing the entire Nauruan population and allowing only uprooted people without specific land rights to remain on the island.

In 1943, 1,200 Naruans left, but were replaced by a larger number of Japanese and Banabans, thus doing nothing to alleviate food shortages.

==== Survival in isolation ====
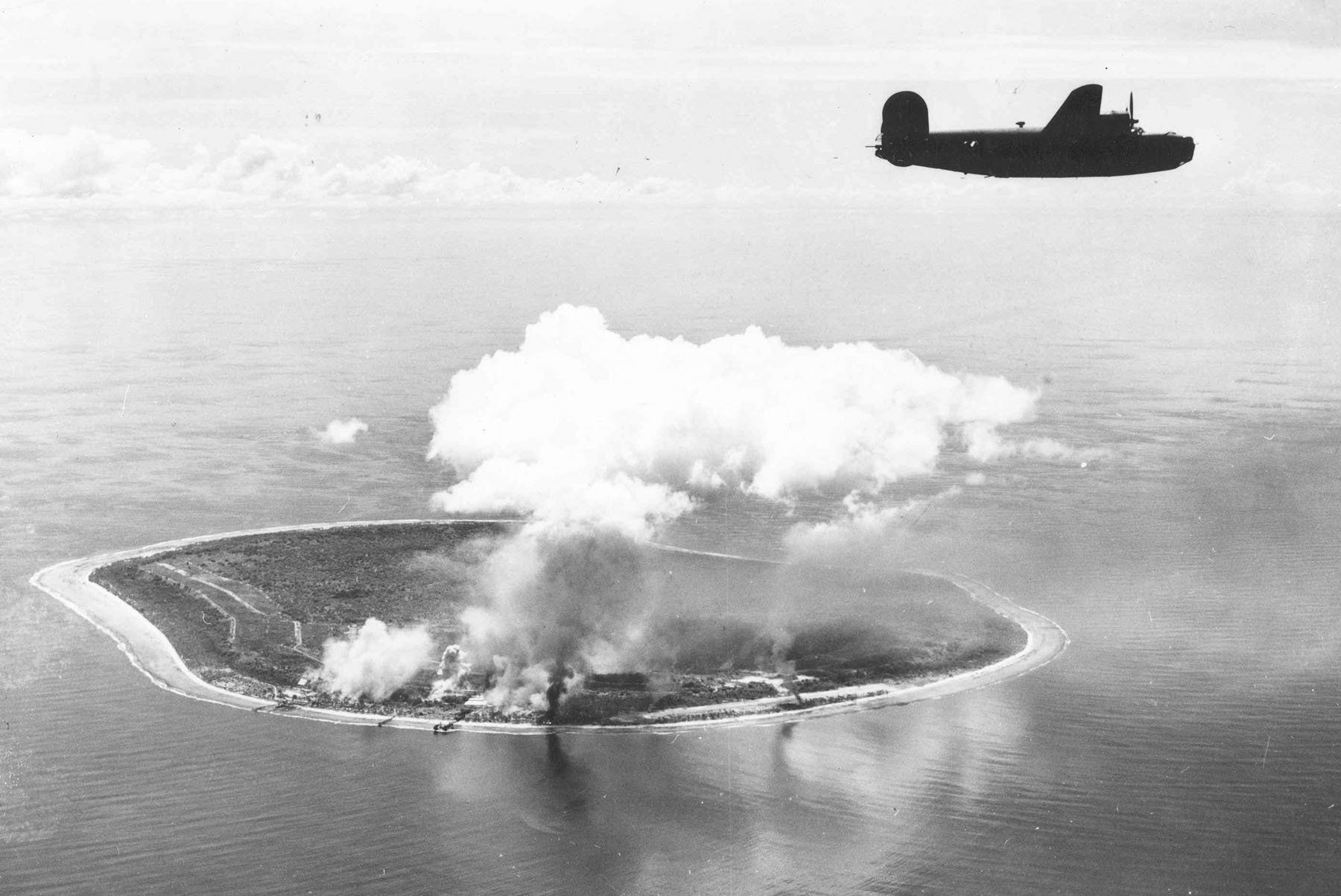
B-24s of the US Seventh Air Force bomb Nauru in April 1943

Occupied Nauru was at the very end of a long supply line linking the Pacific islands to Japan. The American advance toward the Western Pacific, and the growing effectiveness of American submarines, made supply missions to Nauru increasingly difficult. In September 1943, a 6,000 ton freighter loaded with supplies for the Japanese garrison was sunk off the island. In addition, the annual monsoon rains largely failed during the 1943–1944 season, resulting in a severe drought on the island. In early January 1944, only two Japanese supply ships made it to Nauru. The second boat arrived on 10 January, and was the last surface ship to resupply the base for the duration of the war. A final delivery of provisions and ammunition was made by two submarines in September 1944.

The situation forced the inhabitants to look for alternatives to imported goods. Their main concern was to compensate for the lack of food supplies, especially the rice that was the staple food under the Japanese occupation.

One of the Nauruans' methods to reach self-sufficiency was to exploit their gardens to the fullest. They cultivated many edible plants and were soon imitated by the Japanese, who began to farm every space available. They grew eggplant, corn, pumpkin, and sweet potato. Still lacking sufficient output, they created pumpkin plantations, using half drums filled with night soil which had been collected from the population by forced Chinese workers. This method turned out to be extremely productive in Nauru's tropical weather, but as a result, dysentery spread, killing several people. Swarms of flies appeared around the plantations, and the smell was unbearable. Toddy, brewed with the sap of coconut trees, was a valuable dietary supplement and at times the only food available. All the trees used for toddy were inventoried and allocated to the population, three for each Japanese, two for a Pacific Islander, and one for a Chinese. They were used to such an extent that they were no longer able to produce coconuts. After learning that rubber tree fruit was edible, the Japanese forbade the Islanders from gathering it, and started eating it themselves.

There was an upsurge of hunting, fishing, harvesting, and other traditional practices which had fallen into disuse during colonisation. Men would go up the cliffs hunting black noddy, a local small bird, while women were collecting sea food in the reefs; everyone was fishing as much as possible. Nauruan women produced twine, made of coconut tree fiber, which was used for construction in lieu of nails, as well as for canoe making and fishing. From pandanus leaves, they made a strong fabric used for mats, baskets, shelter-pieces, and sails.

=== 1945: Last year of war ===
By January 1945, the air raids on Nauru had tapered off, the front lines of the Pacific War having moved to the west. About 40 Nauruans had been killed in the attacks, and many more injured. The food shortage became acute. Several Chinese workers died of starvation, and islanders of all stripes suffered from various diseases, made worse by malnutrition, dwindling medical supplies, and the increasingly unsanitary conditions on the island. For the most part, however, the Nauruans on Nauru were faring better than their kinsmen who had been deported in 1943.

The Nauruan exiles had been relocated to Tarik, Tol, Fefan, and other islands in the Truk archipelago (modern Chuuk in the Federated States of Micronesia). As on Nauru, they had been forced to work for the Japanese, and had faced food shortages as Truk was in turn bombed and cut off by the Americans. Despite the best efforts of Timothy Detudamo, Father Kayser, Father Clivaz, and others, conditions were made worse in Truk by a complete lack of medical care and the Nauruans' status as aliens. The native Chuukese resented having to share scarce resources with the interlopers, while the Japanese treated them much more harshly than on Nauru. Many of the exiles suffered beatings, and many women were sexually assaulted. All were forced into long hours of heavy labor, mainly excavating defensive positions and growing food for the Japanese garrison.

Even after the Japanese surrender announcement on 15 August 1945, the Nauruan exiles had little choice but to continue working for the Japanese for several weeks, seemingly forgotten by the victorious Allies. While Detudamo wrote letters to Allied commanders pleading for help, Nauruans continued to die of malnutrition-related illnesses and simple starvation. In one six-month period in 1945, 200 Nauruans died on Tarik.

In January 1946, the deportees were finally repatriated to Nauru by the BPC ship Trienza. Of the 1,200 Nauruans who had left in 1943, fewer than 800 returned.

== Japanese surrender ==
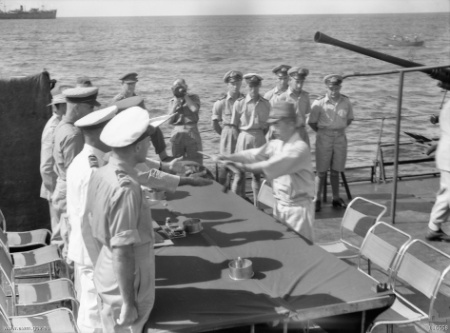
Japanese commander Hisayuki Soeda hands his sword to J. R. Stevenson, the Australian commander aboard HMAS Diamantina

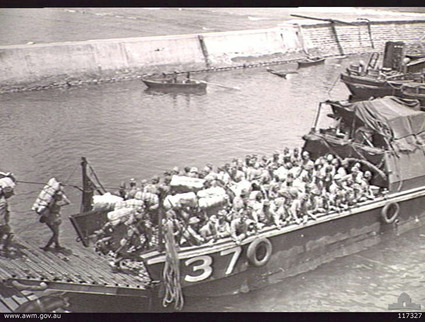
Japanese troops board a barge taking them out to a RAN vessel bound for Bougainville Island following their surrender

As the Pacific War finally reached its end, there was some uncertainty among the Allies as to whom Nauru and neighboring Ocean Island should be surrendered to. They were in a zone under American command, and it had been planned that US troops would liberate the islands; however, the Australians and New Zealanders emphasised the fact that both islands were critical to their economy, and that phosphate mining needed to be resumed as soon as possible. Thus it was agreed that the Royal Australian Navy would handle the task, with the Australian commander signing the surrender document twice, first as the representative of the United Kingdom, and then on behalf of the American Commander-in-Chief of the Pacific Fleet.

On 8 September, Australian planes dropped leaflets giving notice of the coming of three boats with personnel to oversee surrender proceedings. Five days later, on 13 September, the frigate HMAS Diamantina arrived offshore, escorted by the frigate HMAS Burdekin and the corvette HMAS Glenelg. On board were well-known figures of the colonial administration, including William Bot, the administrator of the local unit of the British Phosphate Commission, and Thomas Cude, head of the Nauruan police. Returning with them were five young Nauruans who had spent the war in Australia, where they had been studying at its outbreak. As the boat approached the islands, the passengers could plainly see the devastation wrought on the island. By means of signals, they arranged with the Japanese to conduct the surrender ceremony at 2 p.m. The Australian commander, Brigadier J. R. Stevenson, accompanied by P. Phipps of the Royal New Zealand Navy and representatives of the BPC, received the surrender of Hisayuki Soeda, commandant of Nauru's Japanese garrison. As a sign of submission, he handed his katana to Stevenson. The weapon was placed on the centre of the table and the instrument of surrender was then read in English and in Japanese. Soeda bowed in sign of agreement, signed the document, and rapidly left the boat, leaving his officers on board to be interrogated.

The following day, a contingent of 500 Australian soldiers landed. They were greeted by a jubilant crowd, while the Japanese were confined to their barracks. That afternoon, during a military ceremony, the Union Jack was hoisted over Nauru for the first time in three years. The executives of the BPC surveyed the island to determine the extent of war damage to mining infrastructure, and found the phosphate factory totally destroyed. However, they found that the health of the population was better than had been expected, based on the testimony of two Japanese who had fled the island in June 1945.

Between 1–3 October, the 3,745 Japanese and Koreans on the island were taken on board Allied ships heading for Bougainville Island in the Solomon Islands. During the transfer, the former occupiers were molested by the Nauruans in charge of the boarding operations. They were also violently attacked with canes by Chinese seeking revenge on their former tormentors. The abusers were harshly pushed back by the Australians.

Demography of Nauru at the surrender
Japanese soldiers	Japanese and Korean workers	Pacifics Islanders (Gilbertins, Banabans)	Chinese	Nauruans	total population
2681	1054	837	166	591	5329
Source : Tanaka 2010

== Aftermath ==
No climactic battle ever took place on Nauru, and the Japanese launched only a handful of minor raids from it. Nevertheless, the island played an important role in the campaigns of the Central Pacific. It was too well-defended to invade, yet its airfield and strategic location made it too threatening to ignore; thus the Americans had to divert considerable effort and resources to keep it neutralised. It could be said that militarily, the Japanese on Nauru did their job very effectively. Over 300 of them died from malnutrition, disease, and enemy action.

The BPC moved quickly. With much of the European staff returned, new facilities built, and new workers brought in, production was resumed in July 1946. Sanitary conditions on the island were quickly restored.

For the Nauruans, the occupation had a profound effect on their society and psychology. Unprotected by the Australians, bombed by the Americans, tormented by the Japanese, and shunned by the Chuukese, the seeds of self-determination were planted. Wrote historian Nancy J. Pollock:

First, determined to control their own lives after having been pawns in a major war, they rejected the British Phosphate Commission's offer to relocate them. Nauruans wanted to maintain ties to their island. After the war the fight for phosphate royalties continued with renewed vigor, ending only when the Nauruans bought the phosphate industry from the commission for A$20 million, a transaction entwined intimately with Nauru's declaration of independence in 1968. Second, their land became even more precious to them. Most Nauruans continue to live on Nauru. Those who do migrate do so either to seek education, to take positions in Nauruan diplomatic missions, or, in a few cases, to take jobs in Australia. But the bulk of the Nauruan population can be found living on the island of Nauru. In this they differ markedly from other Pacific Island nations where a growing proportion of the population is to be found in metropolitan countries.

== See also ==
- Japanese occupation of the Gilbert Islands
