= 1951 Nauruan Local Government Council election =

Elections for the Local Government Council were held for the first time in Nauru on 15 December 1951.

== Background ==
Since 1928 Nauru had had a Council of Chiefs whose members were elected for life terms. The Council of Chiefs did not have any powers and served only to advise the Administrator, who did not have to heed their advice. The Council sent a petition to the 1948–49 session of the United Nations Trusteeship Council, complaining that "the Native inhabitants still had no voice in the formulation of general administration policies or in the control of the finances in the island." However, the Australian Acting Minister for External Territories Cyril Chambers persuaded the Council to withdraw the petition.

In April 1950 the United Nations Visiting Mission visited Nauru for the first time, and recommended to the Trusteeship Council that the Council of Chiefs should be given more powers, including over legislation and the budget. This was accepted by the Australian administration, who passed the Nauru Local Government Council Ordinance on 20 August 1951, which formed a new Local Government Council with certain powers. The new Council was to be elected for four-year terms.

== Electoral system ==
The fourteen districts of Nauru were grouped into eight constituencies. Seven constituencies elected one member, whilst one (Denigomodu, Nibok, Uaboe and Baiti) elected two. The elections were held under universal suffrage and any eligible voter could stand as a candidate. Voting was compulsory.

A total of 21 candidates contested the elections.

== Results ==
A total of 655 votes were cast in the elections, of which 23 were invalid. One member, Appi Deigorongo, was elected unopposed in Boe.

Constituency	Elected members
Aiwo	Raymond Gadabu
Anabar	Adeang Deireragea
Anetan	Roy Degoregore
Boe	Appi Deigorongo
Buada	Totouwa Depaune
Meneng	James Ategan Bop
Ubenide	Austin Bernicke
Ubenide	Timothy Detudamo
Yaren	Julius Akubor
Source: Viviani

== Aftermath ==
The newly elected Council met for the first time on 18 December 1951 and elected Timothy Detudamo as Head Chief.
