= Nauru Local Government Council =

Nauruan legislative body

The Nauru Local Government Council was a legislative body in Nauru. It was first established in 1951, when Nauru was a United Nations trust territory, as a successor to the Council of Chiefs. It continued to exist until 1992, when it was dissolved in favor of the Nauru Island Council.

== History ==
Since 1928, the Nauruan people had been represented by an elected Council of Chiefs, which only had the power to advise the Administrator. By the late 1940s, there were calls for greater Nauruan self-government, both internationally by members of the United Nations Trusteeship Council, and internally by Nauruans themselves. Australia, which administered Nauru, was against this. The Council of Chiefs submitted a petition for more self-government for Nauru to the 1948-49 session of the Trusteeship Council, however Australian Acting External Affairs Minister Cyril Chambers convinced the Council of Chiefs to withdraw the petition. In 1950, the United Nations Visiting Mission recommended to the Trusteeship Council that the Council of Chiefs should have more legislative power, especially in the realm of budget appropriations.

On 20 August 1951, the recommendation was accepted in part, and the Nauru Local Government Council Ordinance was passed, creating the Local Government Council and imbuing it with certain powers. In effect, the Local Government Council did not have much more power than the previous Council of Chiefs, and the Administrator still had control over Nauru. The legislative body divided the 14 historical districts into eight electorates. Each electoral district had one councillor to represent it, except for the electoral district representing Denigomodu, Nibok, Uaboe, and Baiti, which had two. Councillors served four-year terms.

The first elections for the Local Government Council were held on 15 December 1951. It was the first election held with universal suffrage on the island. The first meeting of the council was held on 18 December. Timothy Detudamo, who had previously served as Head Chief in the Council of Chiefs, was elected Head Chief of Nauru by the Local Government Council. He died in 1953, being replaced by Raymond Gadabu. In 1954, the council gained more power, and the entire Nauru Royalties Fund were appropriated to the expenses of the council. After another council election in 1955, Hammer DeRoburt was elected Head Chief.

In 1966, the Trusteeship Council passed a resolution calling for Nauruan independence by 31 January 1968. At the same time, the Legislative Council was formed. Of the first members of the Legislative Council, most had been members of the Local Government Council. The Local Government Council had broad range of administrative activities, operating numerous government corporations and services. The bulk of its activities were funded by the Nauru Royalty Fund and the Nauru Development Fund.

In 1992, the Local Government Council was abolished. The Nauru Local Government Council Dissolution Act was certified on 2 March. The Local Government Council was dissolved to prevent the accumulation of more debt, which the institution had been accruing both internationally and domestically. The Nauru Island Council was created by parliamentary act certified on 20 March. Between the Local Government Council's dissolution and the Nauru Island Council's creation, there was an interim Nauru Council, which consisted of the cabinet of Nauru and was led by the president. The Nauru Island Council had less power than the Local Government Council, playing more of an advisory role to the national government. In 1999, the Nauru Island Council was dissolved, with its local government powers being subsumed by the national government.

== See also ==
- Parliament of Nauru
