= Head Chief of Nauru =

Position in Nauruan Government

The Head Chief of Nauru was a position held by at least 6 people between c. 1875–1942 and again between 1946–1968. At one time, the position was hereditary, but by 1921, chiefs were elected to the Council of Chiefs by the adult population of Nauru, and the head chief, along with a deputy head chief, was elected by the council from among its members.

After 1951, when the Council of Chiefs was replaced by the Nauru Local Government Council, the head chief was chosen by the Nauru Local Government Council from among its members.

== List of chiefs ==
Name	Tenure	Tribe	Notes
Chief Jim	???		Father of Aweida
Aweida	c. 1875–1921		Head Chief during the Nauruan Civil War.
Daimon	1921–1930	Unknown	1st Head Chief to be elected.
Timothy Detudamo	1930–1942, 1946–1953	Unknown	Translated the Bible into Nauruan. First Head Chief elected by the Nauru Local Government Council.
Raymond Gadabu	1953–1955	Iruwa	
Hammer DeRoburt	1955–1968	Iruwa	Last Head Chief.
