= Daimon (Head Chief) =

Nauruan head chief

Head Chief of Nauru
- In office 1921 – 21 October 1930
- Preceded by: Aweida
- Succeeded by: Timothy Detudamo

Personal details
- Born: c. 1850
- Died: 21 October 1930

Daimon (c. 1850 – 21 October 1930) was Head Chief of Nauru from 1920 until 1930. His 42 years as a chief was a record length of service.

== Biography ==
Daimon was born around 1850, the only son of Audoa and Edaganuwe. He was married three times and had eight children with his first wife, Eibiaun. His eldest son Deireragea went on to become Chief of Anibare District.

An unusually tall man at 6'4", he was involved in Civil War between the north and south of the island, leading the northern fighters. Daimon became a Chief in the late 1880s, and when Germany occupied the islands, he acted as an intermediary due to understanding of English.

When Head Chief Aweida died in 1921, Daimon was chosen as his successor. He remained in post until his death on 21 October 1930 aged 80, after which he was succeeded by Timothy Detudamo. His grandson Hammer DeRoburt became the first president of independent Nauru in 1968.
