= Rupert Clare Garsia =

Administrator of Nauru
- In office 1933–1938
- Preceded by: Daniel Eberhardt
- Succeeded by: Frederick Royden Chalmers

Personal details
- Born: 9 October 1887 Christchurch, New Zealand
- Died: 18 February 1954 (aged 66) Canberra, Australia

Commander Rupert Clare Garsia (9 October 1887 – 18 February 1954) was a New Zealand-born Royal Navy and Royal Australian Navy officer, and later Administrator of Nauru.

== Biography ==
Garsia was born in Christchurch in 1887 to Captain Christopher Garsia of the 79th Cameron Highlanders and Elizabeth Parker (née Watson). He attended Christchurch High School, before moving to England to complete his education on the Royal Navy training ship HMS Britannia. He subsequently joined HMS Russell as a midshipman in 1904, before becoming a sub-lieutenant in 1907 and then a lieutenant in 1910. He later served on HMS Psyche in Australia. He then returned to England to join the new battlecruiser HMS New Zealand and served on the ship on its 1913 world tour. He resigned from the Royal Navy in April 1914 and rejoined his family, who had relocated to Tasmania.

After the start of World War I, Garsia joined the Royal Australian Navy, becoming a lieutenant on HMAS Australia. He briefly served as prizemaster on the Zambesi in 1914, before rejoining HMAS Australia for the remainder of the war. The ship transported Australian troops to the Middle East, with Garsia overseeing a group of guns in a November 1914 skirmish that ended with the disabling of the German ship SMS Emden near Cocos Island. The ship moved to the North Sea in June 1916 and Garsia became a lieutenant-commander in April 1918.

After returning to Sydney in 1919, Garsia served on the boys' training ship HMAS Tingira until April 1921, when he commanded HMS Penguin, a depot ship. He was promoted to commander later in the year, after which he served on HMAS Brisbane, HMAS Melbourne and HMAS Marguerite. Between 1924 and 1925 he studied training and education in England, before returning to take over HMAS Tinigara. However, in April 1927, the ship was closed down. He subsequently commanded the depot ships HMAS Platypus and HMAS Penguin, before transferring to HMAS Brisbane in 1929 and back to HMAS Penguin in 1930.

In 1932 Garsia was appointed Administrator of Nauru. On January 17th, 1933, he succeeded Daniel Eberhardt who was the acting administrator of the Island at the time. He married Dorothea Lloyd in 1934. He resigned from the Administrator post in 1938 after the Australian government refused to consider plans he had drawn up to evacuate women and children from the island. he returned to Australia and settled in Canberra. The following year he was appointed Acting Captain and became Commodore of Convoys, a post he held until 1943. He subsequently commanded the HMAS Leeuwin depot until retiring in September 1945.

Garsia died in Canberra in February 1954 of a brain hemorrhage.
