= Robert Eyssen =

- Born: 2 April 1892
- Died: 31 March 1960 (aged 67)
- Military career
- Allegiance: Nazi Germany
- Branch: Kriegsmarine
- Rank: Konteradmiral
- Commands: Auxiliary cruiser Komet
- Conflicts: World War II
- Awards: Knight's Cross of the Iron Cross

Robert Eyssen (2 April 1892 – 31 March 1960) was a German admiral during World War II and recipient of the Knight's Cross of the Iron Cross of Nazi Germany. He joined the Imperial German Navy in 1911. He was the commander of German auxiliary cruiser Komet during its first raiding cruise from 4 July 1940 to 30 November 1941.

== Awards ==
- Iron Cross (1914) 2nd Class (4 January 1914) & 1st Class (12 July 1920)
- Knight's Cross Second Class of the Order of the Zähringer Lion with Swords (19 September 1918)
- Clasp to the Iron Cross (1939) 2nd Class & 1st Class (25 December 1940)
- Knight's Cross of the Iron Cross on 29 November 1941 as Konteradmiral and commander of auxiliary cruiser "Komet" (HSK-7)
