= Frederick Royden Chalmers =

Australian Army officer (1881–1943)

Frederick Royden Chalmers CMG, DSO
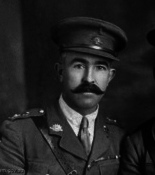
- Frederick Royden Chalmers c. 1922

Administrator of Nauru
- In office October 1938 – 26 August 1942
- Monarch: George VI
- Preceded by: Rupert Clare Garsia
- Succeeded by: Japanese occupation

Personal details
- Born: 4 January 1881 Brighton, Tasmania
- Died: 25 March 1943 (aged 62) Nauru

Military service
- Allegiance: Australia
- Branch/service: Australian Army
- Years of service: 1899–1902; 1914–1919
- Rank: Lieutenant Colonel
- Commands: 27th Battalion (1917–19)
- Battles/wars: Second Boer War; First World War
- Awards: Companion of the Order of St Michael and St George; Distinguished Service Order; Mentioned in Despatches (2)

Frederick Royden Chalmers, CMG, DSO (4 January 1881 – 25 March 1943) was an Australian farmer, soldier, businessman, and government administrator. His murder by Japanese soldiers on Nauru in 1943 was the focus of a war crimes trial following the Second World War.

== Early life and military service ==
Frederick Chalmers, son of Robert Hamilton Chalmers and Emily Louisa (Walter) Chalmers, was born in Brighton, Tasmania, on 4 January 1881, into a farming family. He had four brothers and four sisters.

At age 18 he enlisted in the army and served in South Africa during the Second Boer War, obtaining the rank of Lieutenant in 1901. After demobilization he returned to Tasmania, where he lived until 1907. He then joined the railway company of the State of Victoria, and worked as a salesman at Moe. Married to Mary Cecilia Bennett in 1910, he became a widower in 1914, and in April of the same year he re-enlisted in the Army. Joining the Australian Imperial Force as an enlisted man, he was promoted to lieutenant a month later. During the First World War he served in Egypt, Gallipoli, Belgium, and France. He was promoted to captain in August 1915. After officers' training at the military school of Aldershot in England late in 1916 he was promoted to major. He was given command of the 27th Battalion in October 1917, became a lieutenant colonel in January 1918, was awarded the Distinguished Service Order in November, and was named Companion of the Order of St Michael and St George in 1919.

Returning to Tasmania with his new wife, Lenna Annette French, whom he had married in London in 1917, he worked for several years in agriculture in Bagdad and in mining on the west coast of Tasmania. He headed an association of veterans and was involved in the Boy Scouts.

== Administrator of Nauru ==
In 1938, Chalmers was selected from among 70 candidates to succeed R.C. Garsia as head of the administration of Nauru, a Pacific island supervised by Australia under League of Nations mandate. It had over 3,500 inhabitants, and was of strategic importance to the Commonwealth owing to its very large deposits of phosphate (which was used in fertilizer, making it critical to Australia and New Zealand's agriculture-based economies). His affable manner made him a popular figure on Nauru. He introduced Berkshire pigs to the island to improve the local livestock, and also gambusia fish to combat the proliferation of mosquitoes.

On 27 December 1940, after the outbreak of the Second World War, an auxiliary cruiser of the Kriegsmarine, the Komet, appeared off Nauru's shore. After warning the residents via signals, the German commerce raider began shelling the island's mining facilities, fuel storage tanks, and cantilevered loading jetties, causing tremendous damage. An infuriated Chalmers reportedly stomped along the waterfront hurling insults at the enemy ship. A year later, the decision was made to evacuate the island with the outbreak of the Pacific War. All Westerners including civilians and military garrison were taken off in February 1942 along with half the foreign workers, however, 191 Chinese were left behind along with the native Nauruans. Chalmers (along with four other Australians, two of whom were missionaries) chose to remain feeling it was their duty to look after the islanders; despite being told they would be evacuated later, they were not due to the rapid pace of the Japanese advance during the South-East Asian campaigns of 1941–42.

== Death ==
When Japanese occupation forces invaded the islands in August 1942, Chalmers and the other Australians were interned in a house near the island's native hospital.

On 25 March 1943, after an American bombing raid on Nauru's Japanese-built airfield, the garrison's second-in-command, Lieutenant Hiromi Nakayama, ordered the execution of all five Australians. Chalmers and his companions were beheaded, bayoneted, or shot (later testimony varied) and buried on the beach. After the war Nakayama was found guilty of murder by an Australian war crimes tribunal at Rabaul. He was hanged in August 1946.

Chalmers' wife Lenna died while he was in captivity. They had four daughters. He also had a son Roy and two daughters, Molly and Emily Noreen, with his first wife Mary.

== Legacy ==
A monument to Chalmers, as well as the other victims of the war, was erected on Nauru in 1951.

== See also ==
- German attacks on Nauru
- Japanese occupation of Nauru
