= Raymond Gadabu =

Nauruan politician

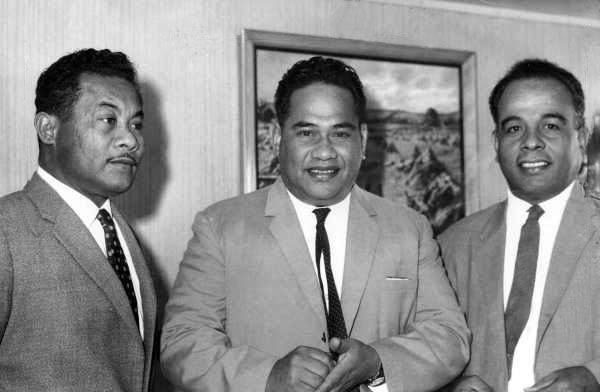
Raymond Gadabu (left) with Hammer DeRoburt (center)

Raymond Gadabu (25 September 1921 – 17 October 1964) was a Nauruan politician who served as Head Chief of Nauru from 1953 to 1955.

== Biography ==
Gadabu was a member of the Iruwa tribe. Gadabu attended Nauru Primary School before moving to Australia to study at Geelong Junior Technical College, the Gordon Institute and Everett's Business College in Melbourne. In 1941 he began work as a ledger clerk at Geelong and Crossy Trading, later becoming a shipping clerk and salesman for the company. He returned to Nauru in 1945 to join the civil service, becoming a welfare officer. The following year he became an accounts clerk, and in 1951 was appointed a clerk in the Nauruan Affairs department.

When democracy was introduced to Nauru in 1951, Gadabu was elected to the first Local Government Council from the Aiwo constituency. Following the death of Head Chief Timothy Detudamo in April 1953, Gadabu was elected as his replacement. In 1954 he was appointed a Nauruan Affairs officer and made a magistrate in the Nauru District Court. Although he was re-elected to the Council in 1955, he was replaced as Head Chief by Hammer DeRoburt.
