= Hiromi Nakayama =

Japanese officer, war criminal, died 1946

- 中山 博満
- Died: 10 August 1946; Rabaul
- Military career
- Allegiance: Empire of Japan
- Branch: Imperial Japanese Army
- Rank: Lieutenant
- Unit: 43rd Guard Force
- Conflicts: World War II; Operation RY

Lieutenant Hiromi Nakayama (中山 博満, Nakayama Hiromi; died 10 August 1946) was an Imperial Japanese Army soldier and convicted war criminal.

During the Pacific conflict of World War II, the Imperial Japanese Army undertook Operation RY on 26 August 1942, with a company (100 men) of the 43rd Guard Force (Palau), led by Lieutenant Nakayama, invading and occupying the island of Nauru. Nakayama executed Colonel F. R. Chalmers and four other prisoners of war in March 1943. Captured after the surrender of Japanese forces on Nauru on 13 September 1945, he was then transported to Rabaul, as a prisoner of war. Tried at an Australian Military Court trial held in Rabaul in May 1946, Nakayama was sentenced to death for the crime of killing the five Australians on Nauru, and was hanged on 10 August.
