= Council of Chiefs (Nauru) =

Nauruan political body

History
- Established: 1927
- Disbanded: 1951
- Succeeded by: Nauru Local Government Council

Structure
- Seats: 14
- Length of term: Elected for life

The Council of Chiefs was a Nauruan political body. It was formally established in 1927, and served as an advisory body to the Administrator. It was replaced in 1951 by the Nauru Local Government Council.

== History ==
The Council of Chiefs has its early origin after the Nauruan Civil War and subsequent German annexation in 1888. Nauru District Officer Fritz Jung maintained an informal Council of Chiefs as a way of consulting with the Nauruan people. During Nauru's time as a German protectorate, the traditional Nauruan tribal social structure was largely intact. This arrangement remained until their autonomy was abrogated by the Nauru Island Agreement in 1919, after Nauru had become a League of Nations mandate.

The Administrators over Nauru were pressured by Nauruans for greater autonomy. In 1925, the Administration established an advisory council with two appointed Europeans and two elected Nauruans. Nauruan voices were ultimately drowned out by the Europeans on this council. In 1927, the Council of Chiefs was reconstituted by the Administration and British Phosphate Commissioners. It consisted of fourteen elected chiefs, one for each district. Chiefs were elected for life, but could be removed by the council. The chiefs elected from among themselves a head chief and deputy head chief. The structure of the Council of Chiefs was not consistent with traditional Nauruan tribal structure nor district administration. A more traditional Nauruan tribal structure was maintained by Nauruans outside of this externally imposed political body. The Council of Chiefs acted as a mostly advisory council to the Administrator, without obligation by the Administrators to follow said advise, however it did control a trust fund financed by capitation taxes paid by Nauruans to the Administration. In 1932, the Council of Chiefs established a Domaneab, or meeting place, which was able to facilitate a social area for only the Nauruan people.

The Council of Chiefs was reconstituted after World War II. By the late 1940s, there were calls for greater Nauruan self-government, both internationally by members of the United Nations Trusteeship Council, and internally by Nauruans themselves. The Council of Chiefs submitted a petition for more self-government for Nauru to the 1948-49 session of the Trusteeship Council, however Australian Acting External Affairs Minister Cyril Chambers convinced the Council of Chiefs to withdraw the petition. In 1950, the United Nations Visiting Mission recommended to the Trusteeship Council that the Council of Chiefs should have more legislative power, especially in the realm of budget appropriations. On 20 August 1951, the recommendation was accepted in part, and the Nauru Local Government Council Ordinance was passed, with this new council replacing the Council of Chiefs.
