= Bezirksamtmann =

German administrative title

Bezirksamtmann (plural Bezirksamtleute) is a German administrative title of gubernatorial or lower rank, roughly translating as equivalent to the British District Officer. It is derived from Bezirk ("district") + Amtmann ("official").

== Colonial use ==
The title was used for colonial officials in the following minor German Schutzgebiete (i.e. colonial possessions of various status) in the Pacific: (probably incomplete list)

- Jaluit (Marshall Islands), subordinate of the colonial governor of German New Guinea
  - 1906 - 30 April 1907 Victor Berg (b. 1861 - d. 1907)
  - 1907 Joseph Siegwantz (acting)
  - 1908 - November 1909 Wilhelm Stuckhardt (d. 1909)
  - November 1909 - 1910 Berghausen (interim)
  - 1910 - 1911 Georg Merz; he stayed on as only Stationsleiter ('Station chief') (1911 - 3 October 1914), subordinate to the Eastern Caroline islands district, see below
- Nauru, until 1888 a tribal protectorate, till 1889 under a Reichskommissar
  - 2 October 1888 - May 1889 Robert Rasch (acting)
  - May 1889 - 1895 Christian Johannson
  - 1895 - 1898 Fritz Jung
  - 1899 - 1906 Ludwig Kaiser (b. 1862 - d. 1906); afterwards the jurisdiction was downgraded and administered by Station Chiefs (Stationsleiter), from 1911 subordinated to the administrators of Ponape district (in the Eastern Carolinas, cfr. infra)
- Marianen Inseln (German for 'Marianas Islands', i.e. the Northern Marianas, sold by Spain), as subordinate of the colonial governor of German New Guinea :
  - November 1899 - April 1907 Georg Fritz (on Saipan)
  - 1904 - 1907 Volker Reichel (on Rota island); afterwards administered by a Stationsleiter ('Station chief') who was subordinated to a district officer in Micronesia and thus to his superiors
- in Micronesia, which was 18 July 1899 - 7 October 1914 under the authority of the governors of German New Guinea (and their Vice-governors of German New Guinea, which had the general supervision over the island districts), there were two island districts, under District officers which from 1889 were styled Bezirksamtmann:
  - Western Caroline Islands (Yap and Palau [and from 1907 Saipan)
    - 29 June 1886 - 18.. Manuel de Elisa
    - .... - .... ....
    - before November 1897 - after November 1898 S. Cortes
    - 1899 - 1909 Arno Senfft (b. 1864 - d. 1909)
    - 1909 Rudolf Karlowa
    - 1909 - 1910 Georg Fritz
    - 1910 - 1911 Hermann Kersting
    - 1911 - 1914 Baumert
  - Eastern Caroline islands (Ponape [and from 1911 the Marshall Islands, cfr. supra])
    - June 1886 - 1887 Capriles
    - 14 March 1887 - 1887 Isidro Posadillo (d. 1887)
    - October 1887 - January 1891 Luis Cadarso y Rey (d. 1898)
    - c.1894 Concha
    - before November 1897 - after November 1898 J. Fernandez de Cordoba
    - 12 October 1899 - August? 1901 Albert Hahl (b. 1868 - d. 1945)
    - 1 September 1901 - 30 April 1907 Victor Berg (b. 1861 - d. 1907)
    - 1907 - 1908? Girschner (acting)
    - 1908 - 1909 Georg Fritz
    - 1909 - 18 October 1910 Gustav Boeder (d. 1910)
    - 1910 - 7 October 1914 August Überhorst ...

== German speaking countries ==
=== Germany ===
The Bezirksamtmann used to be the head officer of the Bezirksamt (district) in Bavaria and the Palatinate between 1862 and 1920.

=== Switzerland ===
Several cantons in Switzerland have a Bezirksamtmann or Bezirksammann as head officer of the Bezirksamt (district).

== Sources and references ==
- WorldStatesmen- links to each nation
