= Timothy Detudamo =

Nauruan politician

Head Chief of Nauru
- In office 1930–1942, 1946–1953
- Preceded by: Daimon
- Succeeded by: Raymond Gadabu

Personal details
- Born: 25 March 1888 Uaboe district, Nauru
- Died: 11 April 1953 (aged 65) Sydney, Australia

Timothy Detudamo (25 March 1888 – 11 April 1953) was a Nauruan politician and linguist. He served as Head Chief of Nauru from 1930 until his death in 1953.

== Biography ==
Detudamo was born in 1888 in Uaboe District.

Detudamo was among the first Nauruan converts to Protestant Christianity following the arrival of German missionary Philip Delaporte in 1899. He assisted Delaporte in the alphabetisation of the Nauruan language and the first publications in Nauruan, including school primers and religious instructional texts. He and Jacob Aroi also worked with Delaporte to completion a Nauruan translation of the New Testament, published in 1907.

In 1915, Detudamo accompanied Delaporte to the United States to continue their work on a full Nauruan translation of the Bible. He lived in the United States for three years, with his journey financed by Nauruan donations to the value of $500. In addition to Nauruan he spoke German, English, Gilbertese and Marshallese. After his return, Detudamo "became the spiritual and political leader of his people in their long struggle against colonialism".

In November 1930, Detudamo was appointed Head Chief of Nauru by Administrator William Augustin Newman following the death of Daimon. In 1936 he was appointed to the Language Committee which standardised Nauruan and introduced reforms to its orthography. He served as Head Chief until 1942 when Japan invaded and occupied the island. During the Japanese occupation, Detudamo served as Governor of Nauru until 30 June 1943 when he was deported along with most of the Nauruan population to Chuuk in Micronesia. On 31 January 1946 he returned to Nauru and was duly re-elected to the position of Head Chief. Following the introduction of a Nauru Local Government Council in 1951 Detudamo was elected as a councillor for the Districts of Denigomodu, Nibok, Uaboe, and Baitsi. He was also re-elected as Head Chief by the NLGC

Detudamo also helped establish the first Nauruan large enterprise, a Nauruan land owners co-operative general store. It was called the Nauru Cooperative Society and adopted the name 'Eigigu' in symbolically depicting the Nauruan "Lady on the Moon" legend.

Detudamo died in Sydney in Australia on 11 April 1953 at the age of 65, and was succeeded as Head Chief by Raymond Gadabu. His son Buraro later served as an MP and minister.

== Legacy ==
In 2026, Nauruan author Priscilla Eipon Grundler published an illustrated children’s book about Detudamo’s life and work; the first copy was presented as a gift to President David Adeang. Grundler and Adeang are both third- and fourth-generation descendants of Detudamo.
