= Ichabod Crane =

Fictional character from The Legend of Sleepy Hollow

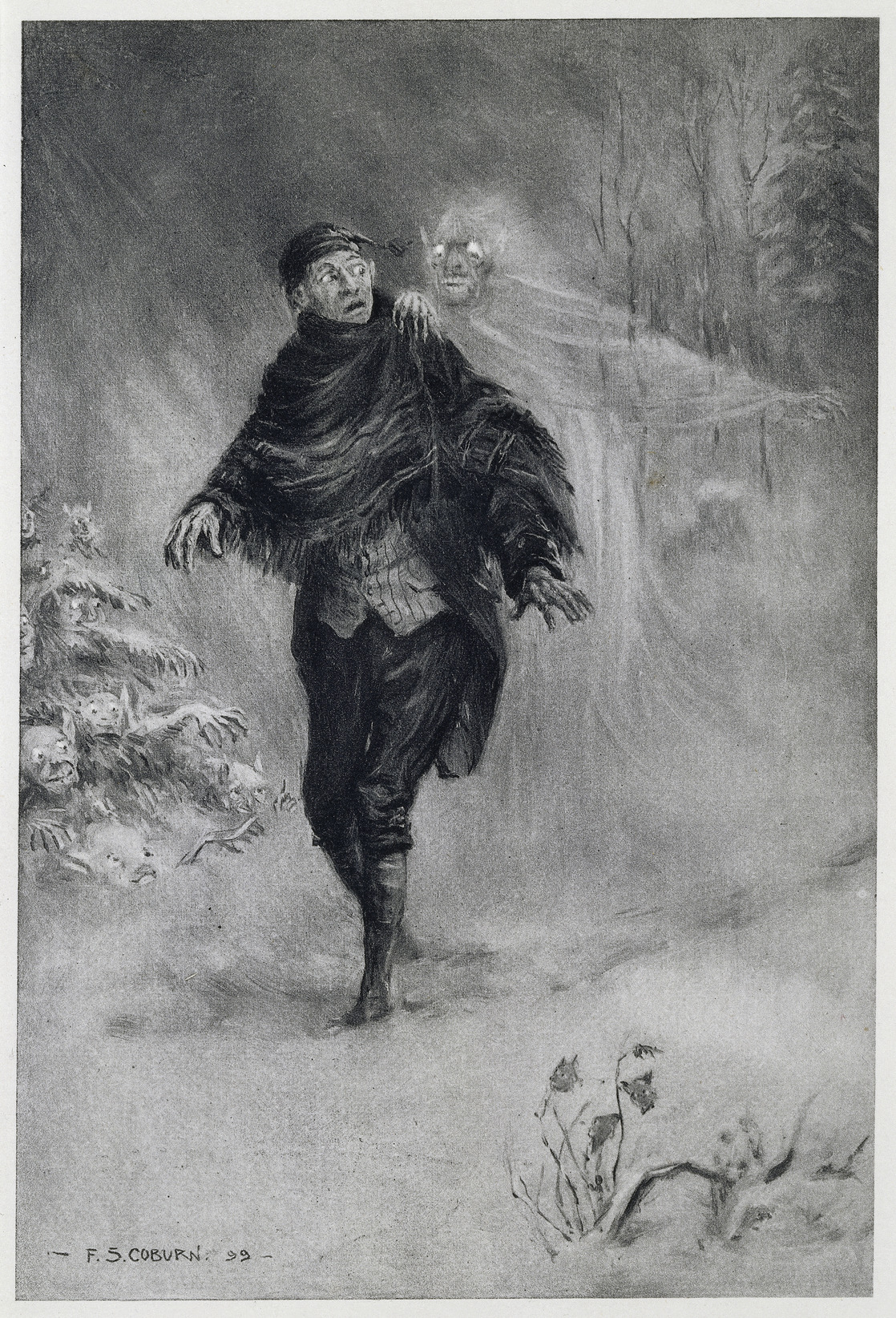
- "What fearful shapes and shadows beset his path amidst the dim and ghastly glare of a snowy night!" by Frederick Simpson Coburn (1899). Ichabod Crane walks home after an evening listening to ghost stories.
- First appearance: "The Legend of Sleepy Hollow"; 1820
- Created by: Washington Irving
- Portrayed by: Will Rogers, The Headless Horseman (1922); Jeff Goldblum, The Legend of Sleepy Hollow (1980); Johnny Depp, Sleepy Hollow (1999); Tom Mison, Sleepy Hollow (2013)
- Voiced by: Bing Crosby, The Adventures of Ichabod and Mr. Toad (1949); Pinto Colvig, The Adventures of Ichabod and Mr. Toad (1949) (screams only); William H. Macy, The Night of the Headless Horseman (1999)

In-universe information
- Occupation: Schoolmaster
- Home: Sleepy Hollow, New York

Ichabod Crane is a fictional character and the protagonist in Washington Irving's short story "The Legend of Sleepy Hollow". Crane is portrayed in the original work, and in most adaptations, as a tall, lanky individual. He is the local schoolmaster, and strongly believes in all things supernatural, including the legend of the Headless Horseman. Crane eventually tries unsuccessfully to court the heiress Katrina Van Tassel, a decision that angers Abraham "Brom Bones" Van Brunt, a local man who also wishes to marry Katrina. After supposedly proposing to Katrina, Crane is on his way home alone at night when the Headless Horseman appears and chases the schoolmaster. The Horseman eventually throws his pumpkin head at Crane, causing him to mysteriously disappear from Sleepy Hollow without a trace.

Jonathan Arac argues that "Crane immortalized one American type": that of the go-getting Yankee.

== Origin ==
Ichabod—meaning 'without glory' in Hebrew—comes from the biblical figure of that name. Irving might have borrowed the name from that of Ichabod Crane, a colonel in the US Army during the War of 1812, whom he had met in 1814 in Sackets Harbor, New York.

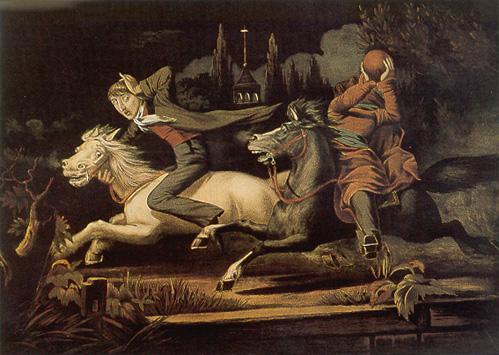
"Ichabod Crane, Respectfully Dedicated to Washington Irving" by William J. Wilgus; chromolithograph (c. 1856)

According to a notation by Irving and a certification written in longhand by Martin Van Buren, the 'pattern' (Van Buren's words) for the character of Ichabod Crane was based on the original Kinderhook schoolmaster named Jesse Merwin—born in Connecticut—whom Irving befriended in Kinderhook, New York, in 1809. The two friends continued a pen-pal correspondence for thirty years.

Kinderhook's original schoolhouse is now owned by the Columbia County Historical Society and called the Ichabod Crane Schoolhouse. The area's modern-day school district, Ichabod Crane Central School District, is also named for the character.

It is claimed by many that Irving's friend Samuel Youngs is the original from whom Irving drew his character of Ichabod Crane. Author Gary Deniss asserts that while the character of Ichabod Crane is loosely based on Merwin, it may include elements from Youngs' life.

== Characteristics ==
According to Irving, Ichabod's appearance is like that of a goofy, old scarecrow who escaped the cornfield. He is described by Irving in the story as "tall, but exceedingly lank, with narrow shoulders, long arms and legs, hands that dangled a mile out of his sleeves, feet that might have served for shovels, and his whole frame most loosely hung together. His head was small, and flat at the top, with huge ears, large green glassy eyes, and a long snipe nose, so that it looked like a cock perched upon his spindle neck, to tell which way the wind blew."

== Role in story ==
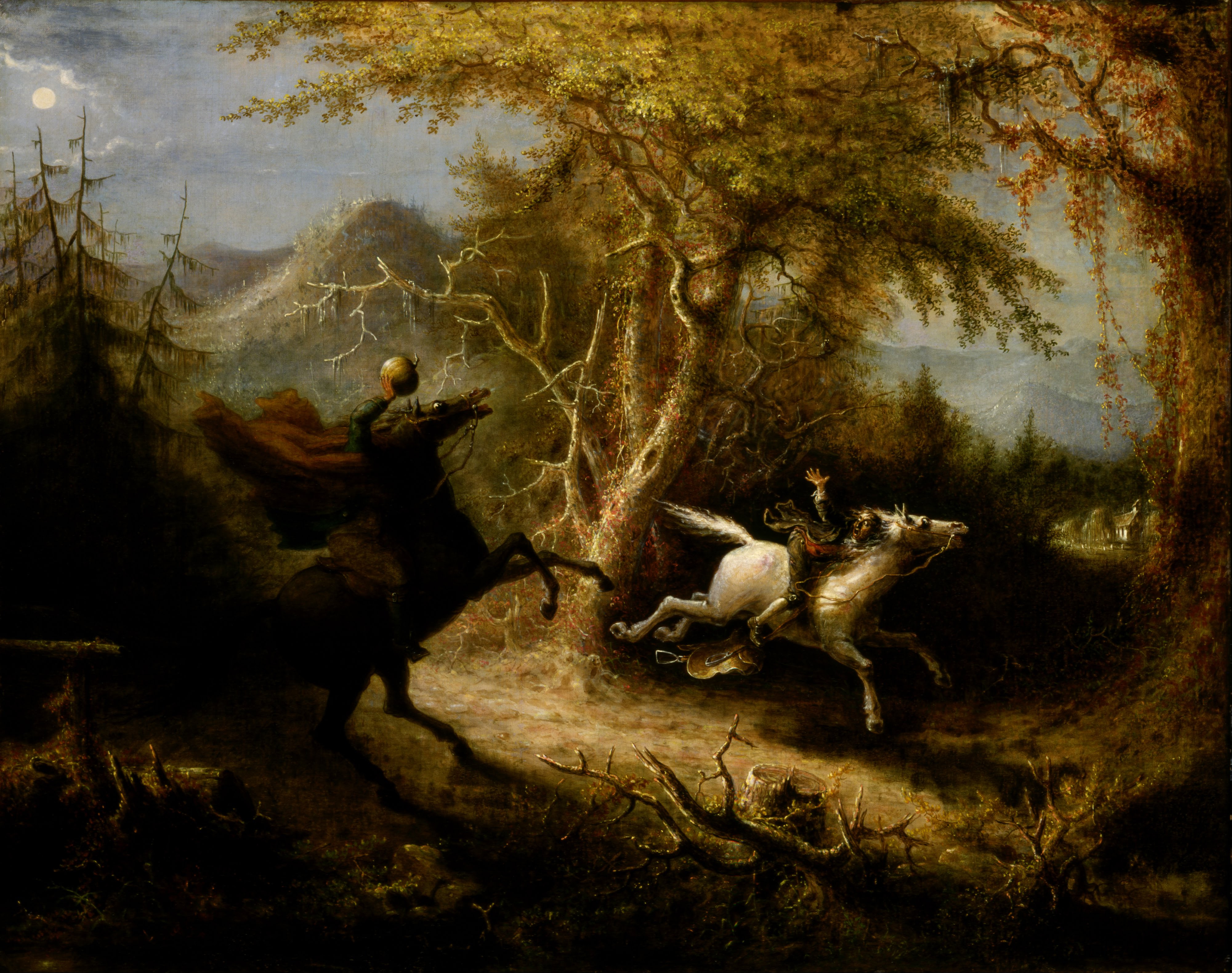
The Headless Horseman Pursuing Ichabod Crane, by John Quidor, 1858

=== Life and vocation ===
Ichabod Crane is a schoolmaster originally from Connecticut, with strong beliefs in the supernatural. He is described in his vocation as "a conscientious man and ever bore in mind the golden maxim, 'Spare the rod and spoil the child.' Ichabod Crane's scholars certainly were not spoiled." However, "he administered justice with discrimination rather than severity; taking the burden off the backs of the weak, and laying it on those of the strong."

He makes little money as a schoolmaster; his wages are "scarcely sufficient to furnish him with daily bread." However, he is able to sustain himself through the help of the community, who "according to country custom in those parts, boarded and lodged [him] at the houses of the farmers whose children he instructed. With these he lived successively a week at a time, thus going the rounds of the neighborhood, with all his worldly effects tied up in a cotton handkerchief." In order to stay on good terms with his patrons and in some degree to repay them for their patronage, he "assisted the farmers occasionally in the lighter labors of their farms, helped to make hay, mended the fences, took the horses to water, drove the cows from pasture, and cut wood for the winter fire" and also occasionally acts as the family babysitter.

In addition to his job as schoolmaster, Ichabod is also "the singing-master of the neighborhood", earning "many bright shillings" in the instruction of the community's young folk in psalmody, and often on Sundays would "take his station in front of the church gallery, with a band of chosen singers; where, in his own, he completely carried away the psalm from the person."

Caleb Stegall suggests that "the most distinctive characteristic Irving gives Ichabod is that of a psalm singer," and that Ichabod Crane is the "most celebrated Covenanter in all of the literature."

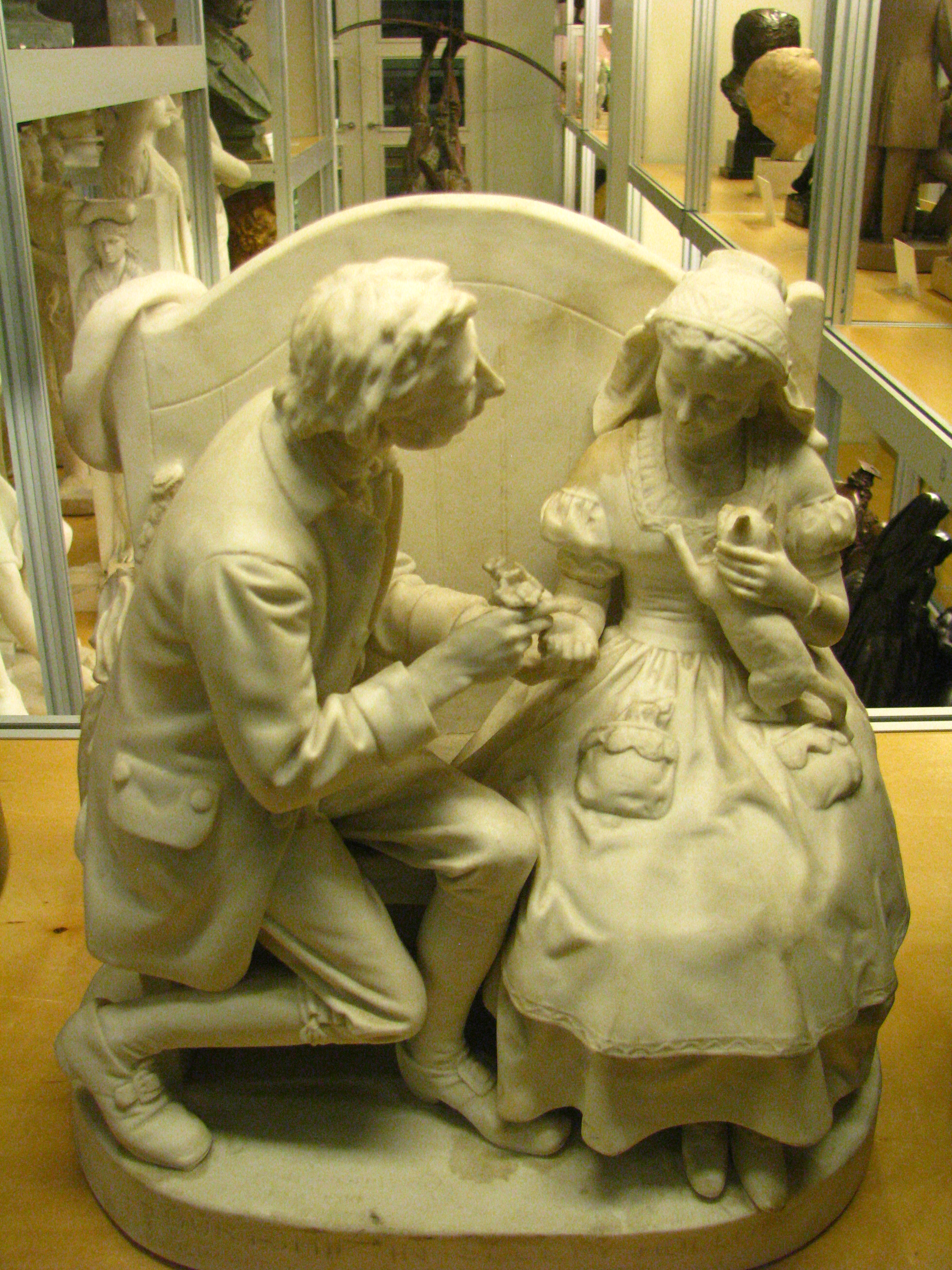
"Courtship In Sleepy Hollow, or Ichabod Crane and Katrina Van Tassel" (1868)

=== Supernatural beliefs and local renown ===
Ichabod is described as being well-read in the literature of the supernatural and superstition. In the story, "he was...esteemed by the women as a man of great erudition, for he had read several books quite through, and was regarded a master of Cotton Mather's History of New England Witchcraft, in which, by the way, he most firmly and potently believed." In addition, he "took pleasure in reading old Mather's direful tales till dusk after school. Moreover, no supernatural story or superstition was hard for him to believe." He would often share his beliefs and readings with others; indeed, in the story, "another of his sources of fearful pleasure was to pass long winter evenings with the old Dutch wives, as they sat spinning by the fire, with a row of apples roasting and spluttering along with the hearth, and listen to their marvelous tales of ghosts and goblins, and haunted fields, and haunted brooks, and haunted bridges, and haunted houses, and particularly of the Headless Horseman, or Galloping Hessian of the Hollow, as they sometimes called him", and he "would delight [listeners] equally by his anecdotes of witchcraft, and of the direful omens and portentous sights and sounds in the air, which prevailed in the earlier times of Connecticut; and would frighten them woefully with speculations upon comets and shooting stars, and with the fact that the world did absolutely turn round, and that they were half the time topsy-turvy!"

Irving describes Ichabod as being considered, because of the standing of the schoolmaster in rural communities, "a man of some importance in the female circle of a rural neighborhood; being considered a kind of idle, gentleman-like personage, of vastly superior taste and accomplishments to the rough country swains, and, indeed, inferior in learning only to the parson." The community's female circle embraces him especially as "a travelling gazette, carrying the whole budget of local gossip from house to house so that his appearance was always greeted with satisfaction", and because of his monopolizing the attention of the ladies on certain occasions the male population envy him his supposed "superior elegance and address."

=== Katrina Van Tassel ===
Ichabod is said to have a "soft and foolish heart towards the [opposite] sex." In the story, Irving writes regarding Ichabod: "he would have passed a pleasant life of it, despite the Devil and all his works, if his path had not been crossed by a being that causes more perplexity to mortal man than ghosts, goblins, and the whole race of witches put together, and that was—a woman."

A turning point in the story occurs when Ichabod becomes enamoured of one Katrina Van Tassel, the daughter and only child of a wealthy farmer named Baltus Van Tassel, who pays little attention to his daughter other than to be proud of her merits when they are praised. On account of her father's wealth (which Ichabod is eager to inherit), he begins to court Katrina, who seems to respond in kind. This attracts the attention of the rowdy town hero Abraham "Brom Bones" Van Brunt who also wants to marry Katrina and is challenged in this only by Ichabod. Despite Brom's efforts to humiliate or punish the schoolmaster, Ichabod remains steadfast and neither contestant seems able to gain any advantage throughout this rivalry.

Later, both men are invited to a harvest festival party at Van Tassel's where Ichabod's social skills far outshine Brom's. After the party breaks up, Ichabod remains behind for "a tête-à-tête with the heiress", where it is supposed that he makes a proposal of marriage to Katrina but, according to the narrator, "Something, however... must have gone wrong, for he certainly sallied forth, after no very great interval, with an air quite desolate and chapfallen", meaning that his proposal is refused, allegedly because her sole purpose in courting him was either to test or to increase Brom's desire for her. Therefore, Ichabod leaves the house "with the air of one who had been sacking a hen-roost, rather than a fair lady's heart."

=== Encounter with the Headless Horseman ===
During his journey home, Ichabod encounters another traveller, who is eventually revealed to be the legendary Headless Horseman; the ghost of a Hessian soldier who was decapitated by a cannonball during the American Revolutionary War. Ichabod flees with the Headless Horseman pursuing him, eventually crossing a bridge near the old Dutch churchyard. Because the ghost is supposedly incapable of crossing this bridge, Ichabod assumes that he is safe. However, the Headless Horseman throws his severed head at him, knocking Ichabod from the back of his own horse before he can react, sending him "tumbling headlong into the dust."

=== Dubious fates of Icabod ===
The next morning, Ichabod's hat is found abandoned near the church bridge, and close beside it is a shattered pumpkin. Ichabod is never seen again in Sleepy Hollow. There have been claims on what happened to Ichabod.

- The Dutch settlers presumed that Icabod had been spirited away by the Headless Horseman and his ghost is said to haunt the now abandoned schoolhouse that he used to work at.
- Information received from "an old farmer, who had been down to New York on a visit several years after, and from whom this account of the ghostly adventure was received" suggests that a still-living Ichabod had abruptly left the town forever by having been frightened away by both the Horseman and the anticipated anger of his current landlord, eventually becoming "a justice of the ten-pound court" in "a distant part of the country," and also "in mortification at having been suddenly dismissed by the heiress".

Regardless of the listed fates, Katrina is married to Brom, who is said to look "exceedingly knowing whenever the story of Ichabod was related, and always laughed heartily at the mention of the pumpkin." These events "led some to suspect that he knew more about the matter than he chose to tell." Therefore, it can be assumed that Brom himself was the Horseman, whose legend he took advantage of to rid himself of his rival.

== Adaptations in other media ==
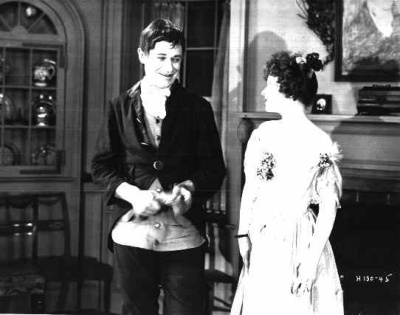
Will Rogers as Ichabod Crane and Lois Meredith as Katrina Van Tassel, in The Headless Horseman (1922)

- Will Rogers portrayed Crane in the 1922 silent film The Headless Horseman.
- Crane is one of the title characters in The Adventures of Ichabod and Mr. Toad (1949), which was produced by Walt Disney Productions and packaged with a companion 30-minute short "The Wind in the Willows" based on Kenneth Grahame's The Wind in the Willows. It is probably the best-known version, as it ran for years as part of the television Halloween special Disney's Halloween Treat and is considered one of the truest adaptations of the Irving story. This animated interpretation features Bing Crosby as the narrator and sole voice actor of the entire 30-minute piece and extends both the role of Ichabod Crane to make his (Crane's) singing that of a crooner instead of the nasal psalmodist described in the story and that of Brom Bones to include the latter as the singer of the song about the Horseman's legend.
- Jeff Goldblum starred as Ichabod Crane in The Legend of Sleepy Hollow (1980), an NBC-produced made-for-television movie. In this version, the story ends with Ichabod arriving at Katrina's house and the Headless Horseman returning to the dark forest after having dealt with an imposter.
- Ed Begley, Jr. portrayed Ichabod Crane in a 1985 adaptation by Lan O'Kun for Shelley Duvall's Tall Tales and Legends, directed by Edd Griles, which also starred Beverly D'Angelo as Katrina, Tim Thomerson as Brom and Charles Durning as narrator Doffue van Tassel, Katrina's uncle. This version definitively identifies Brom as the Headless Horseman who chases Ichabod but also adds a twist ending that takes place on the night after Halloween.
- Crane appears as a ghost in a third-season episode of Nickelodeon's Are You Afraid of the Dark? called "The Tale of the Midnight Ride", portrayed by Arthur Holden.
- The character is featured in a two-part Halloween episode of the PBS television series Wishbone (1997), in which Crane is portrayed by the title character.
- In the TV-show Seinfeld, in episode 9x16 "The Burning" (1998), at 5:40 min in the episode, George Costanza makes a joke about Ichabod Crane. The joke refers to a statue with a head too small, and George says: "Why don't we smooth the head down to nothing, stick a pumpkin under its arm and change the nameplate to Ichabod Crane?" He wrongly refers to the statue as Ichabod Crane, but he actually meant the Headless Horseman from the story The Legend of Sleepy Hollow.
- Constable Ichabod Crane serves as the protagonist in Sleepy Hollow (1999), directed by Tim Burton and starring Johnny Depp. In this interpretation, he is a New York City policeman from a family of noble origin with an interest in forensic science sent to Sleepy Hollow to investigate a series of grisly murders to prove the merits of his style of the investigation, after he argues against the police's current methods. As in the original story, his horse is named Gunpowder. Ichabod's most notable traits in the movie include an ahead-of-his-time liking for post-mortem examinations, deduction, and scientific methods, as well as his being very quirky, skittish, and disturbed by death and blood, despite his occupation. His backstory is also explored: when he was seven his mother, an "innocent child of Nature" was "murdered to save her soul" by his father, "a Bible black tyrant behind a mask of righteousness", which led to a loss of faith for him. It is Ichabod who finally releases the Hessian Headless Horseman (Christopher Walken) from the control of Lady van Tassel (Miranda Richardson), whom the Horseman takes to Hell with him. Katrina Van Tassel (Christina Ricci) is seen at the end of the movie going to New York with Ichabod, along with a boy who helped him in the investigation. Brom Bones (Casper Van Dien), who at one point does disguise himself as the Horseman and throws a pumpkin at Ichabod, is killed by the real Horseman halfway in the film.
- In 1999, a telefilm entitled The Legend of Sleepy Hollow aired on Odyssey starring Brent Carver as Ichabod Crane. It was filmed in Montreal.
- The 1999 animated FoX TV special The Night of the Headless Horseman featured William H. Macy as the voice of Crane. This version has an ending that reveals that Brom (voiced by Luke Perry) had made a "Devil's bargain" with the Horseman that he was forced to fulfill thirty years later.
- In the 62nd episode of the 1999 TV show titled The Sopranos, the character Tony Blundetto (portrayed by Steve Buscemi) tells Christopher Moltisanti (portrayed by Michael Imperioli) that "They used to call me Ichabod Crane." When asked who by Christopher, Tony tells him that it was some "very sorry people." Later in the episode when Christopher is being laughed at by Tony Blundetto, he tells him, "I could've called you Ichabod Crane, but I didn't," which upsets Tony.
- In the 22nd episode of the 10th season of the sit-com Frasier, entitled: "Fathers and Sons" (2003) Roz Doyle (Peri Gilpin) secretly writes the name "Ichabod Crane" as the name of Nile's and Daphanie's future son, on a kindergarten application form.
- The 2004 TV movie The Hollow centres on a high school student named Ian Cranston (portrayed by Kevin Zegers), a descendant of Ichabod Crane.
- Crane is mentioned in Kanye West's 2010 single Runaway with Pusha T.
- Tom Mison plays Crane in Sleepy Hollow (2013), an American supernatural/police drama television series. The series is considered a "modern-day retelling" with Crane being a former professor of history at Oxford University prior to the American Revolution, he came to America with the British before switching sides and becoming a spy for the Colonials. Having beheaded the Horseman in 1781, he was brought back to life in modern times with the Horseman due to their blood mixing when they died.
  - This version of Crane also appears in the 2015 Halloween episode of the TV series Bones. Other mentions and references to the Sleepy Hollow TV series exist throughout the episode.
- Ichabod Crane is also featured in the 2013 episodic video game, The Wolf Among Us, developed and produced by Telltale Games. In the game, Crane (voiced by Roger L. Jackson) is the deputy mayor of Fabletown, a secret community of magical, fairytale beings who were exiled from their homelands centuries ago, and forced to live in the world of mundane humans. In episodes 2 through 3, Crane was revealed to have been soliciting prostitutes and using a magic spell to make them look like his assistant Snow White; Sheriff Bigby Wolf and Snow arrest Crane for this and embezzling Fabletown's money to pay for them, but Crane is then kidnapped by the minions of the Crooked Man, the crime lord Crane owes money to.
- Ichabod Crane's ghost is featured in an episode of the Disney Junior show Vampirina titled "A Tale of Two Hollows", voiced by Taran Killam. In keeping with the show's aim at entertaining young audiences, Crane and the Headless Horseman are revealed to be enemies due to "the bridge incident". In the end, the two of them make up with one another when they realize that it was all due to one big misunderstanding.
- In 2022, Sean Persaud portrayed Ichabod Crane in Headless: A Sleepy Hollow Story, a modern-day web series adaptation where Ichabod agrees to help the Headless Horseman find his head and break his curse.
