= Niverville, New York =

- Hamlet and CDP
- Location within New York Location within the United States
- Coordinates: 42°26′34″N 73°39′33″W
- Country: United States
- State: New York
- County: Columbia
- Towns: Kinderhook, Chatham
- Settled: 1665

Area
  - Total: 3.42 sq mi (8.86 km^{2})
  - Land: 2.87 sq mi (7.44 km^{2})
  - Water: 0.54 sq mi (1.41 km^{2})
- Elevation: 292 ft (89 m)

Population (2020)
  - Total: 1,508
  - Density: 524.6/sq mi (202.56/km^{2})
- Time zone: UTC-5 (Eastern (EST))
  - Summer (DST): UTC-4 (EDT)
- ZIP Codes: 12130 (Niverville); 12184 (Valatie)
- Area code: 518
- FIPS code: 36-51297

Niverville is a semi-rural hamlet and census-designated place (CDP) in northern Columbia County, New York, United States. The hamlet of Niverville is located in the town of Kinderhook, south of Kinderhook Lake. The Niverville CDP includes the hamlet as well as all of the land surrounding Kinderhook Lake, extending east into the town of Chatham. The population of the CDP was 1,508 at the 2020 census.

== History ==
Niverville was first settled by the Dutch; the first house was built circa 1707 by Louren Lourenson Van Alen, who obtained the Kinderhoeck Patent—a land grant—in 1629 from Jan Hendrickse DeBruyn, including the area now known as Niverville. Located within the hamlet, Kinderhook Lake—originally called Wogasawoochuk or "Big Fish Lake" by the Mohican early Native American inhabitants—provided fertile, peat-rich soil that supported numerous orchards and farms.

The Niver cousins—John Niver and John M. Niver—emigrated to the area from Germany in the early nineteenth century. They built the first gristmill for rye flour; their prosperity built the Niver mansion just across the bridge along County Route 28 in 1848. The hamlet was ultimately named "Niverville" after the prosperous Nivers, although it was long known as Kinderhook Station, after its Boston and Albany Railroad, and Kinderhook and Hudson Railroad turntable, built in 1841. The railroad restaurant known as the Van Hoesen House (not to be confused with the Jan Van Hoesen House some 20 miles south in Claverack) has since become the Niverville Pub.

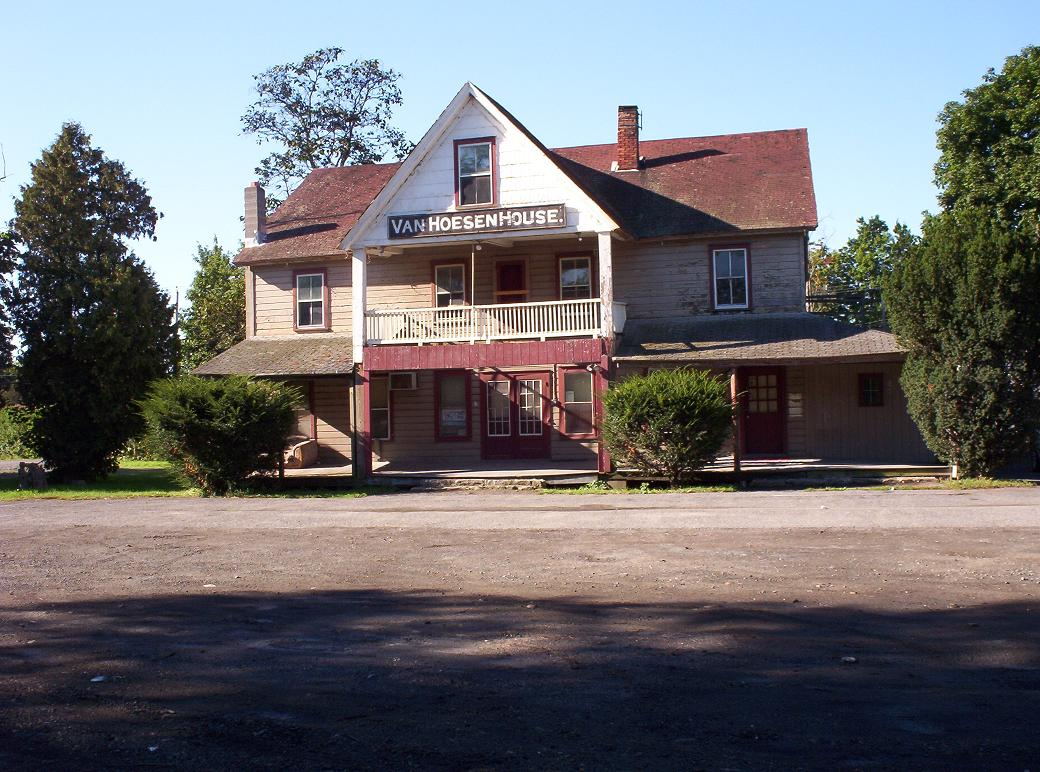
The Van Hoesen House, a.k.a. Kinderhook Station on the Boston & Albany Railroad, as seen in 2005

In 1846, the Niverville Post Office was established with less than twenty business and residential addresses. Niverville's first park—Kinderhook Lake Park, aka The Old Park—was established in 1870 as a picnic and meeting place.

By 1899 the railroad trolleys were electrified and Niverville's Electric Park was founded along Kinderhook Lake. Lit by colored lights, the amusement park featured two Ferris wheels (one run by steam, the other by electricity), a carousel, a roller coaster, and other rides, as well as live vaudeville performances held in a dancing pavilion, an aquarium stocked with native fish, and a bathing beach alongside the lake's popular boating and fishing activities.

The Niverville Fire Department, established in 1916, is a central community hub serving Kinderhook Lake, residents of adjacent Chatham town along the eastern edge of the lake, and Niverville residents. The current firehouse sits on 13 acres (5.3 ha) of land purchased by the Fire Department in 1965. The department maintains an impressive collection of fire trucks—including a vintage 1935 Ford chassis with a Ward LaFrance fire engine body—which are put to use in local parades and festivities, including Niverville's Fourth of July fund raiser. The department also hosts an annual Halloween Parade and Party. The Ladies' Auxiliary of the Niverville Fire Department is an important and active community group who offer refreshments and assist members of the Fire Department in any way possible before/during and after emergency situations. In addition, the Ladies host dinners, banquets, and other fundraisers for the purchase of Fire Department equipment. The centennial anniversary of the founding of the Niverville Fire Department was in 2016.

Niverville is served by the nearby Valatie Free Library, a member of the Mid-Hudson Library System.

== Geography ==
Niverville is located in the northeastern part of the town of Kinderhook at 42°26′46″N 73°39′16″W (42.446211, -73.654549). The area listed by the U.S. Census as Niverville extends east into the town of Chatham so that it surrounds Kinderhook Lake. New York State Route 203 passes east of the hamlet proper and along the eastern shore of Kinderhook Lake, leading southwest 2 miles (3 km) to Valatie and northeast 6 miles (10 km) to Nassau.

According to the United States Census Bureau, the area has a total area of 3.4 square miles (8.9 km^{2}), of which 2.9 square miles (7.4 km^{2}) is land and 0.54 square miles (1.4 km^{2}), or 15.94%, is water, primarily Kinderhook Lake. The lake is located along Valatie Kill, a southwestward-flowing tributary of Kinderhook Creek in the Hudson River Valley.

== Demographics ==
Historical population
Census	Pop.	Note	%±
2000	1,737		—
2010	1,662		−4.3%
2020	1,508		−9.3%
U.S. Decennial Census

As of the census of 2010, there were 1,662 people, 682 households, and 476 families residing in the hamlet. The population density was 486.01 inhabitants per square mile (187.65/km^{2}). There were 837 housing units at an average density of 290.0 per square mile (112.0/km^{2}). The racial makeup of the CDP was 96.27% White, 0.84% African American, 0.60% Asian, 0.06% Native American, 0.84% from other races, and 1.38% from two or more races. Hispanic or Latino of any race were 2.05% of the population.

Niverville median household income is $62,679 in 2006-2010 and has grown by 35.41% since 2000. The income growth rate is higher than the state average rate of 24.79% and is much higher than the national average rate of 19.17%. The per capita income for the CDP was $23,109. About 2.8% of families and 8.2% of the population were below the poverty line, including 6.0% of those under age 18 and 6.0% of those age 65 or over.

There were 682 households, out of which 33.0% had children under the age of 18 living with them, 58.2% were married couples living together, 8.7% had a female householder with no husband present, and 30.1% were non-families. 23.8% of all households were made up of individuals, and 8.1% had someone living alone who was 65 years of age or older. The average household size was 2.53 and the average family size was 3.02.

In the community, the population was spread out, with 24.7% under the age of 18, 6.4% from 18 to 24, 30.4% from 25 to 44, 26.9% from 45 to 64, and 11.6% who were 65 years of age or older. The median age was 38 years. For every 100 females, there were 99.7 males. For every 100 females age 18 and over, there were 95.8 males.

== Education ==
It is in the Kinderhook Central School District (Ichabod Crane).
