= The Legend of Sleepy Hollow =

1820 short story by Washington Irving

- Short story by Washington Irving
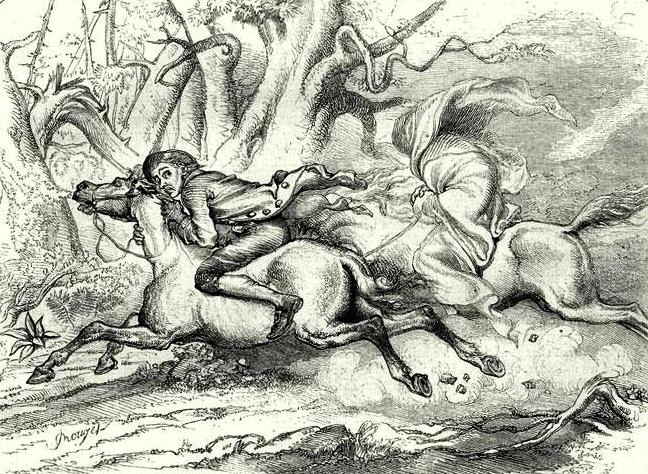
- Ichabod Crane pursued by the Headless Horseman, by F. O. C. Darley, 1849

Text available at Wikisource
- Country: United States
- Language: English

Publication
- Published in: The Sketch Book of Geoffrey Crayon, Gent.
- Media type: Hardback, paperback and online
- Publication date: 1820

Chronology
- Series: The Sketch Book
The Angler	L'Envoy

The Legend of Sleepy Hollow
The short story read by Chip from the LibriVox project

The Legend of Sleepy Hollow is an 1820 short story by American author Washington Irving contained in his collection of 34 essays and short stories titled The Sketch Book of Geoffrey Crayon, Gent. Irving wrote the story while living in Birmingham, England.

The Legend of Sleepy Hollow is among the earliest examples of American fiction with enduring appeal along with Rip Van Winkle. Irving's early literary success with The Sketch Book established his career, providing the financial means to support himself and his family as a professional writer. The Legend has remained continuously in print since its initial publication and is one of Irving's most popular works.

It has been adapted for the screen several times, including a 1922 silent film and a 1949 Walt Disney animation as one of two segments in the package film The Adventures of Ichabod and Mr. Toad.

== Plot ==
The story takes place around 1790 in a quiet rural area near Tarrytown, in a secluded valley known as Sleepy Hollow. The place is peaceful and picturesque, yet famous for strange tales and lingering superstitions among its residents.

Ichabod Crane, a tall, thin, and highly superstitious schoolteacher from Connecticut, comes to live there. Though he appears timid and awkward, he is ambitious and dreams of improving his social status. He sets his sights on Katrina Van Tassel, the only daughter of a wealthy farmer. More than being in love, Ichabod is attracted to the comfort and prosperity that marrying her would provide.

However, he faces competition from Abraham Van Brunt (known as "Brom Bones"), a strong, confident, and mischievous local known for his bold personality. Instead of challenging Ichabod directly, Brom chooses to mock and frighten him with tricks and practical jokes, taking advantage of the schoolmaster's nervous nature.

One autumn evening, Ichabod is invited to a quilting frolic and general merrymaking at the Van Tassel farm. He rides there on a borrowed horse named Gunpowder. At the party, he eats heartily, socializes enthusiastically, and feels hopeful about winning Katrina's affection. During the gathering, guests share eerie legends, especially the story of the Headless Horseman — said to be the ghost of a Hessian cavalryman who lost his head in battle during the Revolutionary War and now roams the area at night searching for it.

After the festivities end, Ichabod stays behind to speak privately with Katrina, likely intending to propose. However, he leaves disappointed and upset. As he rides home alone in the dark, the ghost stories replay in his mind, heightening his fear. He reaches a dark, gloomy glen by a bridge, the spot where the British Major André had been captured in the Revolution, and which is thought haunted by his ghost.

Ichabod then sees a mysterious, cloaked rider on a massive black horse. The menacing figure silently accompanies him for some distance. When fully visible, he is revealed to be headless. Terrified, Ichabod races toward a bridge by the old village church, believing that crossing it will save him, since legend claims the ghost cannot pass it. Just as he nears safety, the rider throws what seems to be his severed head at Ichabod, knocking him to the ground.

The next morning, Ichabod is nowhere to be found. His horse returns home, but all that anyone can find of the schoolmaster, near the church bridge, are his hat and a smashed pumpkin. Soon afterward, Katrina marries Brom Bones, who seems amused whenever the story is mentioned. The broken pumpkin suggests the "head" may not have been real, leaving open the possibility that Brom staged the entire event.

As Ichabod had not been indebted to anyone at his disappearance, the villagers largely forget about him. They find a new schoolmaster and move the school to another part of the village. Several years later, a local farmer returning from a visit to New York City reports that Ichabod is alive and prospering as a justice of the peace - though this is disbelieved by old local housewives, who believe the teacher had been carried off by the Headless Horseman. His old schoolhouse is left abandoned, falls into ruin, and is believed to be haunted by Ichabod's spirit.

In the end, the mystery remains unresolved — was it truly a ghost, or merely a clever trick? The tale is later retold by a narrator who admits that he is not entirely sure what to believe, leaving the audience to decide for themselves.

== Background ==
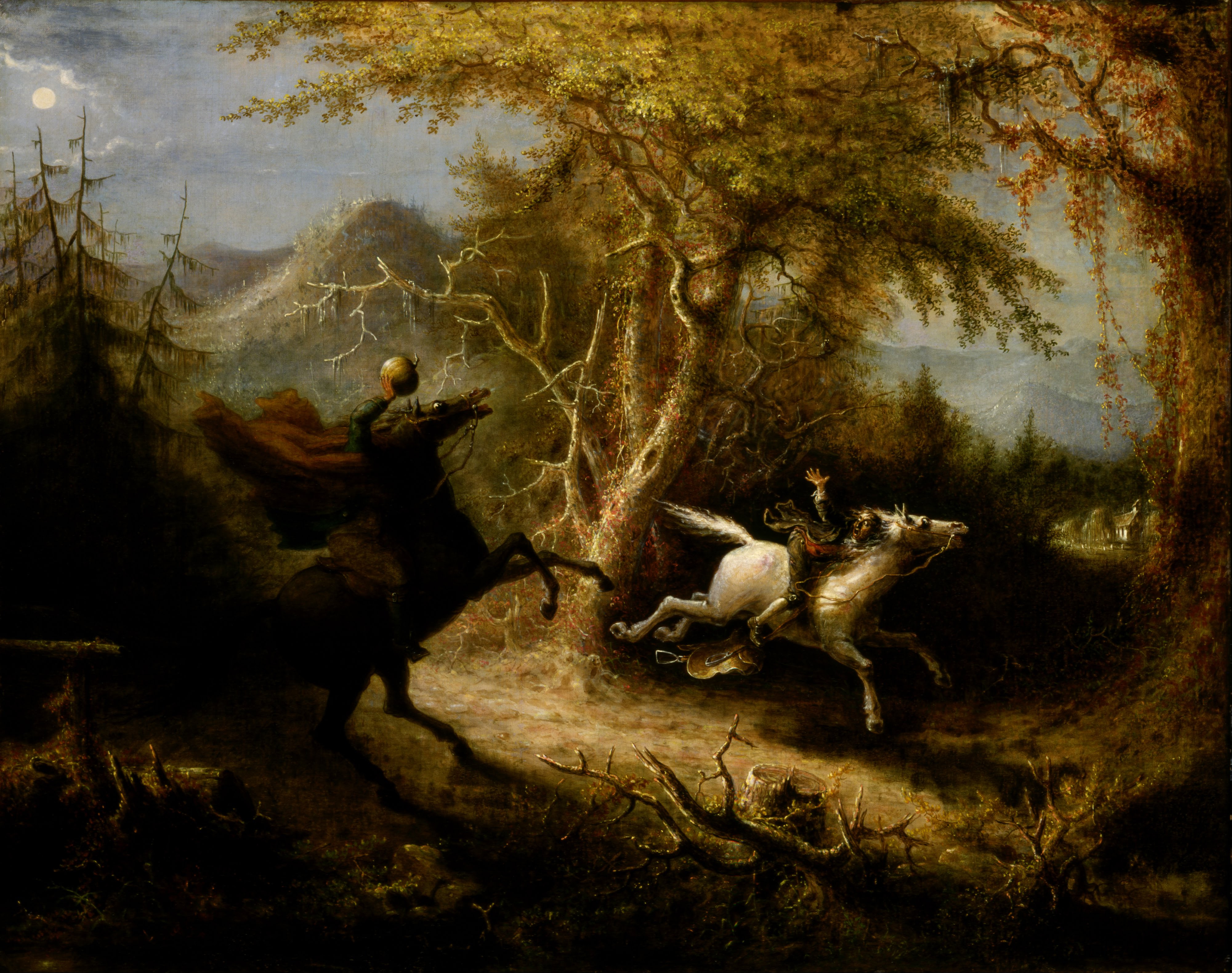
The Headless Horseman Pursuing Ichabod Crane (1858) by John Quidor

The story was the longest one published as part of The Sketch Book of Geoffrey Crayon, Gent. (commonly referred to as The Sketch Book), issued as a serial by Irving throughout 1819 and 1820 under the pseudonym "Geoffrey Crayon". Irving wrote The Sketch Book during a tour of Europe, and parts of the tale may also be traced to European origins. Headless horsemen were staples of northern Europe storytelling, featured in German, Irish (e.g., Dullahan), Scandinavian (e.g., the Wild Hunt), and British legends, and included in Robert Burns's Scots poem "Tam o' Shanter" (1790) and Gottfried August Bürger's Der Wilde Jäger (1778), translated as The Wild Huntsman (1796).

These specters were usually viewed as omens of ill fortune for those who chose to disregard their apparitions. They found their victims in proud, scheming persons and characters with hubris and arrogance. One particularly influential rendition of this folktale is the last of the "Legenden von Rübezahl" ('Legends of Rübezahl') from Johann Karl August Musäus's literary retellings of German folktales Volksmärchen der Deutschen (1783).

The country south of the Bronx River was abandoned by the Continental Army and occupied by the British after the Battle of White Plains in October 1776. The Americans were fortified north of Peekskill, leaving Westchester County a 30-mile (48 km) stretch of "Neutral Ground," a scorched and desolated no man's land vulnerable to outlaws, raiders, and vigilantes. Droves of Loyalist rangers, British light infantry, and Hessian Jägers (renowned sharpshooters and horsemen) were among the raiders who often skirmished with Patriot militias. The Headless Horseman may have been partly based on the rumored discovery of a headless corpse in Sleepy Hollow, New York, after the Battle of White Plains, later reburied in an unmarked grave in the Old Dutch Burying Ground. There is a record of an anonymous Hessian soldier being decapitated by a cannonball during the battle, but there is no documented record of his body being found and buried.

According to another hypothesis, Irving could have drawn the figure of the "headless rider" from German Silesian literature, from the Chronicle of Sprottau by J. G. Kreis, written in the first half of the 19th century. In the 19th century, police counselor Kreis noted that the inhabitants of this city were afraid to move after dusk on Hospitalstrasse (now Sądowa Street) due to the headless rider apparition seen there. Walter Scott encouraged Irving to learn German to be able to read stories, ballads, and legends in their native language.

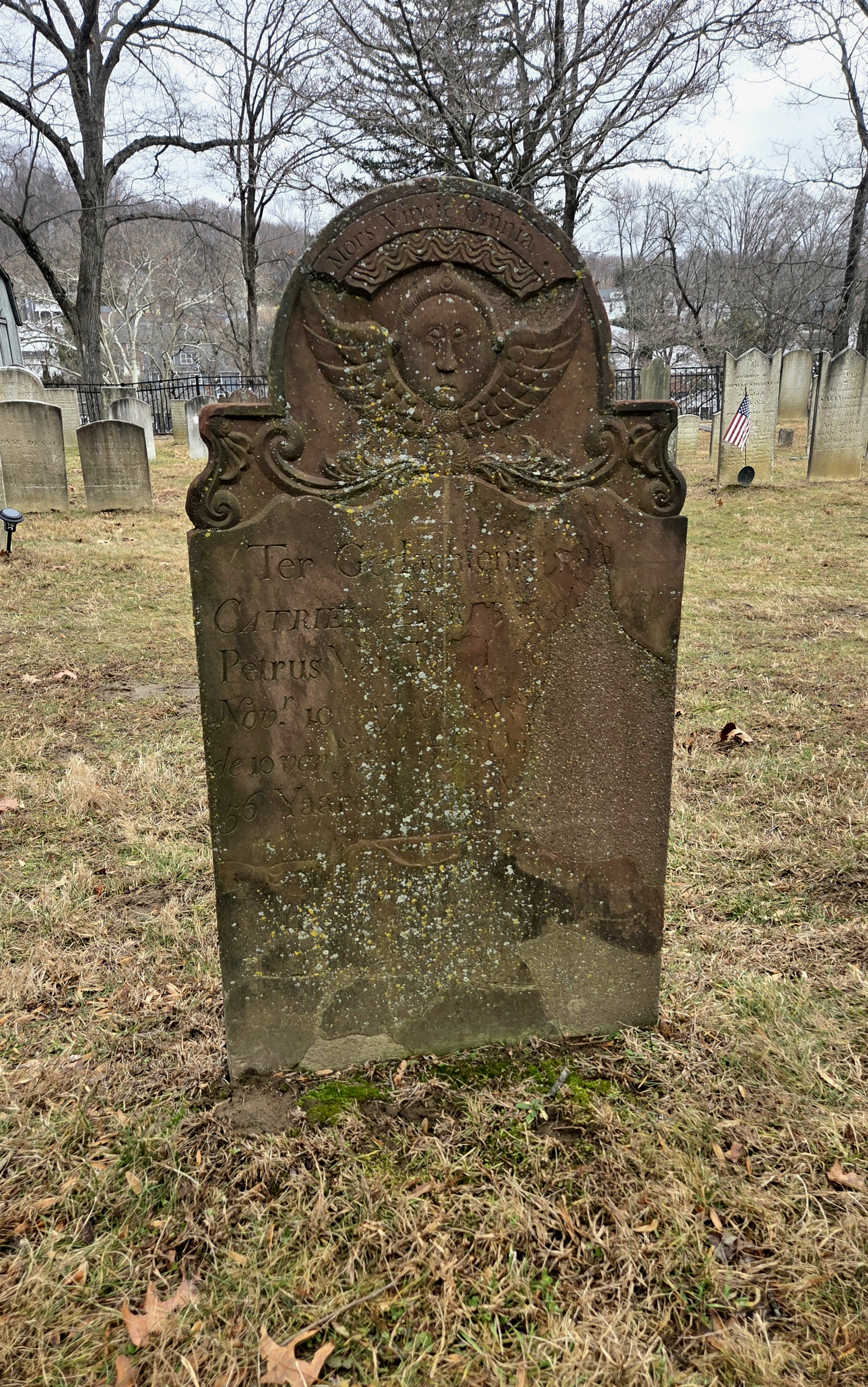
Headstone of Catriena Ecker Van Tassel in the Burying Ground of the Old Dutch Church of Sleepy Hollow

Irving was an aide-de-camp to New York Governor Daniel D. Tompkins when he met an army captain named Ichabod Crane in Sackets Harbor, New York, during an inspection tour of fortifications in 1814. Irving may have patterned the character after Jesse Merwin, who taught at the local schoolhouse in Kinderhook, further north along the Hudson River, where Irving spent several months in 1809. Alternatively, it is claimed by many in the Tarrytown area that Samuel Youngs, a local schoolteacher and Irving's friend, is the individual from whom Irving drew his character. Author Gary Denniss asserts that Crane is loosely based on Merwin and may also include elements from Youngs's life.

The names of local residents who may have served as inspirations are all found on gravestones in the historic Burying Ground of the Old Dutch Church of Sleepy Hollow. Washington Irving's own final resting place is also located there, just 150 feet away from the graves of those who inspired his characters, in the oldest part of Sleepy Hollow Cemetery.

The local landmarks Raven Rock and Spook Rock in Rockefeller State Park Preserve are also associated with locations mentioned in The Legend, as are the Old Dutch Church and Philipsburg Manor House; the manor house probably stood in for the farmhouse of Baltus Van Tassel and his daughter Katrina.

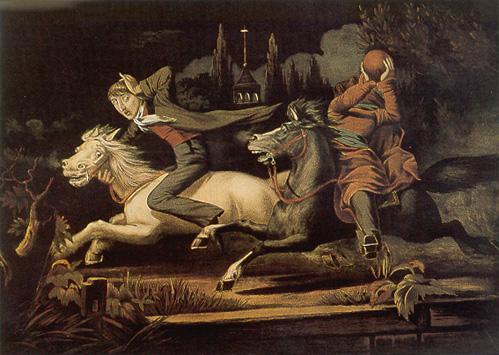
Ichabod Crane, Respectfully Dedicated to Washington Irving. William J. Wilgus (1819–53), artist chromolithograph, c. 1856

The Legend of Sleepy Hollow is one of Irving's most anthologized, studied, and adapted sketches, along with Rip Van Winkle. Both stories are often paired together in books and other representations, and both are included in surveys of early American literature and Romanticism. Irving's depictions of regional culture and themes of progress versus tradition, supernatural intervention in the commonplace, and the plight of the romantic hero permeate both stories and helped to develop a unique sense of American culture during the early 19th century.

== Adaptations ==
=== Film ===
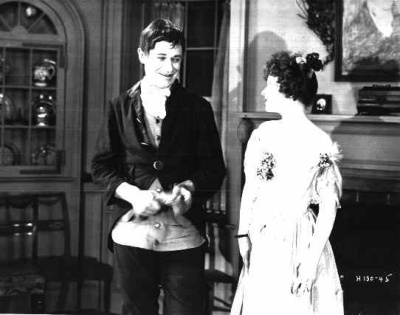
Will Rogers as Ichabod Crane in The Headless Horseman (1922)

- The Headless Horseman (1922), a silent film directed by Edward Venturini and starring Will Rogers as Ichabod Crane
- The Headless Horseman (1934), an animated short film directed by Ub Iwerks. The short depicts the horseman as merely a story, with Brom Bones pranking and frightening Ichabod Crane away from Katrina Van Tassel. The film somewhat departs from the original ending by showing Ichabod getting his revenge, dressing up as the Headless Horseman, and crashing Brom and Katrina's wedding.
- The Adventures of Ichabod and Mr. Toad (1949), an animated adaptation directed by James Algar, Clyde Geronimi, and Jack Kinney, produced by Walt Disney Productions, and narrated by Bing Crosby. This version is more lighthearted and family-friendly than Irving's original story and most other adaptations.
- Sleepy Hollow (1999), a feature film adaption directed by Tim Burton. Unlike the original story and other movie adaptations, this film has a happy ending for Ichabod with him and Katrina ending up together. Crane is also changed in character from being a superstitious schoolteacher from Connecticut to a skeptical New York City constable.

=== Literature ===
- The Spellbook of Katrina Van Tassel: A Story of Sleepy Hollow by Alyssa Palombo, published in 2018. A re-telling of The Legend of Sleepy Hollow in which Ichabod Crane and Katrina Van Tassel actually fall in love, but after Ichabod mysteriously vanishes Katrina is determined to discover the truth about his disappearance.
- Horseman: A Tale of Sleepy Hollow by Christina Henry, a fictional horror novel published in 2021. It takes place in Sleepy Hollow three decades after the events of the original story and is told from the point of view of teenager Ben Van Brunt, the only grandchild of Abraham "Brom Bones" Van Brunt and Katrina Van Tassel.
- The Unhallowed Horseman by Jude S. Walko, a gothic horror novel published in 2021, with a foreword by noted chronicler of Hudson Valley lore Jonathan Kruk. The modern day town of Sleepy Hollow is cursed during the Triduum of the Hallows. while direct descendants of Washington Irving's original characters are reimagined in contemporary times. They must fight off the sins of their forefathers, and the Headless Horseman himself. Voted AudioBookReviewer's 2024 Gothic Horror Novel of the Year.
- Hollow and Legend by Karina Halle, a fictional gothic romance duology published in 2023. In this retelling, Katrina Van Tassell is a witch attending Sleepy Hollow Institute, where Ichabod Crane is a professor. Brom Bones is her former betrothed with a dark secret.
- Raven Rock by Nichole Louise, a prequel to The Legend of Sleepy Hollow, published in 2023.

=== Television ===
- The Legend of Sleepy Hollow (1972)
- "The Headless Horseman of Halloween" (1976), the first season's fifth episode of Hanna-Barbera's The Scooby-Doo Show starring Scooby, the gang, and Scooby's cousin, Scooby-Dum. While celebrating at a Halloween party hosted by one of Ichabod Crane's great granddaughters, the gang finds themselves facing a whole new mystery with a sighting of none other than the Headless Horseman.
- The New Misadventures of Ichabod Crane (1979)
- The Legend of Sleepy Hollow (1980), a television film directed by Henning Schellerup and filmed in Utah, starring Jeff Goldblum as Ichabod Crane, Meg Foster as Katrina Van Tassel, and Dick Butkus as Brom Bones. Executive producer Charles Sellier was nominated for an Emmy Award for his work on the movie.
- The Legend of Sleepy Hollow (1985), the premiere episode of Shelley Duvall's Tall Tales & Legends, stars Ed Begley Jr. as Ichabod Crane, Beverly D'Angelo as Katrina, Tim Thomerson as Brom, and Charles Durning as Doffue Van Tassel, who is also the narrator.
- An episode of Are You Afraid of the Dark?, "The Tale of the Midnight Ride" which aired January 8, 1994 in which children meet and interact with Ichabod Crane, derailing the events of the original story and causing the headless horseman to pursue them instead.
- Wishbone had an episode adapting the story with the dog Wishbone as Ichabod Crane.
- The Legend of Sleepy Hollow (1999), an Odyssey Network TV movie starring Brent Carver
- Night Of The Headless Horseman (1999), an CG animated TV special starring William H. Macy as Ichabod and Clancy Brown as the horseman
- The Hollow (2004), an ABC Family television film starring Kevin Zegers and Kaley Cuoco and focusing on a teenage descendant of Ichabod Crane
- Sleepy Hollow (2013), a crime/horror series in which Ichabod Crane awakens in the 21st century and teams up with Lt. Abbie Mills of the Sleepy Hollow Sheriff's Department to stop the Horseman. The show ran for four seasons.
- Headless: A Sleepy Hollow Story (2022), a web series in which Ichabod Crane and the Headless Horseman are roommates and have to work together to solve the mystery of the Horseman's head.
- An episode of Murder, She Wrote, season three, titled Night of the Headless Horseman.

=== Music ===
- In Sleepy Hollow (1913), a piano suite by Eastwood Lane
- "The Legend of Sleepy Hollow" (1958) by doo-wop band the Monotones
- "Sleepy Hollow" (1965) by singer Roy Orbison, later remastered in 2016
- "Legend of the Headless Rider" (1993) by Danish heavy metal band Mercyful Fate
- The Headless Horseman (2001) by Michael Jeffrey Shapiro, for baritone, itinerant string band, and orchestra
- "Sleepy Hollow" (2004) by Danish power metal band Pyramaze
- "Sleepy Hollow" (2013) by metal band Blitzkrieg
- "Undead Ahead 2: The Tale of the Midnight Ride" (2019) by Motionless in White
- "Sleepy Hollow" (2020), a single by hip-hop artist Trippie Redd
- "Sleepy Hollow (Love Is Scary)" (2020), a single by Kristen Lawrence

=== Theatre ===
- Sleepy Hollow (1948), a Broadway musical with music by George Lessner and book and lyrics by Russell Maloney and Miriam Battista. It lasted 12 performances.
- Sleepy Hollow (2009), a musical with book and lyrics by Jim Christian and music by Tom Edward Clark. It premiered at Weber State University in Ogden, Utah, on October 30, 2009. It received the 2010 American College Theatre Festival Musical Theatre Award.
- The Hollow (2011), a musical by Matt Conner and Hunter Foster. It premiered at the Signature Theatre Company in Arlington, Virginia.
- Sleepy Hollow - A Legendary Musical (2017), a musical by Michelle Ackerman
- Tarrytown (2018), a musical by Adam Wachter. Its world premiere production at Backyard Renaissance Theatre Company won the 2018 San Diego Theatre Critics' Circle Craig Noel Award for Best New Musical. A studio cast recording starring Jeremy Jordan, Krysta Rodriguez, and Andy Mientus was released in 2020 to benefit the Actors Fund's COVID-19 relief efforts.
- Ichabod: The Legend of Sleepy Hollow (2022), a new production combining Conner's 2011 score with a new book by Stephen Gregory Smith that stays truer to Irving's story.

=== Audio ===
There have been numerous audio readings and adaptations, including:

- Ronald Colman was the host and narrator for a radio adaptation on NBC's Favorite Story on July 2, 1946 (requested by Walter Huston as that actor's favorite story).
- An adaptation was broadcast on September 19, 1947, on NBC University of the Air: American Novels.
- Bing Crosby re-created his Disney narration in Walt Disney's Ichabod and the Legend of Sleepy Hollow for Decca Records (DAU-725) in 1949.
- In 1950, Hallmark Playhouse broadcast an adaptation starring Lionel Barrymore as the narrator.
- In 2005, BBC Radio 7 broadcast a three-part reading of the story narrated by Martin Jarvis, broadcast several times since on BBC Radio 4 Extra.
- In 2009, Historic Hudson Valley released an unabridged dramatic reading by Jonathan Kruk, with musical effects by Matt Noble.
- Tom Mison, who starred as Ichabod Crane on the Fox television series Sleepy Hollow, narrated the story in 2014 for Audible Studios.
- In 2019, the radio program Adventures in Odyssey produced an adaptation of the story titled "Icky and Kat and Balty and Bones".
- In 2020, the story was adapted into a full-cast audio production by Shadows at the Door: the Podcast.
- A new adaptation by Sami Ibrahim was broadcast on 25 January 2026 on BBC Radio 4 as part of BBC Radio's Story of America, a major collection of dramatisations marking 250 years since the Declaration of Independence, with Calam Lynch as Ichabod, Sasha McCabe as Katrina and Victor Alli as Brom Bones.

=== Comics ===
- The 2022 graphic novel Hollow is based on the story.

=== Theme Parks ===
- The Legend roller coaster at Holiday World in Santa Claus, Indiana, is based on the frightful ride of Ichabod Crane running from the Headless Horseman.

=== Video games ===
- In Guts & Blackpowder, the Halloween event features twos maps with Sleepy Hollow, where players encounter and beat the Headless Horseman.

== Geographic impact ==
Sleepy Hollow, New York, as the setting for the story, contains many of the referenced locations, including ones that can still be visited today. Sleepy Hollow, Illinois; Sleepy Hollow, Marin County, California; and Sleepy Hollow, Wyoming, have street names that reference the story. The last of these hosts an annual event called Sleepy Hollow Days. There is also a Sleepy Hollow State Park in Laingsburg, Michigan. The original schoolhouse in Kinderhook, New York, is now owned by the Columbia County Historical Society and called the Ichabod Crane Schoolhouse. The area's modern-day school district, Ichabod Crane Central School District, is also named for the character.

== See also ==
- Ghost films
- Ghost stories
- Old Dutch Church of Sleepy Hollow § Old Dutch Burying Ground
