= Van Allen House =

Historic house in New Jersey, United States

- U.S. National Register of Historic Places
- New Jersey Register of Historic Places
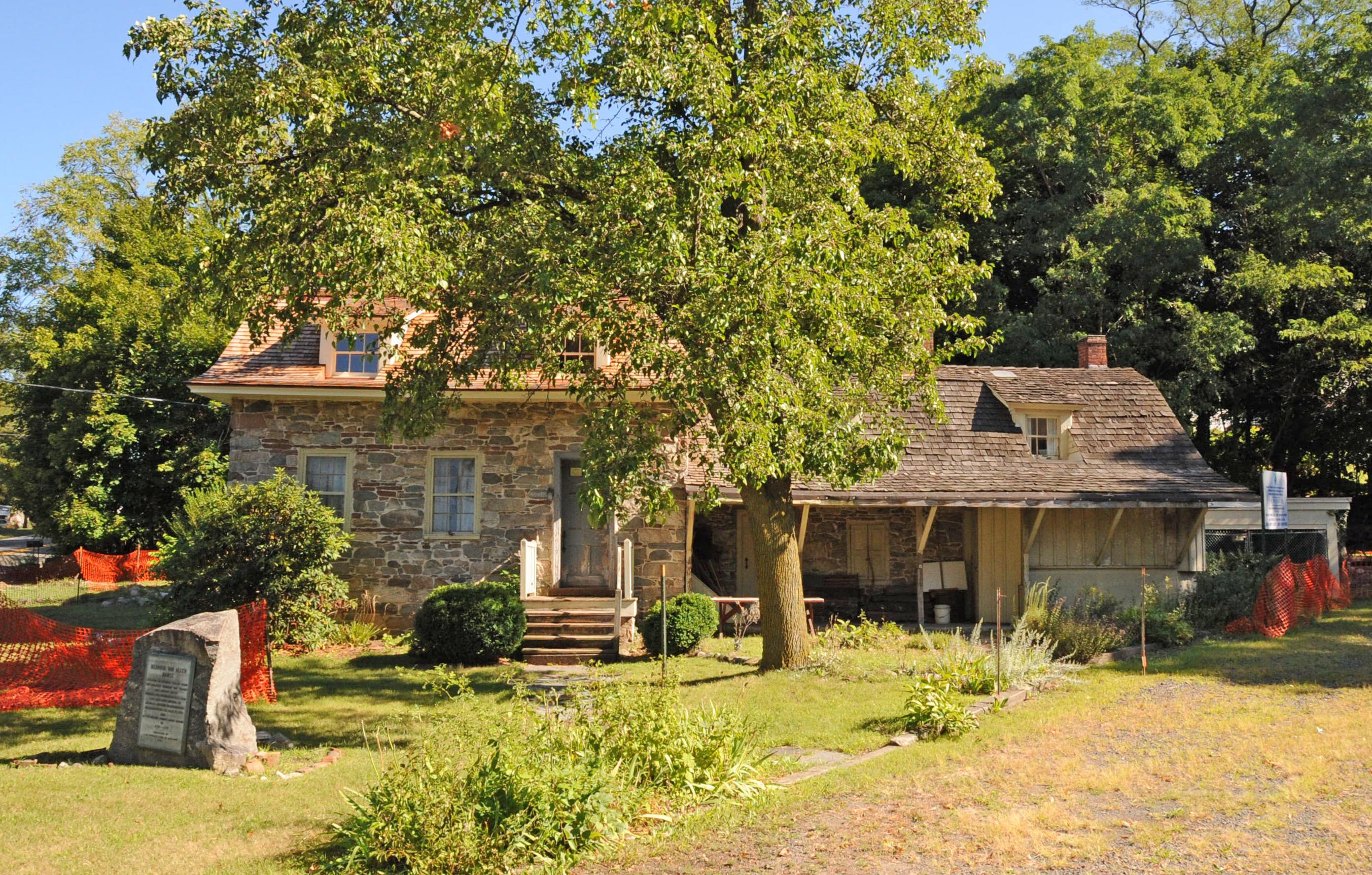
- Van Allen House in 2015

- Location within Bergen County, New Jersey Location within New Jersey Location within the United States
- Location: Corner of U.S. 202 and Franklin Avenue, Oakland, New Jersey
- Coordinates: 41°1′47″N 74°14′11″W
- Area: less than one acre
- Built: 1740
- NRHP reference No.: 73001080
- NJRHP No.: 604

Significant dates
- Added to NRHP: July 24, 1973
- Designated NJRHP: June 13, 1973

The Van Allen House is located in Oakland, Bergen County, New Jersey, United States. The house was built around 1740 and was added to the National Register of Historic Places on July 24, 1973.

== History ==
The Van Allen House was built around 1740 as the home of farmer Hendrik Van Allen. During the Revolutionary War, it served as the headquarters for George Washington on July 14, 1777. At the time, he was moving his troops from Morristown, New Jersey to New York. In 1778 and 1779, Bergen County used the house as a court. Edward Day Page, dairy farmer, businessman, and Oakand's second mayor, owned the house as well as the northern fourth of Oakland in the late nineteenth and early twentieth century. It was saved from demolition by the Oakland Historical society with aid from the Woman's Club of Oakland. It is now maintained as a museum displaying colonial Dutch life. There were several branches of the family in the Paterson Passaic Bergen, New Jersey area.

== See also ==
- National Register of Historic Places listings in Bergen County, New Jersey
- List of Washington's Headquarters during the Revolutionary War
- Van Alen House Another old house with similar family name is in Columbia County, New York, which may have been the loyalist branch of the Van Alen Van Allen family.
- John Evert Van Alen House And another house of the same family, the Van Alen House, in Defreetsville, NY, across from Albany.
