= Van Alen House =

Historic house in New York, United States

- Luykas Van Alen House
- U.S. National Register of Historic Places
- U.S. National Historic Landmark
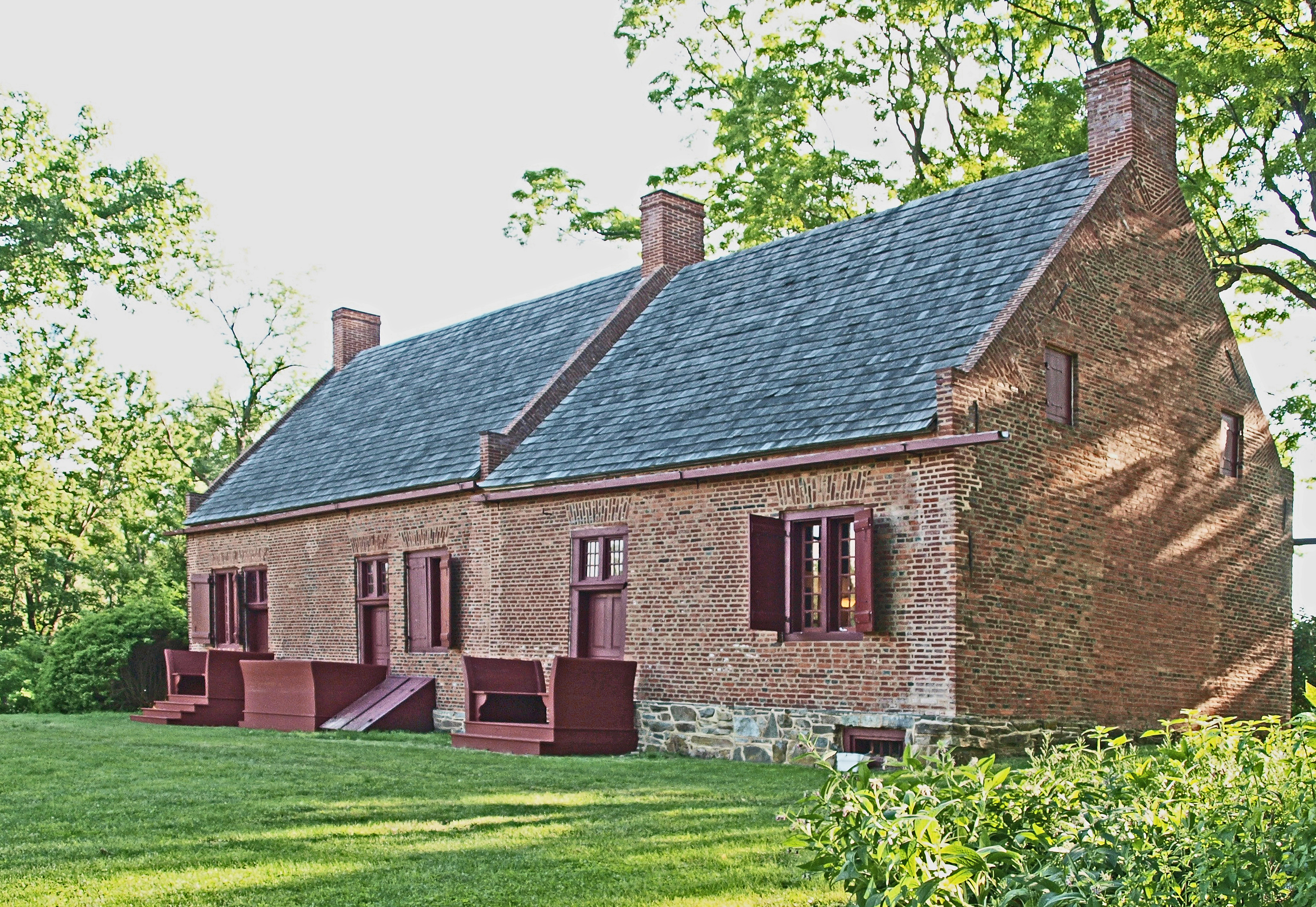
- 1737 Luykas Van Alen House

- Location within New York Location within the United States
- Interactive map showing the location of Van Alen House
- Location: 2589 NY 9H, Kinderhook, NY
- Coordinates: 42°22′51.94″N 73°41′29.10″W
- Area: 33 acres (13 ha)
- Built: c. 1737
- Built by: Luykas Van Alen
- Architectural style: Dutch Colonial
- NRHP reference No.: 67000011

Significant dates
- Added to NRHP: December 24, 1967
- Designated NHL: December 24, 1967

The Luykas Van Alen House is a historic Dutch Colonial farmhouse at 2589 New York State Route 9H in the town of Kinderhook, Columbia County, New York, United States. Built about 1737 and enlarged about 1750, it is one of the finest surviving examples of Dutch colonial architecture in upstate New York. It was designated a National Historic Landmark in 1967. It is now a historic house museum operated by the Columbia County Historical Society, and open for tours on weekends from June to October.

== Description and history ==
The Van Alen House is located in a rural setting of the upper Hudson River valley, on the west side New York 9H, about 2 miles (3.2 km) south of its junction with U.S. Route 9. It is a 1 1/2-story brick structure, with a steeply pitched gabled roof. It has three chimneys, one at each gable end, and one between two of the three rooms that make up the ground floor. The brick is laid in a typical Dutch style, with the gables also finished in brick. The gable lines differ from typical urban Dutch architecture of the period by being straight lines, rather than stepped or curved. The house's three rooms each have separate entrances, with reproduction sash windows beside them. The interior retains a number of features original to its construction or later alteration, but some features (notably the staircase) have been brought in from similar period houses.

The house was built about 1737 by Luykas Van Alen, who purchased the land from Mohican Native Americans. As built then, it was just two rooms, with no internal connection between them, and a sleeping loft above. The third room was added about 1750. The house remained in the hands of the Van Alen family until 1961, undergoing numerous alterations before falling into disrepair. It was given by them to the Columbia County Historical Society, which undertook a complete restoration. It is now operated by the Historical Society as a historic house museum illustrating 18th century Dutch Colonial life.

The Van Alen House and its farm are believed to have served as the inspiration for homestead of the Van Tassel family in Washington Irving's short story "The Legend of Sleepy Hollow". Irving established a decades-long close friendship with Jesse Merwin, a teacher of a nearby school, and was a close friend of Kinderhook native (and U.S. President) Martin Van Buren, a neighbor of the Van Alens and a frequent guest in the town.

This property (interior and exterior) was a location scene in the 1993 Martin Scorsese film The Age of Innocence, starring Michelle Pfeiffer and Daniel Day-Lewis.

== See also ==
- Van Allen House, another old house with similar family name in Oakland, New Jersey, near which were several other branches of the Van Alen or Van Allen family
- John Evert Van Alen House, another house of the same family in Defreestville, New York, near Albany
- List of National Historic Landmarks in New York
- National Register of Historic Places listings in Columbia County, New York
