= Ichabod Crane Schoolhouse =

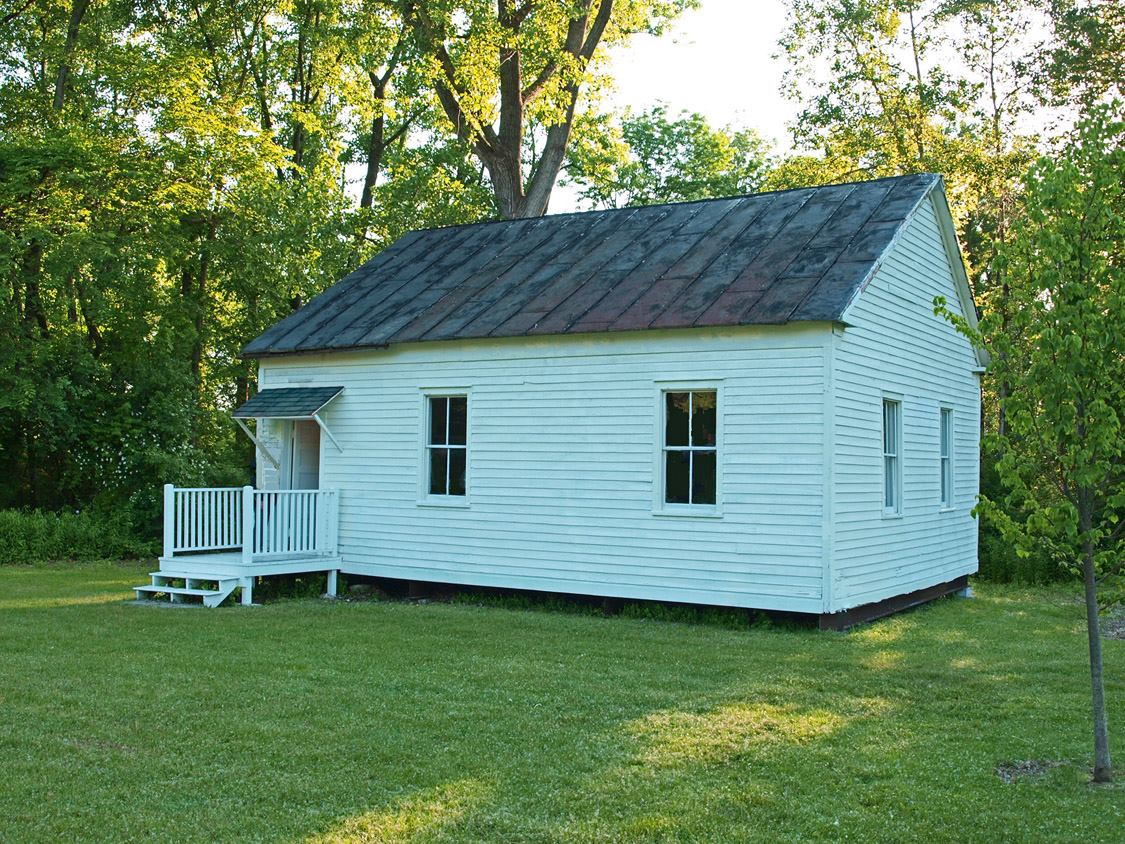
- 1850 Ichabod Crane Schoolhouse

- Location within New York Location within the United States
- 42°22′51.94″N 73°41′29.10″W
- Location: Kinderhook, NY
- Nearest city: Hudson

History
- Built: c.1850

Site notes
- Architectural styles: Colonial, Dutch
- Governing body: Columbia County Historical Society

The Ichabod Crane Schoolhouse is an historic wooden one-room schoolhouse built in approximately 1850 in the Hudson River valley. Located on NY 9H, about 1 mile (1.6 km) south of Kinderhook village in Columbia County, New York and 2 miles (3.2 km) south of US 9, the schoolhouse is named after author Washington Irving's fictional character, Ichabod Crane in The Legend of Sleepy Hollow.

The "Ichabod Crane Schoolhouse" is located on the larger estate property of the Luykas Van Alen House, whose structure and farm are believed to have served as inspiration for the Van Tassel family homestead in Washington Irving's short story The Legend of Sleepy Hollow. Irving was a close friend of Kinderhook native (and U.S. president) Martin Van Buren, a neighbor of the "Van Alen House" and a frequent guest in the town. The house is currently operated by the Columbia County Historical Society as an historic house museum presenting 18th century Dutch Colonial life.

== See also ==
- Luykas Van Alen House also on the same rural property in Columbia County, New York.
