= Ichabod Crane Central School District =

School district in New York, United States

Kinderhook (Ichabod Crane) Central School District is located in between the Catskill and Berkshire mountains and serves a population of 8,296 residents in northern Columbia and southern Rensselaer counties in New York. The district is in a rural setting 26 miles southeast of New York's capital, Albany, 15 miles (24 km) northeast of Hudson, and 120 miles north of New York City. The Ichabod Crane Central School District was formed in 1954, incorporating seven community schools into one centralized district. Currently there are three buildings, down from five after in 2012 the district closed down the elementary school of Martin H. Glynn and Martin Van Buren, the latter named after Van Buren, who made his home in Kinderhook, served as a New York state attorney general, vice president under Andrew Jackson, and as the eighth president of the United States. Glynn, raised in the village of Valatie, served as a U.S. representative, as well as the governor of New York from 1913 to 1915.

Ichabod Crane High School, located on U.S. Route 9 in the Town of Kinderhook, currently serves approximately 530 students in grades 9 - 12. Ichabod Crane Middle School houses approximately 680 students in grades 4 - 8. Ichabod Crane Primary School currently serves approximately 520 students in grades K-3. The Ichabod Crane Campus now serves all grades K-12.

Kinderhook's original two elementary schools, Martin Van Buren (in the village of Kinderhook) and Martin H. Glynn (in the village of Valatie) have been deaccessioned by the school district: The Martin Van Buren School is now Jack Shainman Gallery | The School, and the Martin H. Glynn School is now the Town Hall of Kinderhook and the Village Hall of Valatie.

The total district enrollment is approximately 1700 students with a professional staff of 220 and support staff of 140.

== In popular culture ==
Washington Irving lived in the Village of Kinderhook in 1809, where he wrote the satire, 'A History of New York'. Later, he wrote the short stories Rip Van Winkle and The Legend of Sleepy Hollow which take place regionally. The Kinderhook school district is named "Ichabod Crane". for the Irving character, Ichabod Crane, which was based on the original Kinderhook schoolmaster named Jesse Merwin. Irving and Merwin became friends in Kinderhook, where they boarded together at the Van Ness home, and the two friends continued a pen-pal correspondence for thirty years. The Columbia County Historical Society (New York) owns the original Kinderhook Schoolhouse named after the Irving character based on Merwin, the town's first schoolteacher.
