= Jonathan Kruk =

New York-based storyteller

Jonathan Kruk is a storyteller known for solo performances of Washington Irving's The Legend of Sleepy Hollow and Charles Dickens' A Christmas Carol in New York's Hudson Valley. He gives arts in education programs at schools, featuring Finger Fables, Fairy Tales, Medieval times, mythology, saint stories, the American Revolution, and Hudson River Lore.

== Early life and education ==
Kruk is the son of an army officer, Lieutenant Colonel John S. Kruk and a school teacher, Alicia Nowicki Kruk. Jonathan was born in El Paso,Texas and raised in Westchester County, New York.

He graduated from John Jay High School in Cross River, New York. Kruk received a degree in English from the College of the Holy Cross in Worcester, Massachusetts in 1977. He earned a master's degree in educational theater from New York University in 1982. He studied creative drama at Bretton Hall College, West Yorkshire, England. Kruk is an Eagle Scout.

== Career ==
Kruk began performing professionally in the early 1980s in Abingdon Square Park in New York City. During this period, he also performed with Gabrielle Roth and the Mirrors, and also watered indoor plants for ESPN, Fujitsu and Henry Kissinger.

=== Educational storyteller ===
==== Halloween ====
Eventally, Kruk created a career in educational storytelling. In the lead-up to Halloween, Kruk regularly performs an adaptation of Washington Irving's The Legend of Sleepy Hollow at Washington Irving's Homestead, Sunnyside and from 2010 to 2021 at the Old Dutch Church of Sleepy Hollow. He has also performed The Legend of Sleepy Hollow at libraries and regional theaters like The Opera House in Havre de Grace, Maryland. Annually, he performs the solo show more than fifty times.

In 2020 Historic Hudson Valley produced with Guido Jiménez-Cruz, a short film The Misadventures of Ichabod Crane featuring Kruk as a "narrator... pleasant, shabby, gentlemanly..." returning to the Old Dutch Church to retell the Yankee Schoolmaster's lovelorn story.

==== Christmas ====
In the weeks before Christmas, he performs a solo show of Charles Dickens' A Christmas Carol at the Old Dutch Church in Sleepy Hollow. He has also performed at local schools and other locations such as the Harness Racing Museum & Hall of Fame in Goshen, New York, the Greenwich Library, Connecticut, the Easton Congregational Church, the UCPAC Hamilton Stage, Rahway, NJ and the Music Theater of Connecticut.

==== Other work ====
Since 2021, he has served as the storyteller-in-residence for the Roman Catholic Archdiocese of New York.

In 2026, he recited the United States Declaration of Independence for the City of White Plains, as well in East Fishkill, Rhinebeck, Port Chester and Tuckahoe, New York.

In 2026, he was involved in events to celebrate the United States Semiquincentennial.

=== Writing ===
- Legends and Lore of Sleepy Hollow and the Hudson Valley (2011)
- Legends and Lore of the Hudson Highlands (2018)
- The Magical, Wonderful Bul Bul Bird (2025)

== In media ==
Kruk appeared on CBS Sunday Morning in 2012. He also appeared on The Today Show, the Travel Channel, the BBC and NPR.

== Personal life ==
Kruk has a collection of bricks from various spots in the Hudson Valley.
