= John Evert Van Alen =

American politician (1749–1807)

Member of the U.S. House of Representatives from New York's 7th district
- In office March 4, 1793 – March 3, 1799
- Preceded by: District created
- Succeeded by: John C. Brodhead

Personal details
- Born: 1749 Kinderhook, Province of New York, British America
- Died: February 27, 1807 (aged 57–58) Defreestville, New York, U.S.
- Resting place: Bloomington Rural Cemetery; North Greenbush, New York
- Citizenship: US
- Party: Federalist
- Spouse: Anne Freyermoet Van Alen
- Children: Evert Van Alen
- Profession: surveyor, merchant, politician

John Evert Van Alen (1749 – February 27, 1807) was an American surveyor, merchant, and politician from the U.S. state of New York. He served as a Federalist member of the United States House of Representatives.

== Early life ==
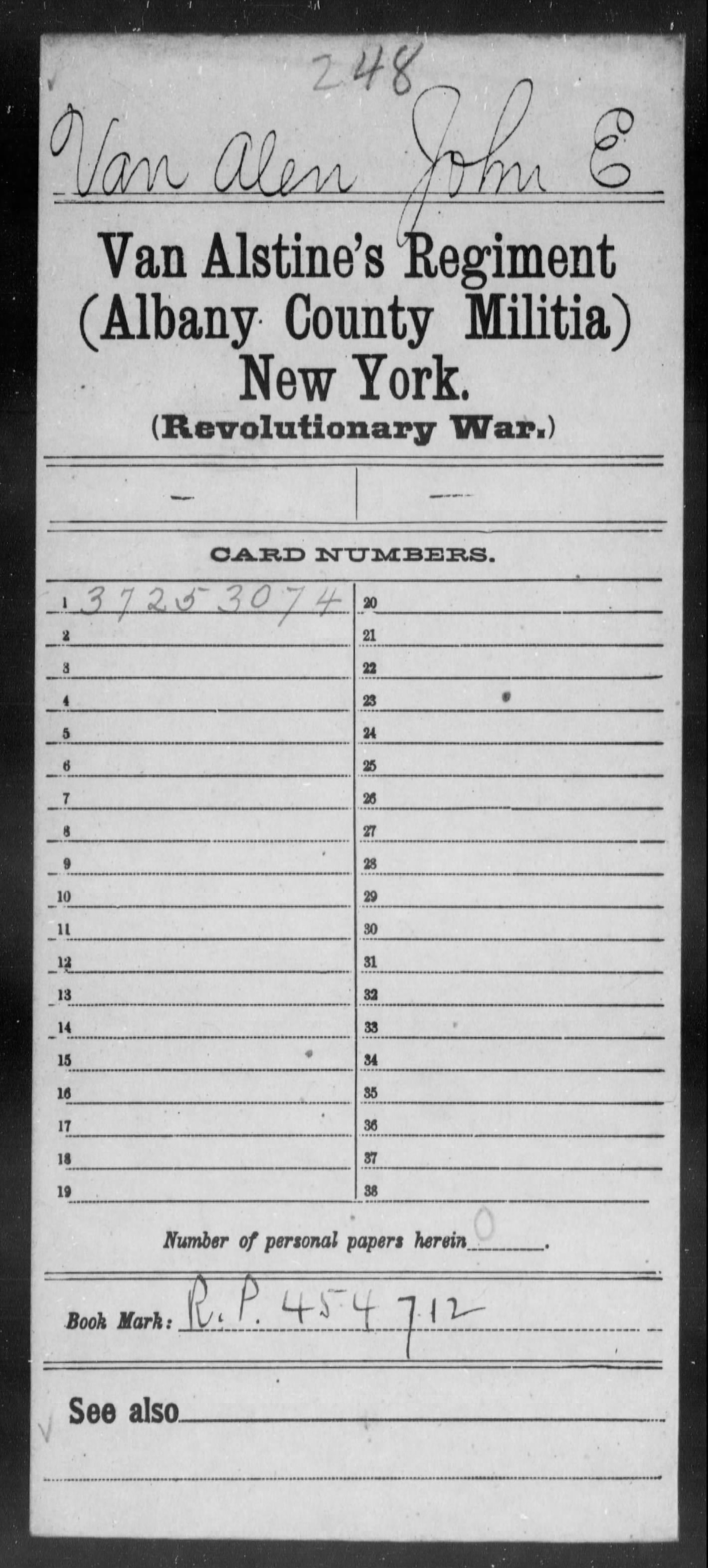
Revolutionary War service record for John Evert Van Alen (1749-1807).

Van Alen was born in Kinderhook in the Province of New York, the son of Adam and Mary Van Alen. After completing his studies he became a farmer.

He moved to Defreestville and continued to farm, also serving in local offices including justice of the peace. He also became involved in civil engineering and surveying.

During the American Revolution he served as a private in the 7th Regiment (Abraham Van Alstyne's) of the Albany County Militia.

In 1790, he surveyed the town of Greenbush where he later operated a general store.

== Political career ==
He held various political office in New York, and was assistant judge for Rensselaer County in 1791. He was elected from New York's newly created 7th congressional district in 1793 and was reelected twice, serving in Congress from March 4, 1793 to March 3, 1799. He then served as a member of the New York State Assembly in 1800 and 1801.

== Death and legacy ==
Van Alen died in Defreestville on February 27, 1807, and is interred in Bloomingrove Rural Cemetery in North Greenbush, New York. Van Alen owned slaves. According to the terms of his 1793 will, he bequeathed to his wife "my negro girl named Dinah." To his nephew Evert Van Alen, he bequeathed "my negro boy named Tom." In addition, Van Alen provided for the manumission of "my negro man named Gus, and my negro woman named Mol" immediately after the remarriage of his wife or his wife's death, whichever came first.

The John Evert Van Alen House, constructed while he was sitting in Congress at Philadelphia, is extant in Defreestville, and was listed on the National Register of Historic Places in 2004.

== Family life ==
Van Alen married Anne Freyenmoet in 1771. They had one child, Evert, a nephew whom they adopted.

U.S. House of Representatives
New district	Member of the U.S. House of Representatives from New York's 7th congressional district 1793–1799	Succeeded by John Thompson
