= Samuel Youngs =

American politician

Samuel Youngs (December 4, 1760 – September 12, 1839) was an American school teacher. He was a friend of Washington Irving and elements of his life may be included in the character Ichabod Crane in Irving's story The Legend of Sleepy Hollow, along with the character inspiration from Kinderhook Schoolteacher, Jesse Merwin.

He served as a lieutenant in the American Revolutionary War, and was honored, along with other residents of the Tarrytown area who fought in that war, with a monument erected in Sleepy Hollow Cemetery. He was a Federalist member of the New York State Assembly in 1796–97, 1809 and 1810; and Surrogate of Westchester County. He was interred in the Burying Ground of the Old Dutch Church of Sleepy Hollow in Sleepy Hollow, New York. In 1851 Youngs' remains were removed to the Dale Cemetery in Ossining, New York, becoming the first interment at that cemetery.
