= Eastwood Lane =

American composer (1879–1951)

- Picture from the collection of Syracuse University

Background information
- Born: May 22, 1879; Brewerton, New York
- Died: January 22, 1951 (aged 71)
- Genres: Art Deco
- Occupation: Composer

Eastwood Lane (May 22, 1879 – January 22, 1951) was an American composer who wrote piano suites and ballet music. His compositions influenced Bix Beiderbecke.

Eastwood Lane was born in Brewerton, New York.

== Compositions for piano ==
- The suite In Sleepy Hollow (1913), containing the pieces
  - In Sleepy Hollow
  - On Tappan Zee (A Boat Song)
  - Mid-October Afternoon (Reverie)
  - Katrina's Waltz
- Five American Dances (1919)
- Adirondack Sketches (1922), containing the following pieces. Descriptions are from the original sheet music.
  - The Old Guide's Story: "Adirondack Guides are proverbially reticent, but theirs is an eloquent silence. At the end of a hard day's fishing or hunting when pipes are lit, and sparks from the campfire dart aloft, circling, through the spruce tops like a myriad of fireflies, this silence, if one is patient, will be broken by marvelous tales of adventure in the Big Woods."
  - The Legend of Lonesome Lake: "Deep and dark, with its mirror surface reflecting the conifers on its precipitous shores, Lonesome Lake seems appropriately named. The story goes that a woman who was camping nearby mistaking the cry of a loon for that of a child in distress, followed it through the darkness and plunged over a cliff to death in the lake."
  - Down Stream: "Depicting a little Adirondack stream — now rippling over the shallows, now broadening into deeper, quieter pools, wherein is reflected a moon of carnival immensity, lurking behind the inverted hemlock tops."
  - The Land of the Loon (A Camp-Fire Story): "All lovers of the Adirondacks will recall their first impression of this beautiful bird, its eerie, mournful cry and almost insane laughter. The Indians and the guides regard the loon with superstitious awe; they believe that to injure or kill one means certain misfortune, and many are the stories told of the evil which befell those who were rash enough to harm one."
  - A Dirge for Jo Indian: "Jo Indian was a famous Adirondack Indian who lived and hunted in the vicinity of the mountain bearing his name. Like Chingachgook, Cooper's marvelous embodiment of all that is best in the native North American, Jo Indian met his death in a forest fire."
  - Lumber-Jack Dance: "After a supper in the cook's shack such as Paul Bunion, that mythical but mighty figure of Lumber-Jack lore, might have eaten, Pierre tunes up his fiddle. His swaying body and time-thumping boot are irresistible, and soon forgetting the intense cold and toil of the long day, each hardy woodman is pounding the rough floor with his spiked boots suiting his steps and capers of his personal taste and intense need of rhythmical gratification."
- Mongoliana (1922)
- Eastern Seas (1925)
- Sold Down the River (1928)
- Pantomimes (1933)
- Fourth of July (1935)
- Here Are Ladies (1944)
- Jesuit's Journey (1947)
- Central Park
- Colonial Suite
- Flower of Old Japan
- Knee-High to a Grasshopper

Three of his pieces, "Sea Burial", "Persimmon Pucker", and "Minuet for Betty Schuyler", were arranged by Ferde Grofe for the orchestra of Paul Whiteman.

== Publications ==
- Norman P. Gentieu, "Eastwood Lane", Journal of Jazz Studies, Spring 1976, Vol. 3, No. 2, pp. 58–84.
