= The Legend of Sleepy Hollow (1980 film) =

- Release poster
- Genre: Comedy; Fantasy; Horror
- Based on: "The Legend of Sleepy Hollow" by Washington Irving
- Written by: Malvin Wald; Jack Jacobs; Thomas C. Chapman
- Directed by: Henning Schellerup
- Starring: Jeff Goldblum; Meg Foster; Dick Butkus; Paul Sand; Laura Campbell; James Griffith; Michael Ruud; Karin Isaacson; H.E.D. Redford; Tiger Thompson; John Sylvester White; Michael Witt; Marneen Fields
- Music by: Bob Summers
- Country of origin: United States
- Original language: English

Production
- Executive producer: Charles Sellier
- Producer: James L. Conway
- Cinematography: Paul Hipp
- Editor: Michael Spence
- Running time: 104 minutes
- Production companies: Schick Sunn Classics; Sunn Classic Pictures

Original release
- Network: NBC
- Release: October 31, 1980

The Legend of Sleepy Hollow is a 1980 American made-for-television film produced by Sunn Classic Pictures as a part of their Classics Illustrated series. It was filmed partly in Park City, Utah, and shown on NBC. It starred Jeff Goldblum as Ichabod Crane, Meg Foster as Katrina von Tassel, and Dick Butkus as Brom Bones. It was directed by Henning Schellerup and produced by Charles Sellier, who was nominated for an Emmy Award for his work on the film.

The plot follows the general outline of the 1820 Washington Irving short story "The Legend of Sleepy Hollow", with the addition of a new character, widow Thelma Dumkey, who marries Brom Bones, leaving Ichabod free to marry Katrina.

== Cast ==
- Jeff Goldblum as Ichabod Crane
- Paul Sand as Frederic Dutcher
- Meg Foster as Katrina Van Tassel
- Laura Campbell as Thelma Dumkey
- Dick Butkus as Brom Bones
- James Griffith as Squire Van Tassel
- Michael Ruud as Winthrop Palmer
- H.E.D. Redford as Coral
- Tiger Thompson as Ted Dumkey
- John Sylvester White as Fritz Vanderhoof
- Michael Witt as Jan Van Tassel
- Marneen Fields as Singer #1 (uncredited)

== See also ==
- List of films set around Halloween
