= Jesse Merwin =

American school teacher (1783–1852)

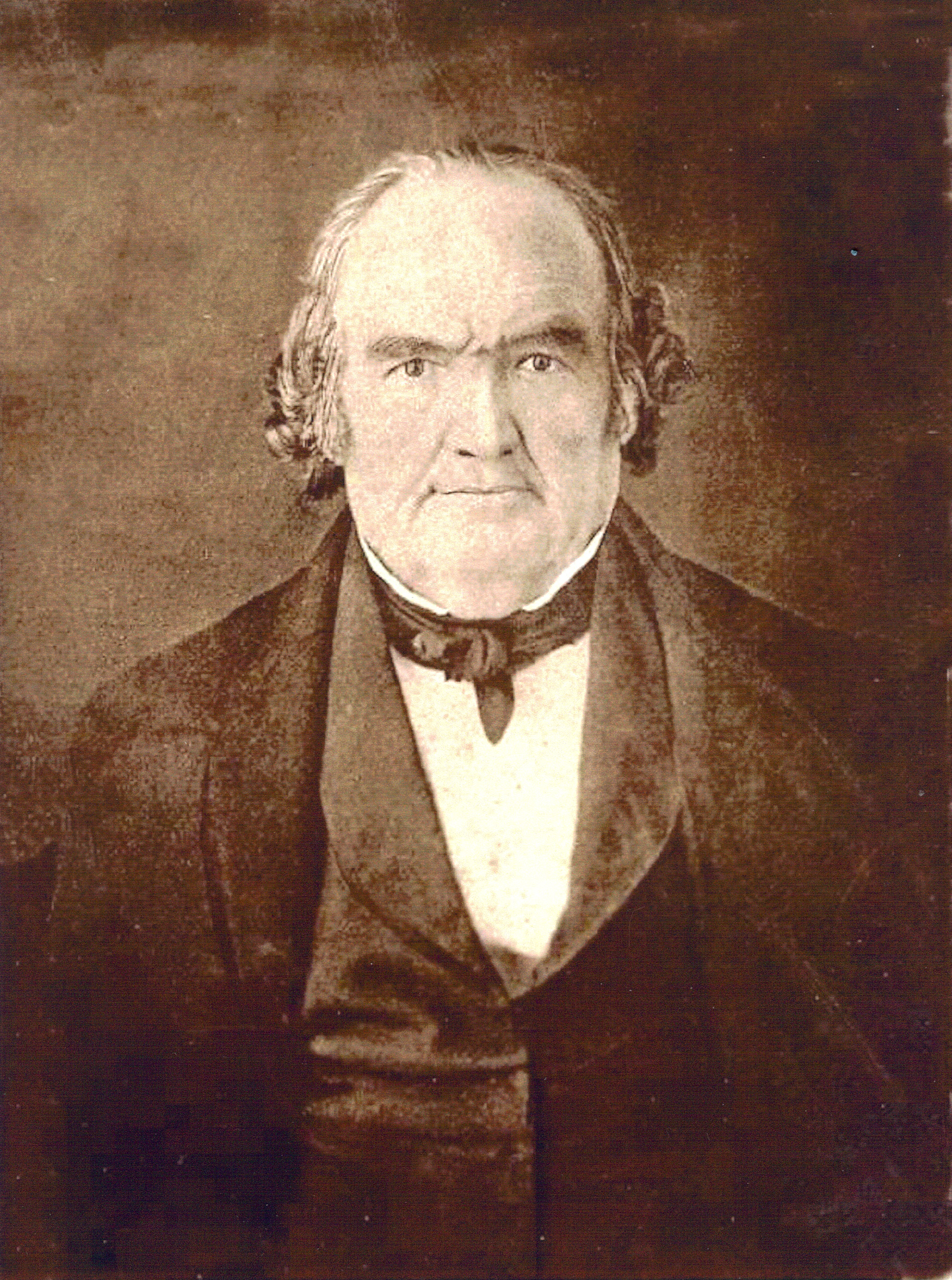
- Jesse Merwin; From an old photograph, first printed in Collier's 'A history of old Kinderhook from aboriginal days to the present time' (1914)
- Born: April 3, 1783; Milford, Connecticut
- Died: November 8, 1852 (aged 68); Kinderhook (town), New York
- Occupations: Schoolmaster, Attorney, Farmer

Jesse Merwin (April 3, 1783 – November 8, 1852), called the "pattern" or "original" of Ichabod Crane, was a rural schoolmaster in Upstate New York, and a friend of Martin Van Buren and Washington Irving. He taught school at a single-room schoolhouse in Columbia County, New York.

== Biography ==
Jesse Merwin, a 19th-century schoolmaster in Kinderhook, New York, was described in a well-known longhand script letter by President Martin Van Buren as the "pattern" for author Washington Irving's character of Ichabod Crane in his story "The Legend of Sleepy Hollow".

According to a notation by Irving and a certification written in longhand by Martin Van Buren—who was friends with both the author and the schoolteacher—the 'pattern' (Van Buren's words) for the character of Ichabod Crane was a Kinderhook schoolmaster named Jesse Merwin, whom Irving became friends with in Kinderhook, New York, in 1809.

By 1809, Merwin was teaching at a District School in Kinderhook, where he boarded at the home of Judge William Peter Van Ness. At the Van Ness Mansion (which would later be bought by Martin Van Buren), he met another boarder, a twenty-six year old tutor and aspiring author named Washington Irving. Irving and Merwin went fishing and hunting together during that period and became lifelong friends.

Merwin and Irving continued a pen-pal correspondence for thirty years. The Columbia County Historical Society (New York) owns the original Kinderhook Schoolhouse named after the Irving character based on Jesse Merwin, the town's first schoolteacher. The Kinderhook town school district (Ichabod Crane Central School District) is also named for the Irving character.

However, because a member of the Van Tassel family was a lieutenant alongside another man in Tarrytown, Samuel Youngs, according to an 1894 article in The New York Times, "it [was] claimed by many in that town (Tarrytown) that Samuel Youngs was the original from whom Irving drew his character of Ichabod Crane". Author Gary Denis asserts that while the character of Ichabod Crane is loosely based on Kinderhook Schoolmaster, Jesse Merwin, it may possibly... include elements from Samuel Youngs' life.

Stanley Thomas Williams, Professor of English at Yale University, an early Irving biographer best known for his interpretation of Herman Melville as well as his two-volume biography on Irving, also refers to Martin Van Buren's certificate, stating in his two-volume work on Irving, "...Ichabod Crane, Irving drew from the schoolmaster whom he knew in 1809."

== Personal life ==
Merwin married Jane Van Dyke, the daughter of a wealthy Kinderhook farmer in 1808, and together they had eight sons and three daughters. In 1834, Merwin named one of his sons Washington Irving Merwin after his friend the author. Merwin died in Kinderhook on November 8, 1852.
