= John Evert Van Alen House =

Historic house in New York, United States

- U.S. National Register of Historic Places
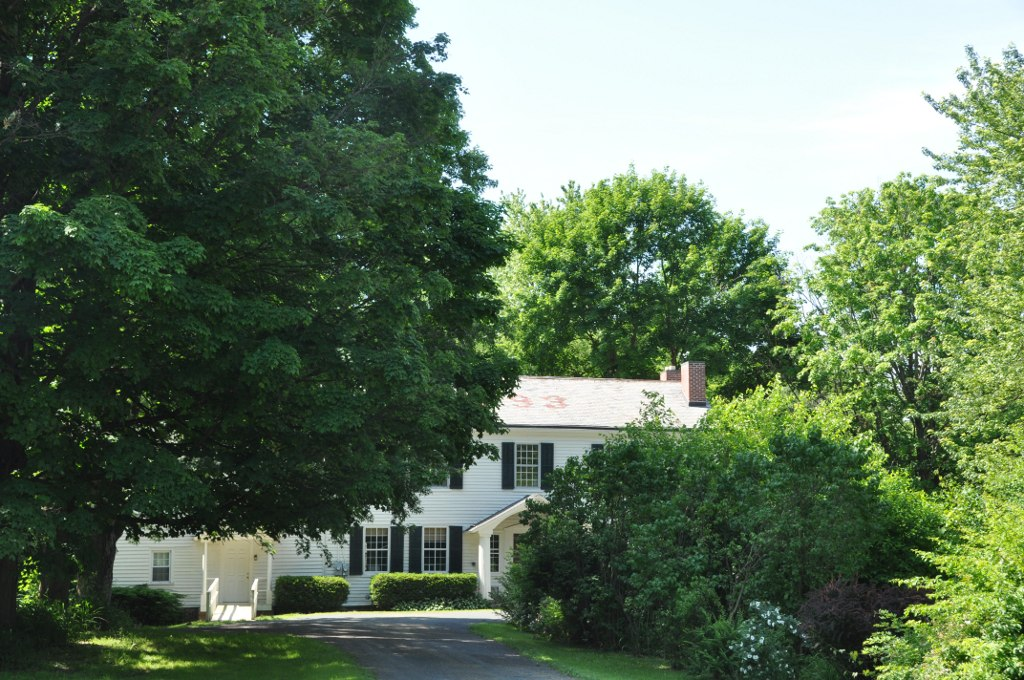

- Location within New York Location within the United States
- Location: 1744 Washington Ave. Ext., Defreestville, New York
- Coordinates: 42°39′11″N 73°41′56″W
- Area: 3.6 acres (1.5 ha)
- Built: 1793
- Architectural style: Federal
- NRHP reference No.: 04000873
- Added to NRHP: August 20, 2004

John Evert Van Alen House is a historic home located at Defreestville in Rensselaer County, New York. The house was built between 1793 and 1794 and is a two-story, five-bay wide, room and a half deep, frame dwelling with a two-story, three-bay wide addition in the Federal style. The addition dates to about 1840–1854. It is sheathed in clapboards and is topped by a gable roof. Also on the property is a contributing L-shaped barn and the Van Alen family burial ground. The original owner John Evert Van Alen served in the U.S. House of Representatives from 1793 to 1799.

It was listed on the National Register of Historic Places in 2004.
