= Gary Denniss =

Canadian historian, newspaper columnist, teacher and minister (born 1944)

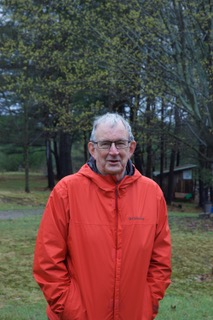
- Gary Denniss, 2017
- Born: May 31, 1944 (age 82); Bracebridge, Ontario; Canada
- Education: Wilfrid Laurier University (Bachelor's degree 1965); North Bay Teacher's College (Teacher's Certificate, 1965) York St. Peter's Evangelistic Organization (Ordained Minister 2016)
- Occupations: Canadian historian, elementary school teacher, columnist, ordained minister, speaker, antiquarian
- Years active: 1965 -
- Spouse: Grace Audrey Reuber (m. 1972)
- Children: Deborah Ruth Woodland (b. 1976); Londa Carol Balfoort (1977–2004); Steven Garfield Denniss (b. 1978)

Frank Garfield "Gary" Denniss is a Canadian historian, newspaper columnist, retired public school teacher, speaker and ordained minister born in 1944 in Bracebridge, Ontario Denniss is the author of 46 books on the history of the District Municipality of Muskoka, (Muskoka District, at the southern edge of the Canadian Shield, stretches north from the Severn River through rocky and forested lake land, bounded by Georgian Bay on the west and Algonquin Park to the east, connecting to twin district Parry Sound.)

== Biography ==
Gary Denniss was born at Bracebridge Memorial Hospital on May 31, 1944, to Frank Edwin Denniss II (1908–2003), and Jessie Evelyn Arnott (1917–1991). Mr Denniss taught in the public schools in the Bracebridge, Ontario area (Wah Wah Taysee, Cochrane, Bracebridge, Vankoughnet, Huntsville, and Macaulay) until his retirement in 1998. He continues to live in Bracebridge, where he writes, teaches piano, and officiates at weddings and funerals. Since 1991, Mr Denniss has held a leadership role in the maintenance of Bracebridge veterans' gravesites, veterans' memories and Langford Cemetery, Macaulay Township.

== Published works ==
- "Macaulay Township in Days Gone By" : Herald-Gazette Press, 1970, (Algoma University, Wishart Library).
- "The Pioneer Zimmerman Family of Macaulay Township", newspaper article, Herald-Gazette, Bracebridge, ON. April 2, 1970.
- "A Brief History of the Schools in Muskoka", Herald-Gazette Press, 1972.
- "Free Methodist Hill, a Centennial History", 1879–1979, Herald-Gazette, 1979.
- "The Spirit of the Twelfth (1982); The story of the Orange Order in Canada", Gravenhurst Printing, 1982
- "Muskoka - Ontario’s First District Municipality", 1995, GarDen Press.
- "A Brief History of the Churches in Muskoka", 1997, 1998 and 2003, Publisher: GarDen Press, 2003 (Algoma University, Wishart Library),
- "The Story of Springdale Park", Publisher: Springdale Park Spiritual Association, 1998. ISBN 0968413501, by Gary Denniss.
- "Educating Muskoka District", 1999, ISBN 0-9686224-2-9, by Gary Denniss.
- "The Educational Heritage of Muskoka", 2001 (History of the Muskoka Board of Education), ISBN 0-9686224-1-0.
- "The Past Before Us: A History of Free Methodist Camp Meetings in Muskoka, 2002, ISBN 0-9686224-2-9.
- "In Loving Memory: The History of Langford Cemetery", 2006 (collection of obituaries).
- "Going to School in Macaulay", 2010, ISBN 0-9813073-2-9 by Gary Denniss.
- "The Holditch Family Reunion", Sept. 2013, GarDen Press.
- "Historic Routes of Bracebridge", 2012, GarDen Press.
- "Bracebridge Connections", Vol. 1, 2014, GarDen Press.
- "Bracebridge Connections", Vol. 2, 2015, GarDen Press
- "Bracebridge in the Fifties", 2016, GarDen Press
- "Bracebridge in the Sixties", 2017, GarDen Press
- "Bracebridge in the Seventies", GarDen Press, February 2018, ISBN 978-0-9813073-5-0
- "Muskoka Scrapbook" (series of eight books: Individual years, 1926, 1936, 1946, 1956, 1966, 1976 (two volumes), 1952.
- "A Good Town Continues - Bracebridge 1915–1999", contributed to by Gary Denniss.
- "The Orange Lodge and its History in Muskoka", 1999.
- "Titch of Muskoka (a seven-part series)"
- "Muskoka Scrapbook - a five-part series of books on World War 1" -1914, 1915, 1916, 1917, 1918): Volume 1 ISBN 978-0-9686224-4-5, Volume 2 ISBN 978-0-9686224-6-9, Volume 3 ISBN 978-0-9686224-7-6, Volume 4 ISBN 978-0-9686224-9-0, Volume 5 ISBN 978-0-9813073-1-2 "Muskoka Scrapbook - Speaker Series", sponsored by Muskoka Steamship and Historical Society", First speaker, Gary Denniss, Sun., April 22, 2007.
- Bracebridge in the Eighties ISBN 978-0-9813073-6-7 December 2018, GarDen Press
- The Family Heritage of Howard and Sheila Vincent, ISBN 978-0-9813073-7-4, December 2018, GarDen Press
- "The Arnott's of 36 Edward Street", ISBN 978-0-9813073-8-1, June 2019. The Book Covers Muskoka's Rugged, Rich Past", Mark Clairmont, Muskoka Today
- "Langford Cemetery 1873-2023" ISBN 978-1-7770181-9-1
- "The Zimmerman Family Legacy" ISBN 978-1-7382111-2-8
- "The Denniss Family Legacy" ISBN 978-1-7382111-1-1
- "Muskoka Memories 101" November 2019, ISBN 978-0-9813073-9-8
- "Muskoka Memories 102" ISBN 978-0-9813073-9-8
- "Muskoka Memories 103" October 2021 ISBN 978-1-7770181-1-5
- "Muskoka Memories 104" ISBN 978-1-7770181-3-9
- "Muskoka Memories 105" ISBN 978-1-7770181-7-7
- "Muskoka Memories 106" ISBN 978-1-7770181-8-4
- "Muskoka Memories 107" ISBN 978-1-7382111-0-4
- "Muskoka Memories 108"ISBN 978-1-7382111-3-5
- "Muskoka Memories 109"ISBN 978-1-7382111-4-2
- "Muskoka Memories 110" ISBN 978-1-7382111-4-2

== Other Links ==
https://www.youtube.com/watch?v=srTeIAKzUCU

https://muskokatoday.com/2023/08/latest-gary-denniss-history-book-covers-muskokas-rugged-rich-past

== Reviews ==
- "Among local Historians, Gary Denniss is Royalty", by Ted Currie, Muskoka Today, Nov. 3–17 issue, 1995.

== Awards and honors ==
- Lieutenant Governor's Ontario Heritage Award for Lifetime Achievement, presented by Lt. Gov. David Onley, Feb. 21, 2013
- Heritage Community Recognition Award, presented to Mr. Denniss at the Rene Caisse Theatre, the Town of Bracebridge, by Councillor Steve Clement and C. Hammond, June 27, 2012
- Robert J. Boyer Award, "honours the dedication of individuals in our community who work to keep the natural and cultural history of our region alive", presented to Gary Denniss by the Board of Directors, Muskoka Conservancy, May 17, 2013.
