= Columbia County Historical Society =

The Columbia County Historical Society and CCHS Museum & Library (founded in 1916) collects, preserves, interprets, and presents the history, heritage, and culture of Columbia County, New York, and serves residents of all eighteen Columbia County towns and the city of Hudson.

CCHS collections include important and rare genealogical materials, archives, paintings, photographs, textiles, furniture and decorative arts relating to Columbia County's heritage.

The Columbia County Historical Society owns and maintains four historic properties including a museum & library at its headquarters located in the village of Kinderhook, New York at the corner of Broad Street and Albany Avenue. It also publishes an annual magazine, Columbia County History & Heritage.

== History ==
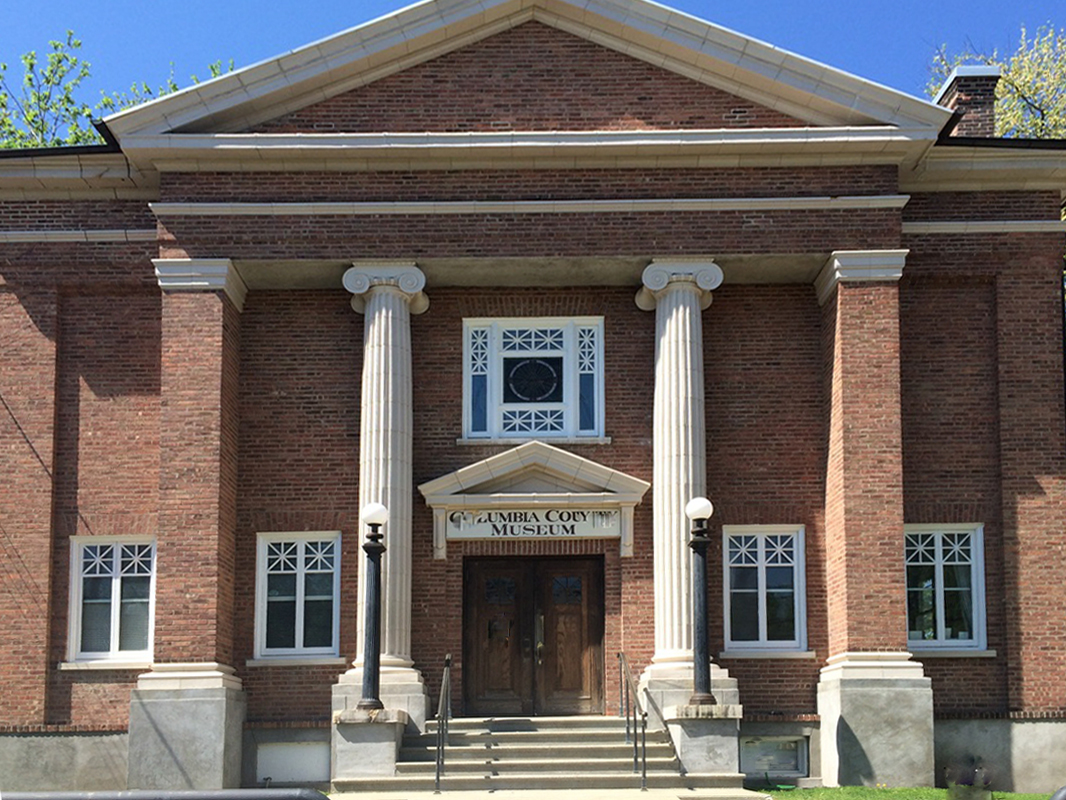
CCHS Museum & Library. Headquarters of the Columbia County Historical Society.

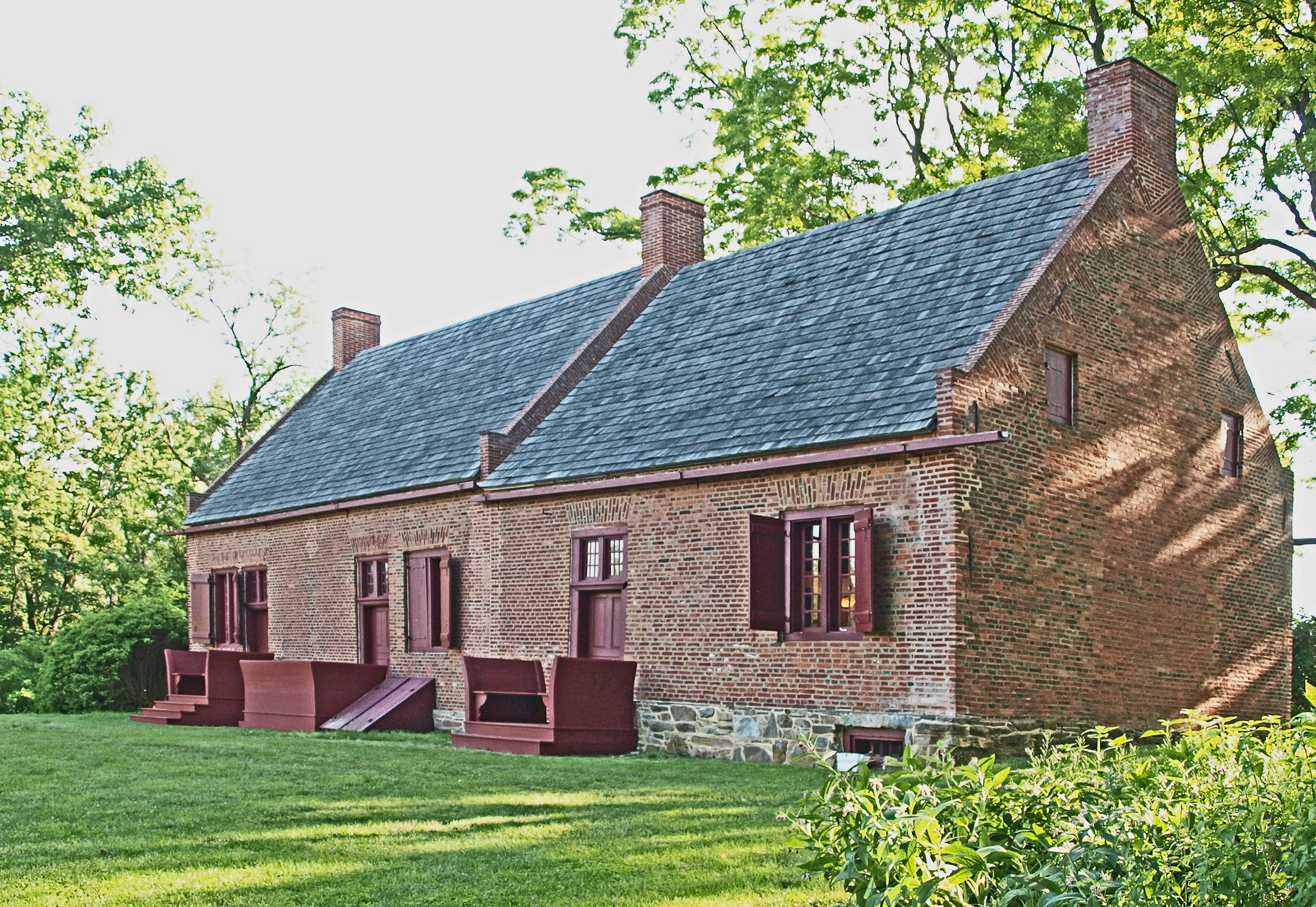
c.1737 Luykas Van Alen House, Kinderhook, New York. Collection of the Columbia County Historical Society, acquired in 1964.

The Columbia County Historical Society was founded in 1916 as a women' social and philanthropic club. The historical society first admitted men with a men's auxiliary in 1917 and became fully coed when it incorporated in 1924 as the Columbia County Historical Society, Inc. In 2016, the CCHS celebrated its centennial with publication of its institutional history and exhibition, "100 Years of Collecting". The Historical Society generally focuses on New York State and Dutch Colonial history and culture.

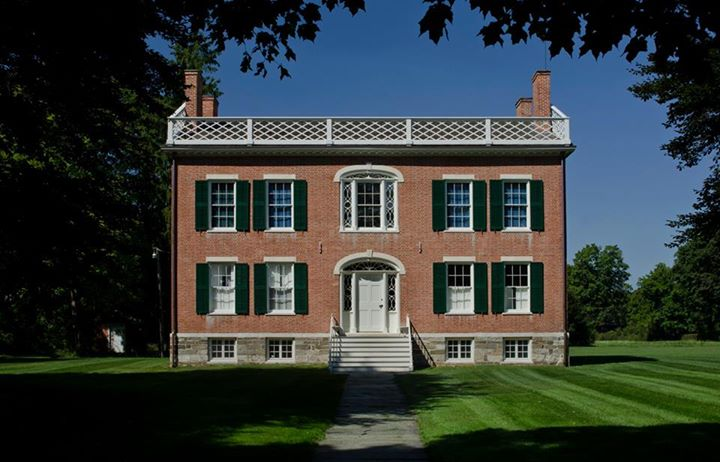
c.1820 James Vanderpoel 'House of History', Kinderhook, New York. Collection of the Columbia County Historical Society, acquired in 1924.

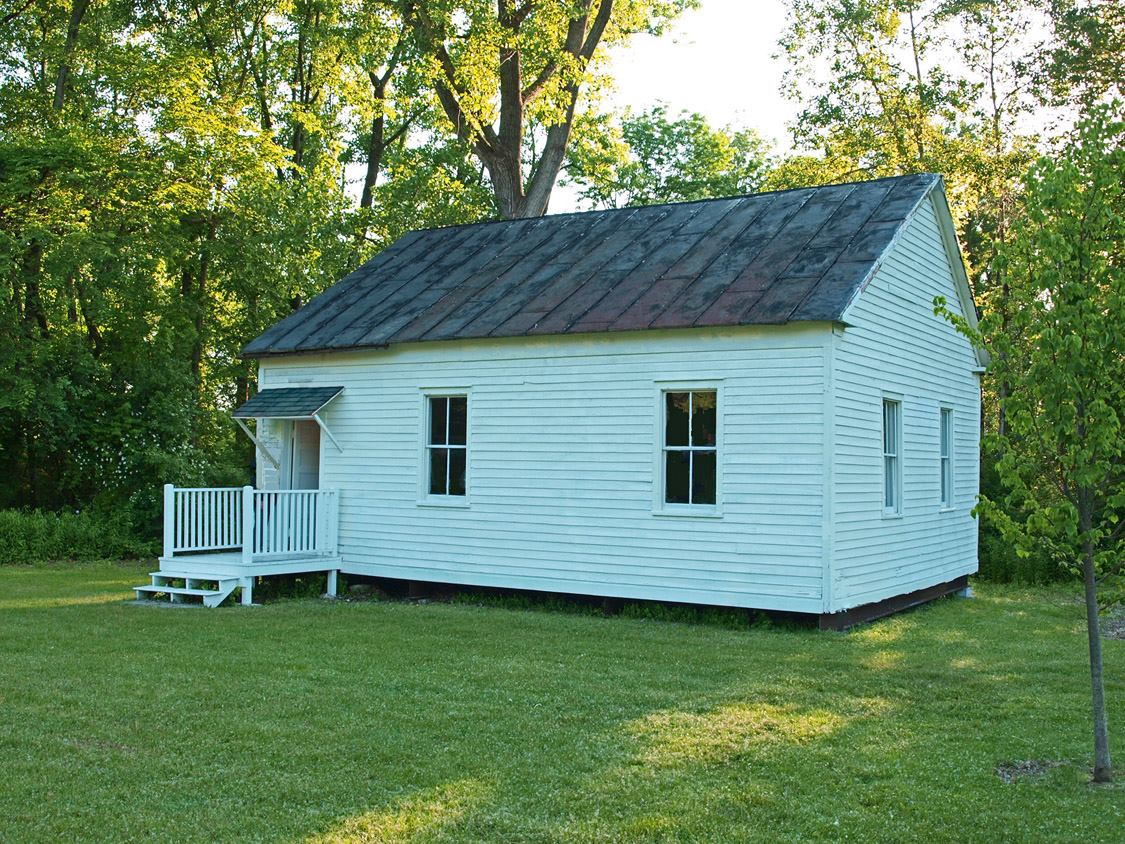
Ichabod Crane Schoolhouse

== Historic Properties ==
Columbia County Historical Society owns four historic properties:

- The National Historic Landmark c1737 Luykas Van Alen House
- c.1850 Ichabod Crane Schoolhouse
- c.1820 James Vanderpoel 'House of History'
- 1915 Museum & Library building (headquarters)

the Headquarters building houses the museum & library, collections storage exhibit galleries as well as staff offices

== Collections ==
CCHS collections include works of art, paintings, photographs, decorative arts, maps, furniture, textiles, costumes, books and rare manuscripts, as well as four historic properties: The 1737 National Historic Landmark, Dutch Colonial 'Luykas Van Alen House'; c.1820 James Vanderpoel House; c1850 Ichabod Crane Schoolhouse; and the 1915 CCHS Museum & Library building.

The Barbara P. Rielly Memorial Research Library (located within the headquarters building) is named for a former CCHS Board of Trustees President, and holds material on Columbia County and New York State history, genealogy, architecture, and decorative arts as well as manuscripts, books, maps, architectural drawings, diaries, personal correspondence, scrap books, broadsides, business records, pamphlets, programs, ephemera, photographic prints, glass and film negatives, cased images, and albums.

== Cultural Heritage Outdoor Narrative - Open Air Museum ==
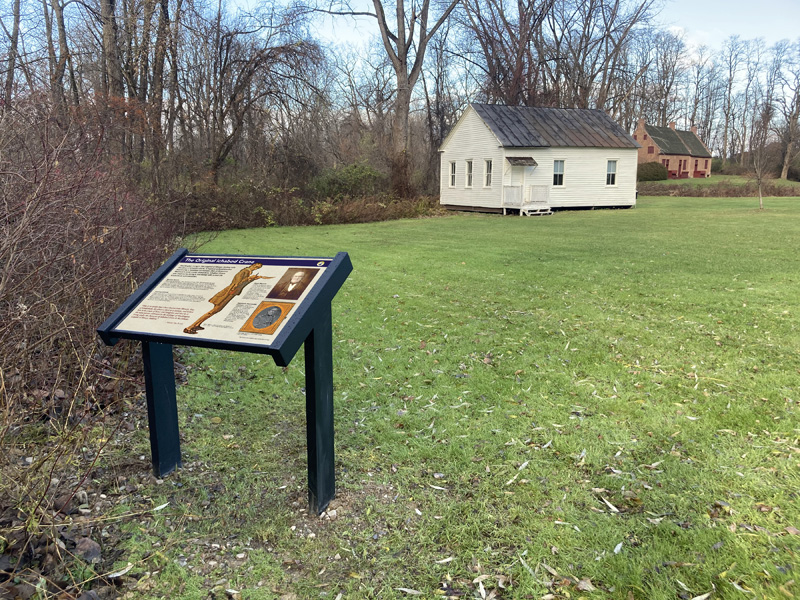
The Original Ichabod Crane - narrative panel

Nestled among the treeline of the contiguous rural properties on NY State Highway 9H - Ichabod Crane Schoolhouse and Luykas Van Alen House - is a permanent outdoor exhibition of Hudson Valley and Columbia County Cultural Heritage. This permanent outdoor exhibit interprets the history of northern Columbia County, and consists of nine narrative panels placed throughout the CCHS fifty-acre Rural Properties site. On view are the stories of the people who lived, worked, created, and learned in the County from the 17th through the 20th centuries. Narrative panel subjects include: Mohicans|Native Inhabitants; The Van Alen Family & Early Dutch Settlers; Enslavement in the Hudson Valley; Colonial Dutch Architecture; Black Locust Trees; Washington Irving; The Original Ichabod Crane; One-Room Schoolhouses; Eleanor Roosevelt at Ichabod Crane Schoolhouse. Location: 2589 NY-9H, Kinderhook, NY 12037

== Headquarters ==
The CCHS Museum & Library building was constructed in 1915 by the Kinderhook Chapter of the Royal Arch Masons as their temple. During the 1970s the building was sold to the local chapter of the Elks Club to serve as their Kinderhook Lodge. The Elks moved to their present location on NY-9H in Kinderhook during the late 1980s and the building was sold again to the CCHS, who reinvented the structure as their headquarters, with the CCHS Research Library on the main floor along with a small gallery, manuscript storage and offices; and large gallery space on the second floor with executive offices and collections storage.

== Overview ==
The Columbia County Historical Society New York, is the largest historic organization in Columbia County, New York and is one of the largest in the Hudson Valley | Capital District region, as well as a cultural anchor in the County. CCHS presents exhibitions, public and educational programming, and offers a research library open to the public with regular hours. The CCHS holds an extensive collection of NYS historical artifacts, portraits and works of art—primarily of the Hudson Valley—and other materials documenting the history of Columbia County and New York State. It presents exhibitions on a variety of topics related to the history, heritage and culture of Columbia County, such as early Dutch Settlers, Native American and African-American settlers, Hudson River School painters, Hudson Valley portraiture, New York-made furniture, Columbia County historical costumes and textiles, and local history events.

Each year, the Historical Society provides tours of the Ichabod Crane Schoolhouse and Luykas Van Alen House to fourth graders throughout Columbia County, and also offers several curriculum-based school programs and teacher resources, and organizes ongoing lecture series and events for adults to foster a deep appreciation of New York and Columbia County history and culture.

== See also ==
- Columbia County, New York
- Luykas Van Alen House
- Ichabod Crane Schoolhouse
- Jesse Merwin
- One-room school
- Washington Irving
- Dutch Colonial architecture (New Netherland)
- Kinderhook (town), New York'
- Kinderhook (village), New York
- List of historical societies in New York (state)

== Notes and references ==
Notes

Sources

- 100 Years, Columbia County History & Heritage, Vol.1, 2016, July 2016.
