= Chatham, New York =

- Town
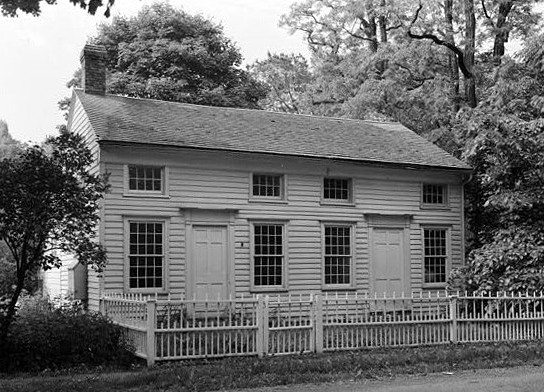
- Old Chatham

- Location of Chatham, New York
- Coordinates: 42°25′05″N 73°34′35″W
- Country: United States
- State: New York
- County: Columbia
- Established: 1795

Government
  - Type: Town Council
  - Town Supervisor: Donal Collins (NOP)
  - Town Council: Members: • Landra Haber (D); • John Wapner (D); • Bob Balcom (D); • Henry Swartz (R)

Area
  - Total: 53.54 sq mi (138.68 km^{2})
  - Land: 53.23 sq mi (137.86 km^{2})
  - Water: 0.32 sq mi (0.82 km^{2})
- Elevation: 240 ft (73 m)

Population (2020)
  - Total: 4,104
  - Density: 77.10/sq mi (29.77/km^{2})
- Time zone: UTC-5 (Eastern (EST))
  - Summer (DST): UTC-4 (EDT)
- ZIP Codes: 12037 (Chatham); 12060 (East Chatham); 12115 (Malden Bridge); 12132 (North Chatham); 12136 (Old Chatham); 12024 (Brainard); 12123 (Nassau); 12184 (Valatie)
- Area code: 518
- FIPS code: 36-021-14014
- GNIS feature ID: 0978814
- Website: www.chathamnewyork.us

Chatham /ˈtʃætəm/ is a town in Columbia County, New York, United States. The population was 4,104 at the 2020 census, a decline from the figure of 4,128 in 2010.

The town has a village also called Chatham on its southern town line. The town is at the northern border of Columbia County.

== History ==
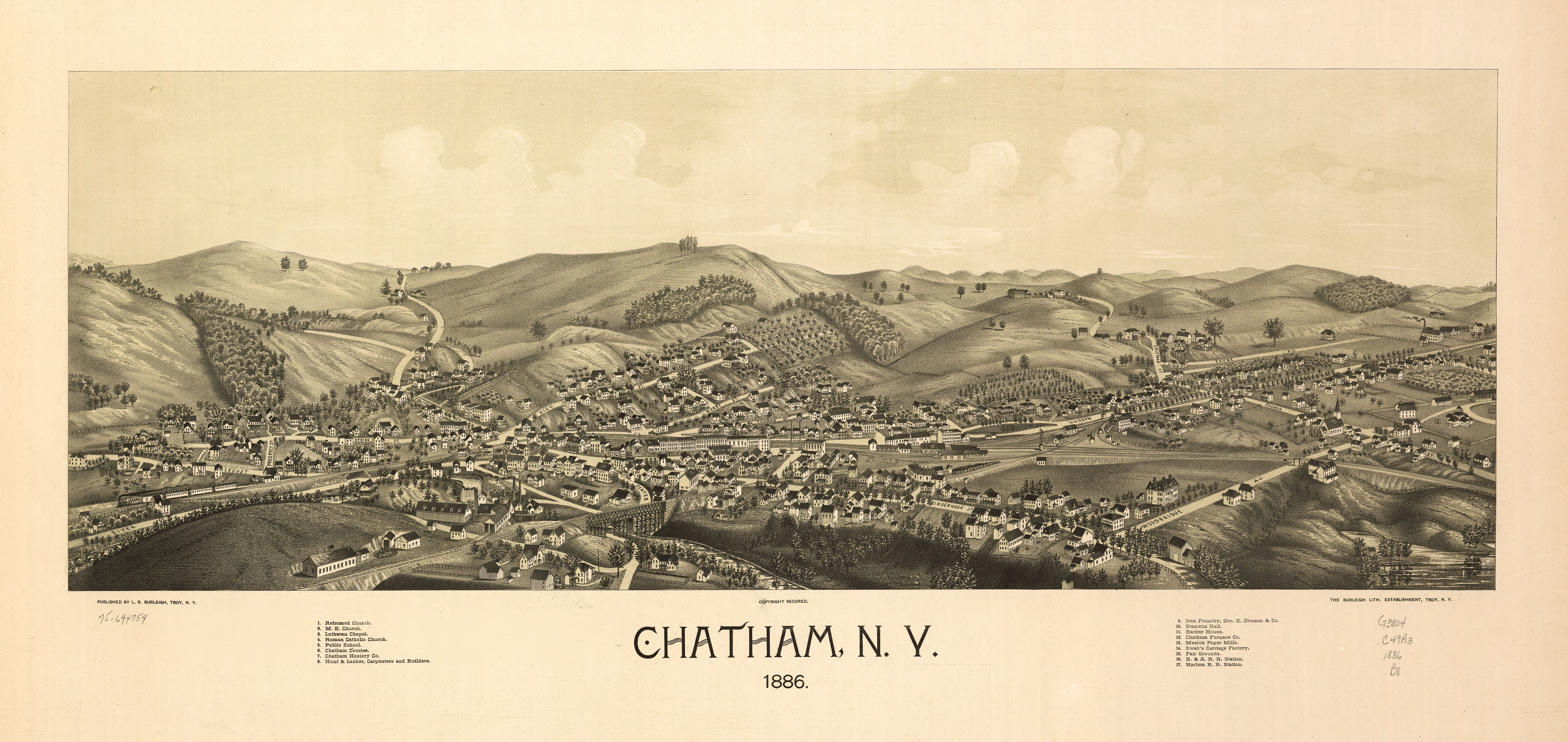
Panoramic map of Chatham Falls from 1886 by L.R. Burleigh including list of landmarks

The early settlers were Dutch, but later Quakers and New Englanders arrived. The town of Chatham was formed from the towns of Canaan and Kinderhook in 1795. Contradictory of its current condition or image, Chatham was an industrial center of multiple inter-state rail lines in the early 1900s, including the junction of the Boston and Albany Railroad for connections east and west, the Rutland Railroad for connections to Vermont to the north, and the New York Central's Harlem Line for connections to New York City. In 1887 a terminal designed by Henry Hobson Richardson was constructed. Amtrak service on the Lake Shore Limited passes through, east–west, but does not stop. In later years Amtrak has planned to build a rail station in Chatham.

The Blinn-Pulver Farmhouse, Melius-Bentley House, Peck House, Riders Mills Historic District, Silvernail Homestead, Simons General Store, Spengler Bridge, St. John's Lutheran Church, James G. Van Valkenburgh House, and John S. Williams House and Farm are listed on the National Register of Historic Places.

== Geography ==
According to the United States Census Bureau, the town has a total area of 53.6 square miles (138.7 km^{2}), of which 53.2 square miles (137.9 km^{2}) is land and 0.31 square miles (0.8 km^{2}), or 0.59%, is water.

The northern town line is the border of Rensselaer County.

The northern terminus of the Taconic State Parkway is in the town, and Interstate 90 passes through the town.

New York State Route 66 and New York State Route 203 intersect in the town.

=== Adjacent towns and areas ===
The town of Kinderhook is to the west, and the towns of Canaan and New Lebanon are to the east. The towns of Schodack and Nassau are to the north in Rensselaer County. The towns of Austerlitz and Ghent are to the south.

== Demographics ==
Historical population
Census	Pop.	Note	%±
1820	3,372		—
1830	3,538		4.9%
1840	3,662		3.5%
1850	3,839		4.8%
1860	4,163		8.4%
1870	4,372		5.0%
1880	4,574		4.6%
1890	4,019		−12.1%
1900	3,537		−12.0%
1910	3,396		−4.0%
1920	2,705		−20.3%
1930	2,908		7.5%
1940	2,873		−1.2%
1950	3,188		11.0%
1960	3,402		6.7%
1970	3,770		10.8%
1980	4,294		13.9%
1990	4,413		2.8%
2000	4,249		−3.7%
2010	4,128		−2.8%
2020	4,104		−0.6%
U.S. Decennial Census

As of the census of 2000, there were 4,249 people, 1,762 households, and 1,196 families residing in the town. The population density was 79.8 inhabitants per square mile (30.8/km^{2}). There were 2,110 housing units at an average density of 39.6 per square mile (15.3/km^{2}). The racial makeup of the town was 96% white, 1.74% black or African American, .21% Native American, .71% Asian, .16% Pacific Islander, .16% from other races, and 1.01% from two or more races. Hispanic or Latino of any race were 0.75% of the population.

There were 1,762 households, out of which 29.4% had children under the age of 18 living with them, 56.1% were married couples living together, 8.3% had a female householder with no husband present, and 32.1% were non-families. 25.1% of all households were made up of individuals, and 8.3% had someone living alone who was 65 years of age or older. The average household size was 2.41 and the average family size was 2.87.

In the town, the population was spread out, with 23.5% under the age of 18, 5.7% from 18 to 24, 24.6% from 25 to 44, 33.0% from 45 to 64, and 13.2% who were 65 years of age or older. The median age was 43 years. For every 100 females, there were 96.0 males. For every 100 females age 18 and over, there were 93.1 males.

The median income for a household in the town was $49,234, and the median income for a family was $60,097. Males had a median income of $40,067 versus $26,452 for females. The per capita income for the town was $28,599. About 4.8% of families and 6.6% of the population were below the poverty line, including 6.6% of those under age 18 and 4.6% of those age 65 or over.

== Communities and locations in the town ==
- Village of Chatham – A village whose northern half is in the town, by the southern town line.
- Chatham Center – A hamlet on NY-66, west of the geographic center of town and north of Chatham village.
- East Chatham – A hamlet at the eastern town line, east of Old Chatham.
- Kinderhook Lake – A lake partly in the town by the western town line.
- Malden Bridge – A hamlet in the northern part of the town, east of North Chatham.
- New Concord – A hamlet east of Rock City by the eastern town line.
- Niverville – A hamlet and census-designated place south of Kinderhook Lake on County Road 28B and New York State Route 203 that is primarily located in Kinderhook.
- North Chatham – A hamlet in the northwestern corner of the town. The Peck House and North Chatham Historic District are listed on the National Register of Historic Places.
- Old Chatham – A hamlet northeast of the geographic center of the town. It is one of the earliest settlements in the town.
- Rayville – A hamlet in the northeastern part of the town, northeast of Old Chatham on NY-66.
- Riders – A hamlet in the northeastern quadrant of the town, between Riders Mills and Rayville.
- Riders Mills – A hamlet in the northeastern part of the town.
- Rock City – A hamlet south of the geographic center of the town and north of Chatham village.

== Notable people ==
- Marguerite Chapman, film actress and model of the 1940s and 1950s, was born in Chatham.
- Kristine DeBell, film actress and model, best known as A.L. in Meatballs (film), born and raised in Chatham.
- Arthur Estabrook, researcher and eugenist, died in Chatham in 1973.
- Horace Peaslee, architect and landscape designer, born in Malden Bridge in 1884
- Lillian Shadic, All-American Girls Professional Baseball League player in the 1949 season, a Chatham native.
- Actor David Schramm, who portrayed Roy Biggins in the 1990s sitcom Wings, had a home in Chatham.

== See also ==
- Union Station (Chatham, New York)
