= Edward G. Wilbor =

American politician

- Born: 10 September 1807; Chatham, Columbia County, New York
- Died: 23 April 1869 (aged 61)
- Occupation: Politician
- Political party: Whig (first), then Republican
- Parent(s): Samuel S. Wilbor & Hannah Wilbor

Edward G. Wilbor (September 10, 1807 in Chatham, Columbia County, New York – April 23, 1869) was an American politician from New York.

== Life ==
He was the son of Samuel S. Wilbor and Hannah (Fitch) Wilbor. He attended the district schools and Kinderhook Academy, and became a farmer. He married Louisa Phelps, and they had several children.

He entered politics as a Whig, and ran twice unsuccessfully for the Assembly; and then became a Republican.

He was a member of the New York State Senate (11th D.) in 1866 and 1867.

He was buried at the Chatham Union Cemetery in Old Chatham, New York.

== Sources ==
- The New York Civil List compiled by Franklin Benjamin Hough, Stephen C. Hutchins and Edgar Albert Werner (1870; pg. 444)
- Life Sketches of the State Officers, Senators, and Members of the Assembly of the State of New York, in 1867 by S. R. Harlow & H. H. Boone (pg. 80f)

== See also ==
- The Wilbor House

New York State Senate
Preceded by John B. Dutcher	New York State Senate; 11th District; 1866–1867	Succeeded by Abiah W. Palmer
