= Peck House (Chatham, New York) =

Historic house in New York, United States

- U.S. National Register of Historic Places
- U.S. Historic district – Contributing property
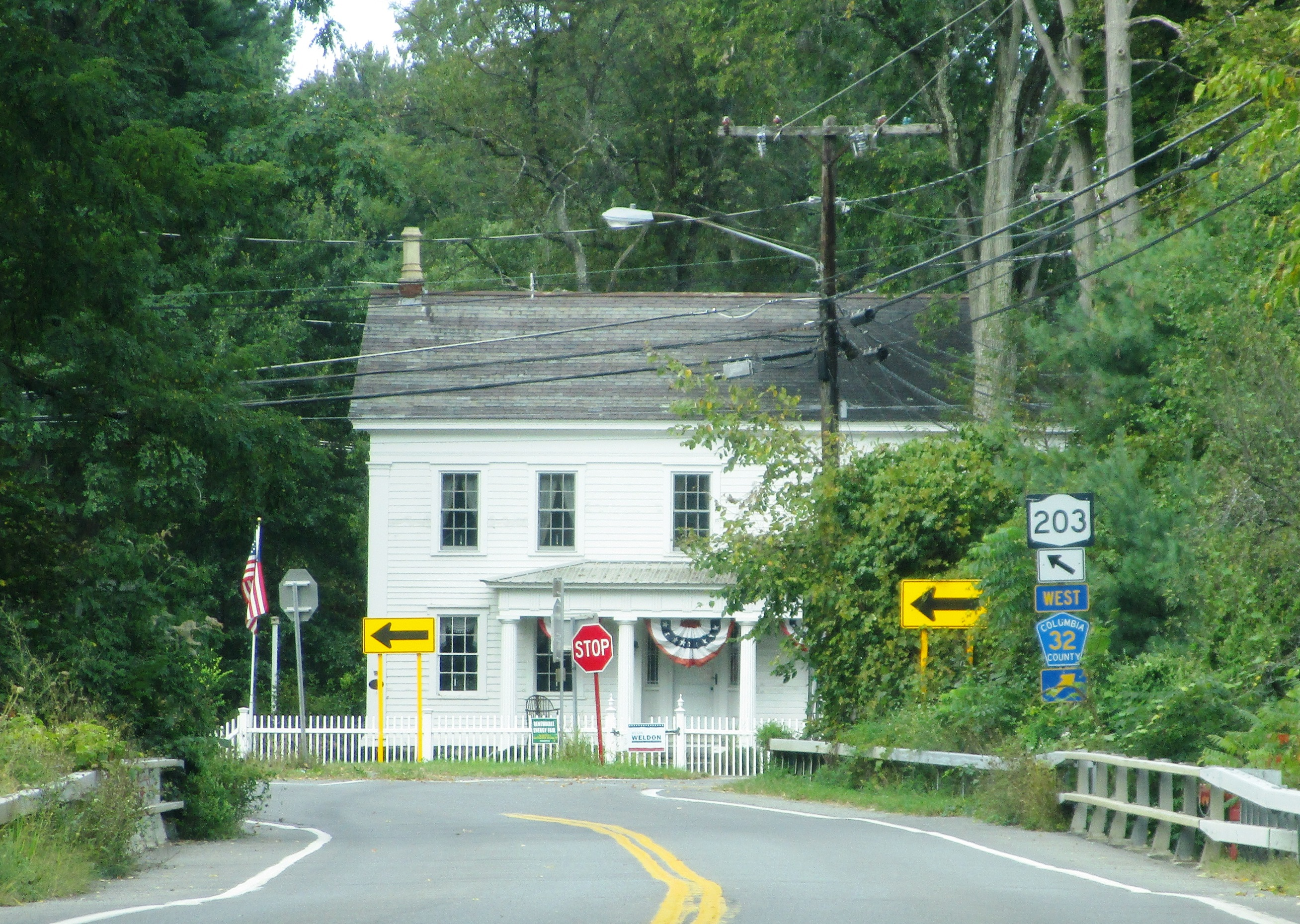

- Location within New York Location within the United States
- Location: NY 203, Chatham, New York
- Coordinates: 42°28′30″N 73°38′0″W
- Area: 1.9 acres (0.77 ha)
- Built: 1848
- Architectural style: Greek Revival
- Part of: North Chatham Historic District (ID12000596)
- NRHP reference No.: 99000869

Significant dates
- Added to NRHP: July 22, 1999
- Designated CP: September 4, 2012

Peck House is a historic Greek Revival-style home located in the hamlet of North Chatham in Columbia County, New York. It was reconstructed about 1848 and is an imposing, 2-story, symmetrical, five-bay-wide and one-bay-deep dwelling with a substantial 1 1/2-story rear wing. It features a three-bay, 1-story porch with Doric order columns. The interior features a number of Greek Revival–style details. Also on the property is a brick smoke house.

It was added to the National Register of Historic Places in 1973. It is also included as a contributing building in the North Chatham Historic District, which was added to the National Register in 2012.

Peck House is located at the intersection of County Road 32 and New York State Route 203.
