= John S. Williams House and Farm =

Historic house in New York, United States

- U.S. National Register of Historic Places
- U.S. Historic district
- Location within New York Location within the United States
- Nearest city: Shaker Museum Rd., approximately 1 mi. S of jct. with I-90, Chatham, New York
- Coordinates: 42°26′18″N 73°35′6″W
- Area: 253 acres (102 ha)
- Built: 1770
- Architect: Polhemus & Coffin
- Architectural style: Colonial Revival
- NRHP reference No.: 96001424
- Added to NRHP: December 16, 1996

John S. Williams House and Farm, also formerly known as Old Chatham Sheepherding Farm and Inn, is a historic home and farm designated a national historic district and located in Old Chatham, in Columbia County, New York. The property includes seven contributing buildings. They are: the main house, a farm employee cottage, another cottage, a stone tool shed (originally a smoke house), and three small barns / garages. The main house is a two-story, frame building with a center hall plan. The house dates to the about 1770, but was extensively enlarged and remodeled in 1935–1936 in the Colonial Revival style, under direction by New York City architects Polhemus & Coffin.

It was listed on the National Register of Historic Places in 1996.

As of 2020, the farm portion of the property is owned and managed by Silver Brothers Spirits Company. Silver Brothers is a New York State farm distillery specializing in terroir-driven whiskey made from grain grown on the property.
