= Nathan Wild House =

Historic house in New York, United States

- U.S. National Register of Historic Places
- Location within New York Location within the United States
- Location: 3007 Main St., Valatie, New York
- Coordinates: 42°24′51″N 73°40′46″W
- Area: 3.7 acres (1.5 ha)
- Built: 1826
- Architectural style: Italianate, Federal
- NRHP reference No.: 91000612
- Added to NRHP: May 30, 1991

The Nathan Wild House is an historic building in Valatie, Columbia County, New York, United States. Built by Nathan Wild, a prominent local figure, in 1826, the original Federal-style building was continually expanded throughout the years as the Wild family's textile mills in the area flourished. The residence was added to the National Register of Historic Places in 1991 as a result of its historical and architectural significance.

== Description ==
The Nathan Wild House is located on Main Street (New York State Route 203) in the village of Valatie, 18 miles (29 km) south of Albany, New York. It is situated on a 3.7-acre (1.5 ha) lot, which extends a full block. The house itself faces southward toward the road. It was built as a two-story, wood-frame Federal-style structure and eventually expanded using Italianate architecture. Several wings were added onto the residence after its initial construction, as well as a ballroom, which was built before 1873 off the west wing. A porch is located on the front facade, and a small back porch was added to the main section around 1850. The building's interior does not contain much of its original detail as a result of extensive remodeling at the same time. Since the home was profiled in History of Columbia County, New York (1873) by Franklin Ellis, it has not undergone any major changes.

== History ==
Shortly after 1800, Nathan Wild and his brother James moved from Manchester to the United States. After his employment at the Slater Mill Historic Site in Rhode Island, he migrated to Columbia County, where he was contracted by the Columbia Manufacturing Society to oversee the construction of a cotton mill. By the 1820s, Columbia County's economy relied significantly upon cotton and wool production. Ultimately, four years later, he built a new mill, using the first power looms in New York State. Another mill was built on the same property nearly 20 years later, and collectively, the Wild's Mill Complex had 12,800 spindles and 175 workers. The last remaining structure on the complex was demolished around 1986.

In 1826, Wild built a residence, where he, his wife and his nine children lived. The textile business expanded, and as a result of his wealth, local prominence as one of the founders of Valatie, and growing family, he added to the home and redesigned it. The home gained its modern-day appearance in the 1870s, and it was owned by the Wild family until 1978. The property is both historically and architecturally significant; its design is reminiscent of Valatie's milling era. It was listed on the National Register of Historic Places in 1991, and as of 2000 it was being considered for inclusion within the related Register listing for Wild's Mill Complex. Currently the Nathan Wild House has been restored to a private home, after several years' operation as a bed and breakfast.

== See also ==
- National Register of Historic Places listings in Columbia County, New York
