= Joseph FewSmith =

American minister

Joseph Fewsmith, during his lifetime written Few Smith, (January 7, 1816 – June 22, 1888) was an American Presbyterian minister.

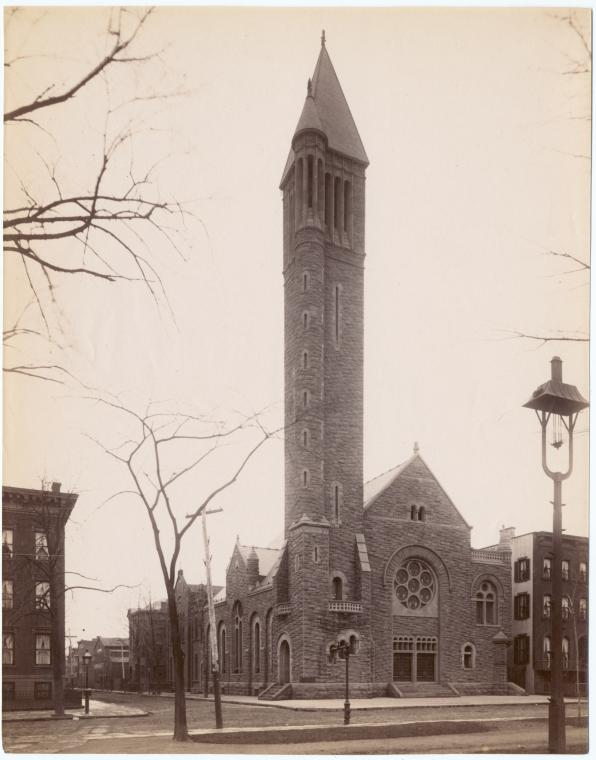
The Second Presbyterian Church in Newark, destroyed by fire in 1930.

FewSmith was born in Philadelphia, Pa., January 7, 1816. In early life he was in business with his father, a wholesale flour-merchant in Philadelphia, for several years, after which he entered Yale College, in 1837. On graduation in 1840 he became a tutor in Western Reserve College, at Hudson, Ohio; and during the two years which he spent there he was also occupied in the study of divinity under the Rev. Dr. L. P. Hickok, the Professor of Theology. In 1842 he was ordained by the Lutheran Synod at Rhinebeck, New York, and was settled over a church in Valatie, Columbia County. In 1843, however, he removed to the Lutheran Church in Winchester, Va., and after five years' service there he resigned in 1848 to become Professor of Sacred Rhetoric and Pastoral Theology in the Auburn Theological Seminary. He left Auburn in 1851 for Newark, New Jersey, where he was installed in December as pastor of the Second Presbyterian Church. In this office he remained until his sudden death from apoplexy, at Newark, on June 22, 1888, in his 73rd year.

As one of the founders of the German Theological School in New Jersey, as President of the Board of Church Erection for many years, as a Director of the Union Theological Seminary from 1852, and as a member of various important committees of the Presbyterian General Assembly, Dr. FewSmith had wide ecclesiastical influence; while his eminent usefulness as a pastor was evidenced by the high esteem in which he was held in Newark. The degree of Doctor of Divinity was conferred on him in 1855 by Columbia College.

He married, October 31, 1843, Emma C. Livingston, of New York City, who survived him with three of their six children, two sons and a daughter. One son graduated Yale in 1871.
