= Wild's Mill Complex =

- U.S. National Register of Historic Places
- U.S. Historic district
- Location within New York Location within the United States
- Location: U.S. 9 and NY 203, Valatie, New York
- Coordinates: 42°24′47″N 73°40′52″W
- Area: 5.5 acres (2.2 ha)
- Built: 1828
- Architectural style: Federal, Industrial
- NRHP reference No.: 82003353
- Added to NRHP: June 14, 1982

Wild's Mill Complex (also known as Valatie Mill Complex) was among the last remaining industrial buildings in the formerly thriving milling community of Valatie, Columbia County, New York, United States. It was located southeast of the intersection between U.S. Route 9 and State Route 203. A five-story brick structure, it served as an historical landmark and its 5.5 acres (2.2 ha) lot contained the ruins of a previous mill. It was situated along the west bank of the Kinderhook Creek.

The original northern section of the building was built in 1846, at 144 feet (44 m) long and 56 feet (17 m) wide. Its builder is unknown. A large addition was constructed around 1890. The owner of the mills, Nathan Wild, emigrated from England in the early 19th century and ultimately moved to Columbia County. He is known as one of the founders of the village of Valatie, which had become an important industrial center. In 1828 Wild built the initial brick mill. After the construction of the southern building, the mills—used to manufacture cotton—had a combined 12,800 spindles and 175 workers.

After Wild's death in 1867, his sons gained responsibility of the mills. The southern mill was bought by William Harder, who built the addition, in 1890. Modified into a paper mill in the 1890s, the northern mill eventually burned during the 1950s. The southern mill continued to produce cotton products until 1956. A two-story Federal-style building between the two mills was marked as the mill office on early maps, and has since been converted into a residence. However, it is considered an uncommon instance of a standing early 19th-century office building. Among the earliest textile mill complexes in Columbia County, the property was listed on the National Register of Historic Places on June 14, 1982. Around 1986, the last of Wild's mills was demolished. Wild's residence, the Nathan Wild House, is still standing and is also listed on the Register.

== See also ==
- National Register of Historic Places listings in Columbia County, New York
