= Senator Tobey (disambiguation) =

Charles W. Tobey (1880–1953) was a U.S. Senator from New Hampshire from 1939 to 1953. Senator Tobey:

- Franklin W. Tobey (1844–1878), New York State Senate
- William H. Tobey (1799–1878), New York State Senate
