= Chatham (village), New York =

Chatham, New York
- Village
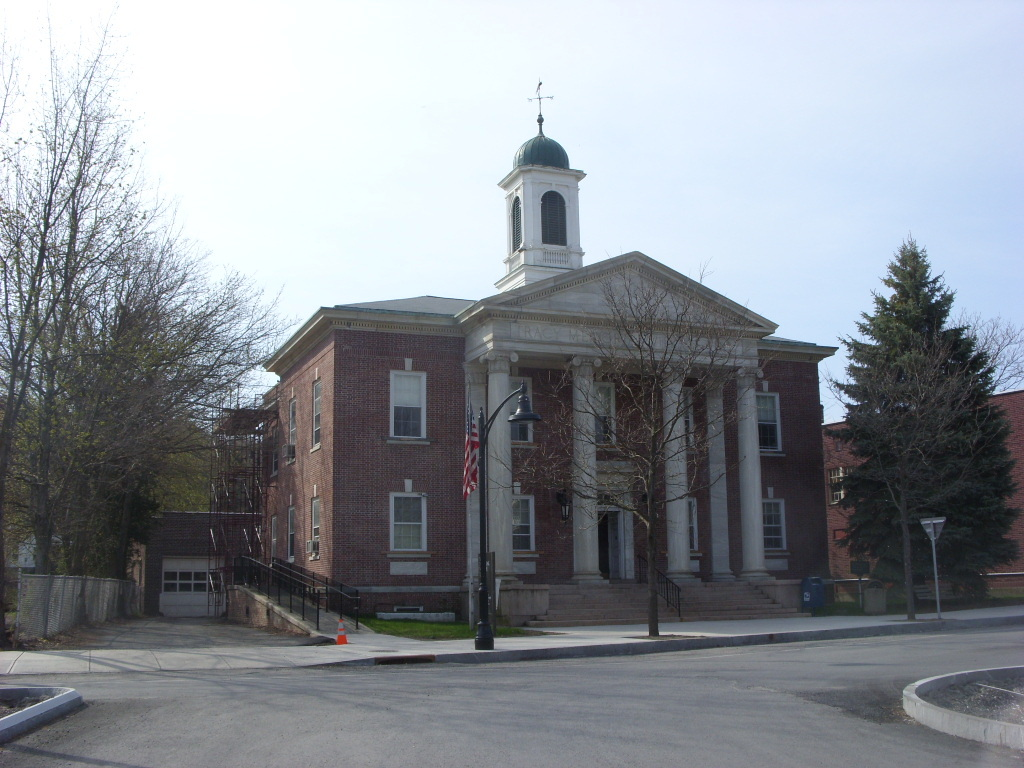
- Tracy Memorial Village Hall, April 2009

- Location of Chatham, New York
- Coordinates: 42°21′43″N 73°35′59″W
- Country: United States
- State: New York
- County: Columbia
- Towns: Chatham, Ghent

Area
  - Total: 1.24 sq mi (3.21 km^{2})
  - Land: 1.24 sq mi (3.20 km^{2})
  - Water: 0.0039 sq mi (0.01 km^{2})
- Elevation: 463 ft (141 m)

Population (2020)
  - Total: 1,529
  - Density: 1,236.2/sq mi (477.29/km^{2})
- Time zone: UTC-5 (Eastern (EST))
  - Summer (DST): UTC-4 (EDT)
- ZIP code: 12037
- Area code: 518
- FIPS code: 36-14003
- GNIS feature ID: 0946448
- Website: villageofchathamny.gov

Chatham /ˈtʃætəm/ is a village in Columbia County, New York, United States. The population was 1,529 at the 2020 census.

The village of Chatham is on the border between the towns of Chatham and Ghent. The village is at the junction of Routes 66 and 203.

== History ==
The village was incorporated in 1869. Chatham was originally named Groats Corners. The village is the home of the 1814 Blinn-Pulver Farmhouse.

Chatham hosts a variety of attractions, such as the Crandell Theatre, which shows many popular movies at very reasonable prices. The Village is the host of the Columbia County Agricultural Society and the annual Columbia County Fair. The Mac-Hadyn Theater is a summer stock theater, active from May through September, that puts on Broadway-style shows. The famous stage and film actor Nathan Lane was part of their company at one time.

The Tracy Memorial Village Hall Complex and Union Station are listed on the National Register of Historic Places.

== Geography ==
Chatham is located at 42°21′43″N 73°35′58″W (42.36207, -73.599686). The northern half of the village, and the central business area, is in the town of Chatham, while the southern half is in the town of Ghent.

According to the United States Census Bureau, the village has a total area of 1.2 square miles (3.2 km^{2}), of which 0.004 square miles (0.01 km^{2}), or 0.34%, is water. The village is located on Stony Kill, a waterway that makes a U-shaped bend through the village and flows north to Kinderhook Creek, a tributary of the Hudson River.

== Demographics ==
Historical population
Census	Pop.	Note	%±
1870	1,387		—
1880	1,765		27.3%
1890	1,912		8.3%
1900	2,018		5.5%
1910	2,251		11.5%
1920	2,710		20.4%
1930	2,424		−10.6%
1940	2,254		−7.0%
1950	2,304		2.2%
1960	2,426		5.3%
1970	2,239		−7.7%
1980	2,001		−10.6%
1990	1,920		−4.0%
2000	1,758		−8.4%
2010	1,770		0.7%
2020	1,529		−13.6%
U.S. Decennial Census

As of the census of 2000, there were 1,758 people, 742 households, and 425 families residing in the village. The population density was 1,492.0 inhabitants per square mile (576.1/km^{2}). There were 802 housing units at an average density of 680.7 per square mile (262.8/km^{2}). The racial makeup of the village was 94.03% White, 3.07% black or African American, .34% Native American, .4% Asian, .11% Pacific Islander, .17% from other races, and 1.88% from two or more races. Hispanic or Latino of any race were 1.65% of the population.

There were 742 households, out of which 31.1% had children under the age of 18 living with them, 41.0% were married couples living together, 12.4% had a female householder with no husband present, and 42.7% were non-families. 37.6% of all households were made up of individuals, and 14.4% had someone living alone who was 65 years of age or older. The average household size was 2.33 and the average family size was 3.06.

In the village, the population was spread out, with 26.1% under the age of 18, 6.8% from 18 to 24, 27.6% from 25 to 44, 24.6% from 45 to 64, and 15.0% who were 65 years of age or older. The median age was 38 years. For every 100 females, there were 90.1 males. For every 100 females age 18 and over, there were 83.6 males.

The median income for a household in the village was $39,063, and the median income for a family was $44,500. Males had a median income of $32,083 versus $24,327 for females. The per capita income for the village was $19,476. About 6.7% of families and 8.4% of the population were below the poverty line, including 8.4% of those under age 18 and 10.7% of those age 65 or over.

As of the 2010 census, Chatham was 86.5% white, 5.0% Hispanic, 3.3% black, 2.4% Multiracial, 2.0% Asian, 0.3% Native American, 0.3 Other race, and 0.06% Native Hawaiian.

== Transportation ==
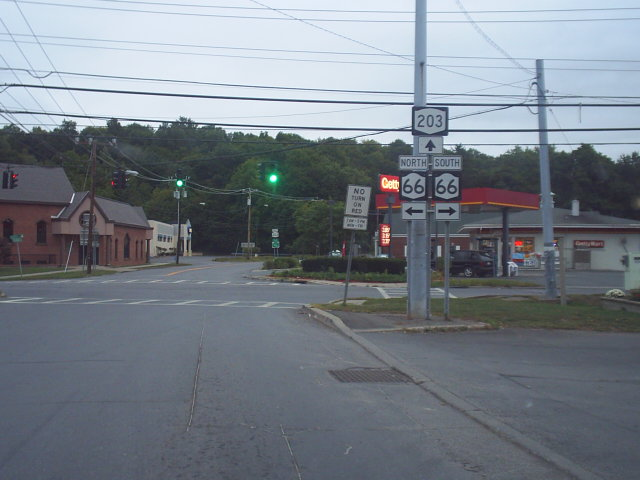
Chatham's sole signalized intersection

Chatham has only one traffic light; right turn on red is allowed at that intersection. It has 49 stop signs, 11 yield signs, and one traffic circle. In addition, there are 121 signs regulating parking.

Previous to the NYSDOT renovations, cars driving in the traffic circle on Main Street yielded to cars entering the circle, which is an unusual traffic pattern. This pattern was changed to be in compliance with NY state traffic laws in 2008. NYSDOT supplied funding to rebuild Main Street including installing a new water main, drainage structures, granite curbing and concrete sidewalk. Main Street was closed to vehicular traffic during this period. After Main Street's existing pavement was excavated, the road was filled with crushed stone, providing pedestrian access to shops along the street. Various side streets were repaved with asphalt and new curbing and sidewalk was installed as well. A new retaining wall with H-pile was built on Hudson Avenue. This work was carried out in 2008 and 2009. The prime contractor was A. Colarusso & Son Inc., based in Hudson, New York. During construction, NYS Senator Stephen M. Saland showed up briefly to witness progress.

The village was a hub of the New York Central, Boston and Albany, and Rutland railroads, with three wyes and one roundhouse.

== Events ==
- Columbia County Fair: late August-early September
  - Firefighters parade
- Fairgrounds auto show: spring/late May
- Civil War reenactment: summer

== Notable people ==
- George McClellan, US congressman
- Sanford W. Smith, New York Senator and NY State Supreme Court Justice
