= Riders Mills Historic District =

Historic district in New York, United States

- U.S. National Register of Historic Places
- U.S. Historic district
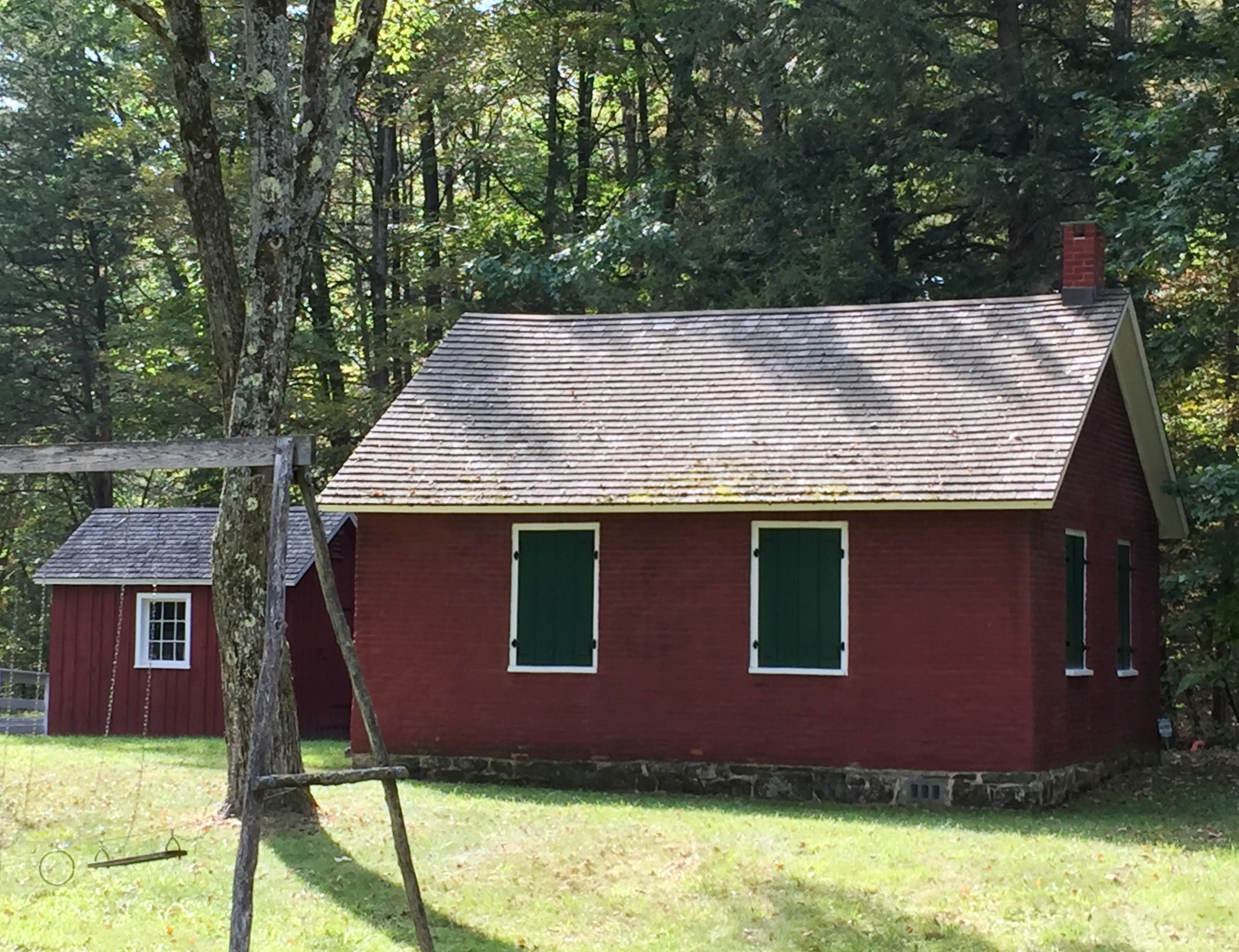
- Riders Mills Schoolhouse

- Location within New York Location within the United States
- Location: NY 66, Bachus Rd., Riders Mills Rd., Chatham, New York
- Coordinates: 42°28′43″N 73°33′40″W
- Area: 200 acres (81 ha)
- Architectural style: Georgian, Greek Revival, et al.
- NRHP reference No.: 00000877
- Added to NRHP: August 2, 2000

Riders Mills Historic District is a national historic district located at Chatham in Columbia County, New York. The district includes 20 contributing buildings, eight contributing structures, and one contributing site. It includes the remnants of the one thriving hamlet of Riders Mills, located along the Kinderhook Creek and largely wiped out by a flood in 1869. Most of the buildings are residential and date to the early to mid-19th century and reflect a variety of popular architectural styles such as Georgian and Greek Revival. In addition to residences, the district includes a schoolhouse and bridge. There are also eight known archaeological sites, mostly the foundations of mills and residences.

It was listed on the National Register of Historic Places in 2000.
