= Crandell Theatre =

The nonprofit Crandell Theatre is located in the Village of Chatham, N.Y., and is Columbia County’s oldest and largest single-screen movie theater. The nearly 100-year-old community cinema is supported by ticket sales and earned revenue, contributions of members and friends, and private and public grants, including the New York State Council on the Arts with the support of the Office of the Governor and the New York State Legislature. The theater is dedicated to enriching the cultural vitality of the region through film programming that challenges, inspires, educates and entertains.

The Crandell was built by Walter S. Crandell, a Chatham native, New York stockbroker, and later, a local banker. Considered an architectural gem, the theater was constructed in Spanish Renaissance style, a 16th-century design aesthetic from Spain that combines Moorish elements with those from the Italian Renaissance. It remains largely unchanged since it opened on Christmas Day, 1926, with the silent masterpiece Michael Strogoff. It has many unique features not found in today's movie houses, including a full 26-foot (7.9 m) wide and 13-foot (4.0 m) deep stage with dressing rooms, a balcony featuring 36 original 1926 seats, an orchestra pit, and organ lofts on each side of the stage. The Crandell was added to the State and National Registers of Historic Places, selected by The New York State Office of Parks, Recreation and Historic Preservation (OPRHP), in 2017.

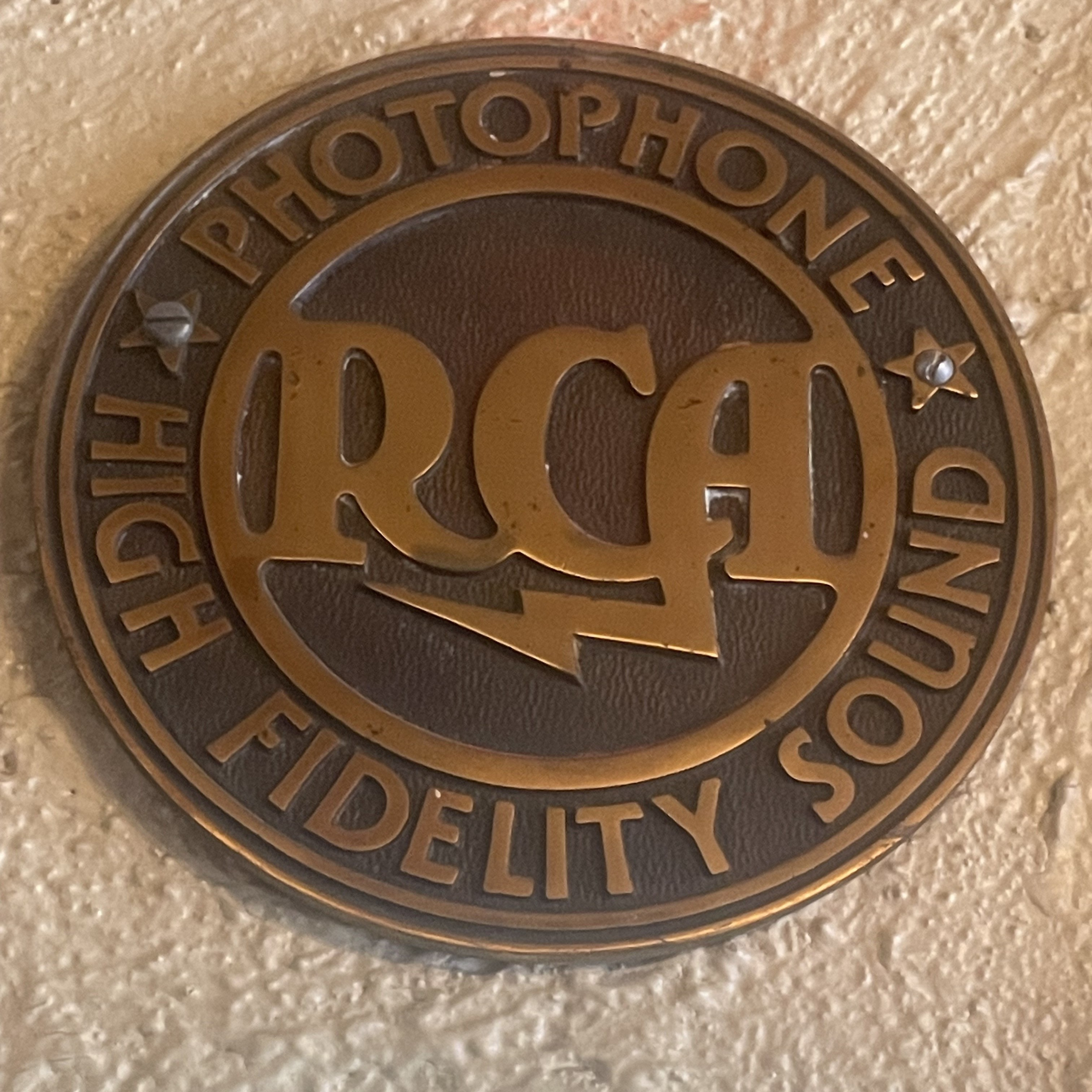
Walter Crandell installed the emerging RCA Photophone technology in 1929.

Constructed on the site of a residence formerly owned by Walter Crandell's father and grandfather, the pink brick-and-stucco theater was built at a cost of $100,000 pre-Depression dollars. It was envisioned as a movie house for silent moving pictures. Moving pictures quickly mesmerized audiences everywhere and vaudeville acts never performed at the Crandell. In 1929, in recognition of the growing importance of talking movies after 1927's The Jazz Singer was released, the theater installed a cutting-edge RCA Photophone system.

The Crandell has been in continuous operation for 99 years. For nearly 50 of those years it has been associated with the Quirino family. Anthony Quirino purchased the Crandell in 1960, and the theater was owned and operated by his son, Tony, until Tony's death in 2010.

In 1998 the Chatham Film Club (CFC) was organized by area film enthusiasts to bring additional independent and foreign films to the area on a regular schedule. Members approached Tony Quirino, then-owner of the Crandell, and arranged to rent the theatre for monthly Sunday matinees. In 2000 CFC joined with the Columbia County Council on the Arts to produce the first FilmColumbia festival, a weekend of films shown at the Crandell. Following Tony Quirino's death in 2010, the Crandell was closed and faced an uncertain future. With an outpouring of community support and the leadership of the Ellsworth Kelly Foundation, Lael Locke, and Judy Grunberg, Chatham Film Club raised approximately $600,000 to buy the theatre and make much needed repairs. The immediate renovations included a new roof, new HVAC system, new steam boiler, and façade and marquee repair. Additionally, the installation of digital projection and compliant sound systems allowed the Crandell to keep pace with industry Digital Cinema Projection (DCP) standards and show first-run and feature films the way the filmmakers intended.

The Crandell reopened just six months later on July 9, 2010, as a 501(c)(3), not-for-profit, community-based theater. In August 2018 the name of the organization was officially changed to the Crandell Theatre, bringing together all of its many ongoing programs and shared core values: an enthusiasm for film and its importance as an art and entertainment form; producing the renowned and popular annual film festival FilmColumbia; and the commitment to operate and maintain the theater as a centerpiece of Main Street, Chatham, and a singular resource for the Hudson Valley, particularly Columbia County.

The Crandell Theater specializes in both first-run and second-run movies, family-oriented movies and also hosts many community events, including Q+As with film and television actors, directors and editors. The Crandell Theatre is the main venue for the FilmColumbia Festival, now an annual 10-day film festival held every October. Over the past decade the festival has shown more than 650 pre-release movies from around the world. Of these, 41 have received Academy Awards in individual categories to date. The Crandell also hosts Farm Film Fest, a day of film about local farming in the Hudson Valley sponsored by The Chatham Agricultural Partnership, The Crandell Theatre, and The Columbia Land Conservancy Programming Committee. Crandell Kid Flicks, a seasonal series of children's films paired with themed activities, was created by area filmmaker Mirissa Neff. It launched in January 2023. Neff, now the theater's Executive Director, launched the new series Sonic Sundays after the theater reopened following its $4.2 million restoration and renovation.

In 2016, part-time Columbia County resident Al Roker gave TODAY Show viewers an inside look at a typical night at the theater, trying his hand at the ticket booth, the concession stand and the projection room. He calls the Crandell "the lifeblood of the community."

A complete restoration and state-of-the-art renovation of the historic theater was completed in October 2025.

== Articles ==
- https://www.npr.org/2008/10/24/96124905/small-town-festival-focuses-on-films-not-stars
- http://blog.timesunion.com/realestate/report-crandell-theater-may-have-a-new-owner/3335/
- http://www.ruralintelligence.com/index.php/arts_section/arts_articles_movies/chatham_film_club_prevails_crandell_theatre_set_to_re-open_july_4/
