= John B. Dutcher =

American politician

John Bowdish Dutcher (February 13, 1830 Dover, Dutchess County, New York – August 27, 1911 Pawling, Dutchess Co, NY) was an American farmer, businessman, banker and politician from New York.

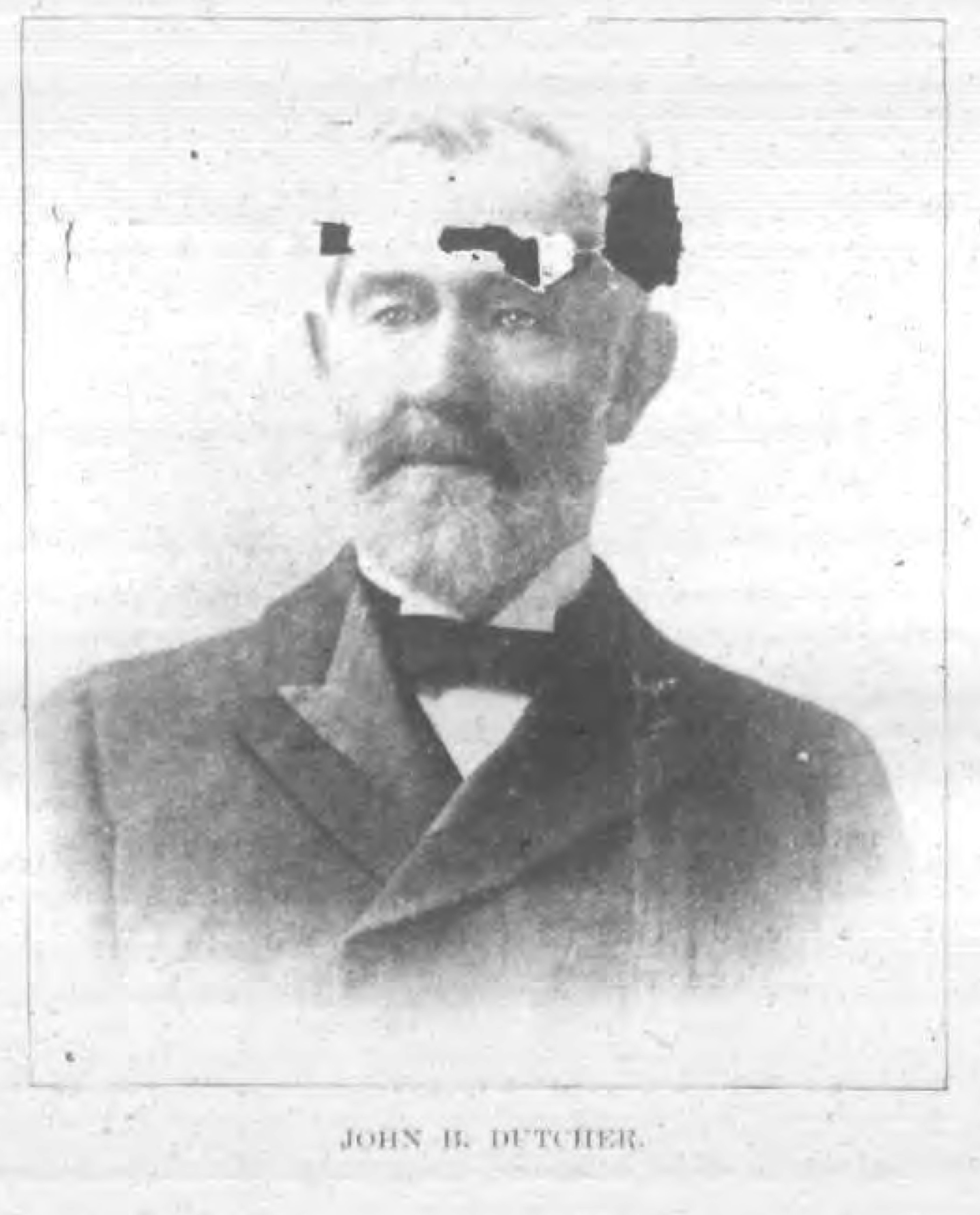

== Life ==
He was the son of David Dutcher (c.1797–1853) and Amy (Bowdish) Dutcher (c.1801–1875). He was Supervisor of the Town of Dover in 1857; and was elected a Justice of the Peace in 1858. On May 22, 1860, he married Christina Dodge, and they had a son.

He was a member of the New York State Assembly (Dutchess Co., 1st D.) in 1861 and 1862; and of the New York State Senate (11th D.) in 1864 and 1865.

In April 1861, he removed to the neighboring Town of Pawling, and was the first President of the Village of Pawling, elected upon its incorporation in 1893. In 1864, he became a director of the New York and Harlem Railroad, and later was a director of many railroad and other companies.

In April 1894, his son John G. Dutcher married Helen Titus Willets. He was President of the National Bank of Pawling, the New York State Bankers Association, and the New York State Agricultural Society (1893-1894).

== Sources ==
- The New York Civil List compiled by Franklin Benjamin Hough, Stephen C. Hutchins and Edgar Albert Werner (1870; pg. 443, 493 and 495)
- Biographical Sketches of the State Officers and Members of the Legislature of the State of New York in 1861 by William D. Murphy (pg. 185f)
- Short bio and portrait in Harlem Valley Pathways by Joyce C. Ghee & Joan Spence ("Images of America" series, Arcadia Publishing, 1998; pg. 15f)
- Bio in America's Successful Men of Affairs by Henry Hall (1896; pg. 211)
- John B. Dutcher, Banker, Dies one of the items titled "PUTNAM COUNTY 25 YEARS AGO", in The Putnam County Courier on September 4, 1936

New York State Assembly
| Preceded by Abiah W. Palmer | New York State Assembly; Dutchess County, 1st District; 1861–1862 | Succeeded by Luther S. Dutcher |
New York State Senate
| Preceded by William H. Tobey | New York State Senate; 11th District; 1864–1865 | Succeeded by Edward G. Wilbor |
