= James G. Van Valkenburgh House =

Historic house in New York, United States

- U.S. National Register of Historic Places
- Location within New York Location within the United States
- Location: 31 Co. Rd. 13, Chatham, New York
- Coordinates: 42°25′18″N 73°36′30″W
- Area: 97.5 acres (39.5 ha)
- Built: 1843
- Architectural style: Greek Revival
- NRHP reference No.: 02000358
- Added to NRHP: April 11, 2002

James G. Van Valkenburgh House is a historic home located at Chatham in Columbia County, New York. It was built in 1843 and is a Greek Revival–style residence. It is a large, 2-story, five-bay center-entrance, two-bay-deep, frame dwelling with a large 1 1/2-story service wing. The main entry features a single-story open porch with four fluted Doric order columns and a deep entablature. Also on the property are a garage, two barns, and a well house.

It was added to the National Register of Historic Places in 2002.
