= First Presbyterian Church (Valatie, New York) =

Historic church in New York, United States

- U.S. National Register of Historic Places
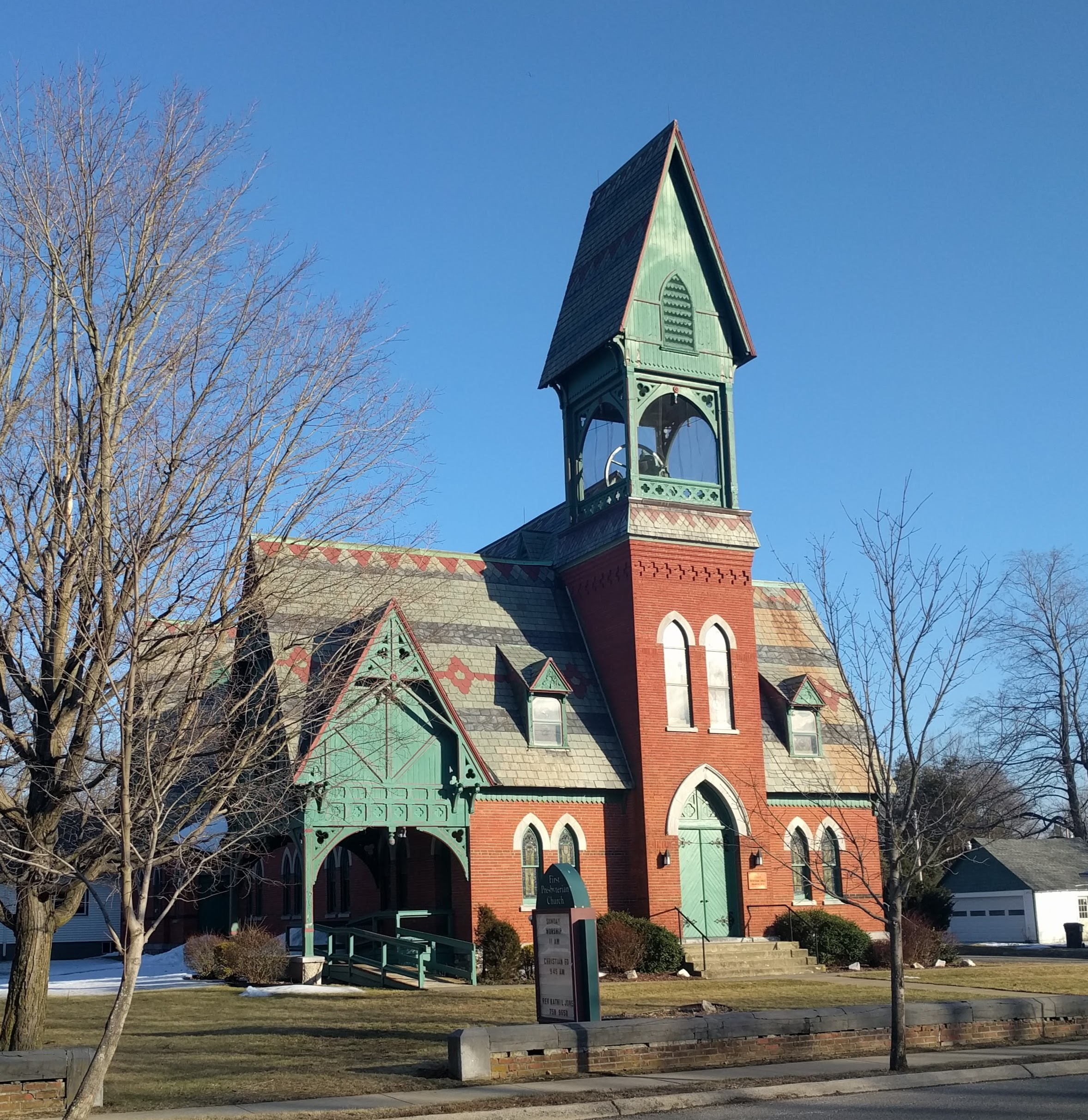
- First Presbyterian Church, February 2011

- Location within New York Location within the United States
- Location: Church St., Valatie, New York
- Coordinates: 42°24′55″N 73°40′36″W
- Area: 1 acre (0.40 ha)
- Built: 1878
- Architect: Ogden & Wright
- Architectural style: Gothic
- NRHP reference No.: 79001574
- Added to NRHP: September 7, 1979

First Presbyterian Church is a historic Presbyterian church at Church St. in Valatie, Columbia County, New York. It was built in 1878 and is a one-story, rectangular building built of face brick with limestone trim in the High Victorian Gothic style. It features three very steep gable roofs surfaced with polychrome slate, dormer windows, a porte cochere, and an engaged brick tower capped by an open belfry.

It was listed on the National Register of Historic Places in 1979.
