= North Chatham Historic District =

Historic district in New York, United States

- U.S. National Register of Historic Places
- U.S. Historic district
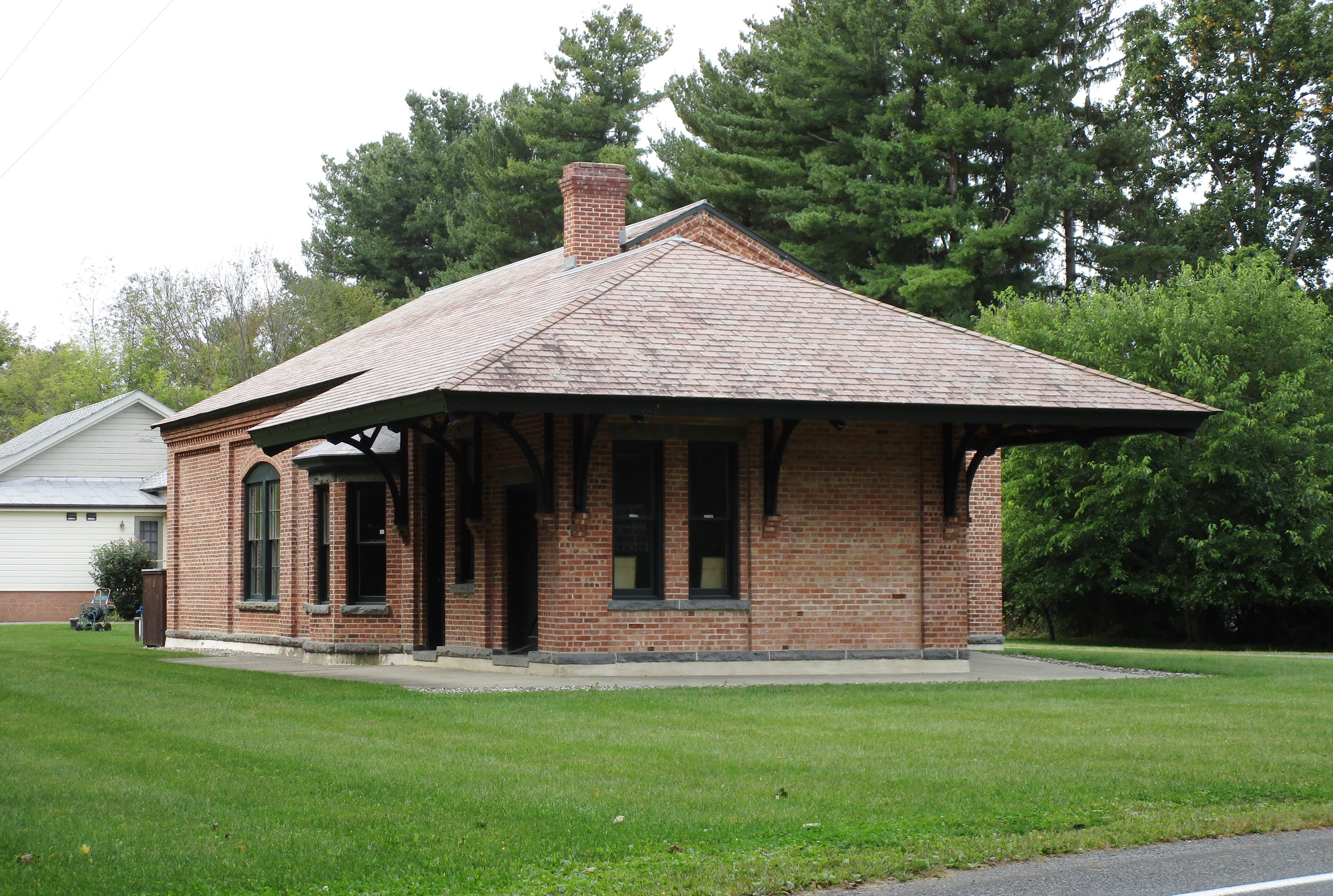
- North Chatham Depot (c. 1900)

- Location within New York Location within the United States
- Location: NY 203, County Roads 32 & 17, Depot St., Mill Ln., Bunker Hill & Dorn Rds., North Chatham, New York
- Coordinates: 42.47079°N 73.63172°W
- Area: 407.39 acres (164.86 ha)
- Built: c. 1785-1930
- Architectural style: Federal, Greek Revival, Gothic Revival, Italianate, Queen Anne
- NRHP reference No.: 12000596
- Added to NRHP: September 4, 2012

North Chatham Historic District is a historic district consisting of most or all of the hamlet of North Chatham in Columbia County, New York. It was listed on the National Register of Historic Places in 2023.

The district then included 110 contributing buildings, 21 contributing structures, two contributing sites, and one contributing object. The center of the district, along the north-south New York State Route 203, has most of the buildings. Included in the north end of the district is a small traffic triangle where NYS 203, Bunker Hill Rd., and County Road 32 intersect. A segment of the historic district including the North Chatham Depot extends north and west of that along Bunker Hill Rd., County Road 32 and Depot St. At the south end of the district are a few buildings on County Road 17 and Dorn Rd. And hidden from direct view is a mill yard which was the "industrial core" of North Chatham.

North Chatham developed between about 1785 and 1930, and includes notable examples of Federal, Greek Revival, Gothic Revival, Italianate, and Queen Anne style architecture. Located in the district is the separately listed Peck House. Other notable buildings include the Methodist Church (1867), the North Chatham Depot (a trolley station built c. 1900), and cider mill (c. 1880).

== At the north end ==
Coming south on NYS 203 from the New York State Thruway, from the northeast of the district, there's a sign for "North Chatham" on the right and then the North Chatham Fire Department is on the left, and the district begins just after that where County Road 32 comes in from the left.

To the north, on Bunker Hill Rd., are:

To the east is Depot St. with the North Chatham Depot

=== North Chatham Depot ===
The North Chatham Depot, or North Chatham Trolley Station, at 580 County Road 32, was built around 1900 along the route of the Albany & Hudson Electric Railway. It was renovated in 2013 and became home of the North Chatham Historical Society.

"Also representative of a distinctive non-domestic building typology is the former North Chatham Trolley Station, ca. 1900, which has recently been restored. It is the only brick building included within the historic district; both its brick walls and slate roof afforded it a greater measure of durability and fire protection than frame buildings. It is of a characteristic form for a small rural trolley or train station at the turn of the twentieth century, by which time this building type had assumed distinctive traits, as expressed in its low-slung linear form—in this instance combining gabled and hipped roof masses—with prominent bracketed overhang to shield passengers from the elements."

=== Peck House ===
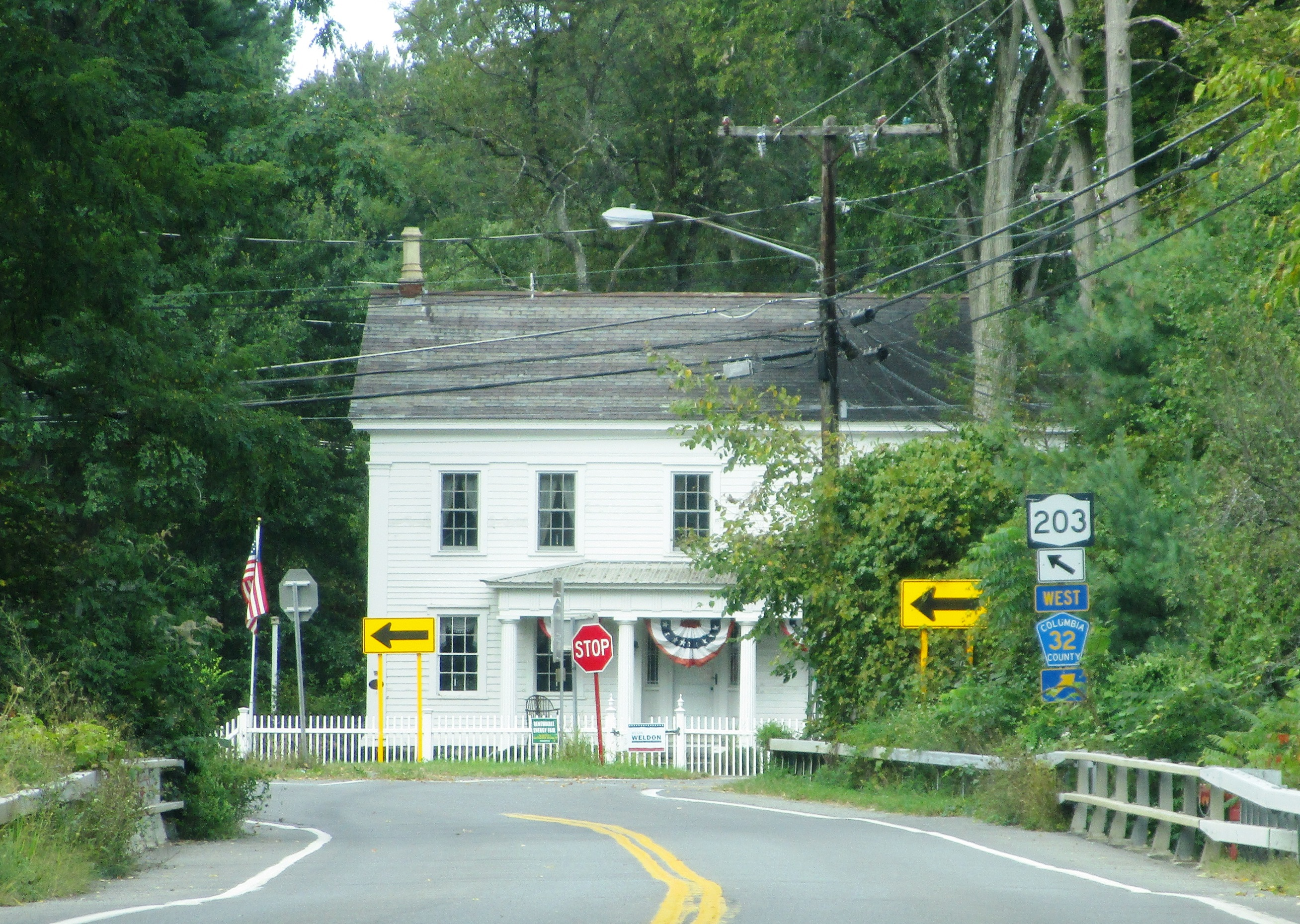
Peck House

The Peck House's property is on the southwest corner of County Road 32 and State Route 203.

Dr. O.J. Peck House. c. 1785 & later (contributing building; previously NRHP-listed) "Two-story wood frame gable-roofed dwelling with rear ell and distinctive Greek Revival-style detail. Present building was by all indications erected using part of an on-site 1785 house. The lean-to at rear is said to have been a 1953 replacement. The house features painted clapboard siding; wide pilasters with Doric capitals; frieze board below the eaves; six-over-six double-hung wood windows; a central entrance door with narrow, rectangular sidelights; rectangular attic windows with divided lights. There is a one-story bluestone slab porch abutting the east facade with classically inspired Grecian Doric columns and a low hipped roof. The roof of the main block is covered with slate shingles. There are two brick chimneys at the north and south ends of the gable roof respectively, each with a Gothic-inspired clay chimney pot."

- Smokehouse. c. 1840 (contributing structure) Brick smokehouse with slate covered gable roof; walls are laid up in a common bond pattern not indicative of a previously suggested date of c. 1785.
- Neoclassical Garden Folly (non-contributing building)
- Neoclassical garden temple with octagonal shaped dome roof with standing seam metal, supported by eight wood Doric order columns resting on a stone floor.
- Wood picket fence (non-contributing structure)
- Automobile Garage (non-contributing structure)"

== West side of NYS 203 ==
Along the right side of NYS 2013 coming south, so on the west side of the route, resources include:

=== 4042 State Route 203 ===
4042 State Route 203 (c. 1835), is a "T-shaped frame Greek Revival-style dwelling with two-story, five-bay center entrance front block. The front block has clapboard siding and a slate roof. The rear block, which includes a small west wing and south-facing lean-to, has a standing-seam metal roof Decorative features of the front block include pilasters with corresponding capitals, frieze and a molded wood cornice, and a Greek Revival frontispiece consisting of a two-paneled front door and full-length sidelights, each consisting of six lights, flanked by pilasters with capitals. A larger enframement, consisting of pilasters and a corresponding entablature, completes the entrance composition. Windows are fitted with six-over-six wood sash. The full width of the facade is spanned by a porch sustained by four Tuscan order columns executed with entasis, which give way to a denticulated wood cornice." The property also includes:

- Brick Smokehouse, c. 1835 (contributing structure) Located behind dwelling.
- Frame Carriage Barn, c. 1835 (contributing building), Gable-ended frame building with a lean-to on the northwest elevation. Building has wood siding and a standing-seam metal roof Paired doors access a large central bay on the east elevation.
- Poultry House, c. 1920 (contributing structure) Shed-roofed frame building, located northwest of house.
- English Barn, c. 1875 (contributing building) Large three-bay English barn erected with a circular-sawn timber frame. Access is via doors on the longer sides as is typical of this type. The building has vertical board siding and a standing-seam metal roof.
- T-shaped dairy barn, c. 1850 and later (contributing building) A large and rambling building, composed of nine distinct sections, and mostly of frame construction.
- Harvestore Silo (non-contributing structure)
- two Cement Silos (contributing structures)
- Vehicle Garage (non-contributing building)
- Shed-roofed bam, c. 1920 (contributing building)
- Shed-roofed Vehicle Bam (non-contributing building)

=== 4183 State Route 203 ===
4183 State Route 203 (c. 1840) is a "One and one-half story frame dwelling with linear footprint and rear shed-roofed addition; façade has five-bay fenestration pattern with center entrance. Exterior has clapboard siding; roof is covered with standing-seam metal." Its separate garage is non-contributing.

=== 4193 State Route 203 ===
4193 State Route 203. (c. 1906) (contributing building) "One-story wood frame educational building with symmetrical plan. The building is covered with a gable-on-hip main roof, surmounted by a small cupola, and has a hip-roofed projecting pavilion centered on the facade, which contains the primary entrance. The exterior is fitted with clapboard with corresponding corner boards and the roof is covered with standing-seam metal; the cornice is boxed and molded and below it is an unmolded fascia. Windows include single and paired openings fitted with six-over-six sash; the double-leaf entrance doors are spanned by a leaded-glass transom, and sheltered beneath a shed-roofed porch sustained by slender Ionic order colonettes."

- Playground (contributing structure)

=== 4197 State Route 203 ===
4197 State Route 203. (c. 1800-1928 & later contributing building) "One and one-half story gable-roofed frame dwelling, consisting of the original south section, to which was added ca. 1928 a north section to form a T-shaped footprint. The form and roof pitch of the original section strongly are indicative of an early construction date, possibly prior to ca. 1800; as presently constituted that section of the house is accessed via a side entrance on the east gable end, which additionally includes five small windows (three in the gable field), all fitted with six-over-six sash. A hipped-roof porch is located where this section and the north section meet. The building has clapboard siding and a standing-seam metal roof, and the older south section has attenuated wood cornices and associated remms. The door into the south section from the east gable is spanned by a broken pediment sustained by fluted pilasters. The dwelling includes an apartment added ca. 1928."

- Automobile Garage. "North Chatham Fire House". c. 1926 (contributing building)

This building was formerly the original North Chatham Fire House. It is a single-story, gable-front building with outward-swinging glazed and paneled doors, exposed rafter tails at the eaves, and novelty siding. It was later modified to function as an automobile service shop and later a garage.

- Automobile Garage (non-contributing building) A two-bay garage constructed, in part, from a reconstituted barn frame.

=== North Chatham Free Library ===
The North Chatham Free Library, at 4287 State Route 203, is likely an important element of the community, but its not-very-historic building, constructed in 1958 and extended in 1995, caused it to be deemed a resource that is "non-contributing" to the historic character of the district. It is a one-story wood frame building with vinyl siding and a low gable roof. "A one-story addition was built at the west side of the building in 1995, its character and finishes in keeping with the original library building. There is a one-story wood entrance porch at the east entrance, a wood frame ramp for accessibility and a wood stair corresponding with the west entrance."

=== North Chatham Post Office & Library ===
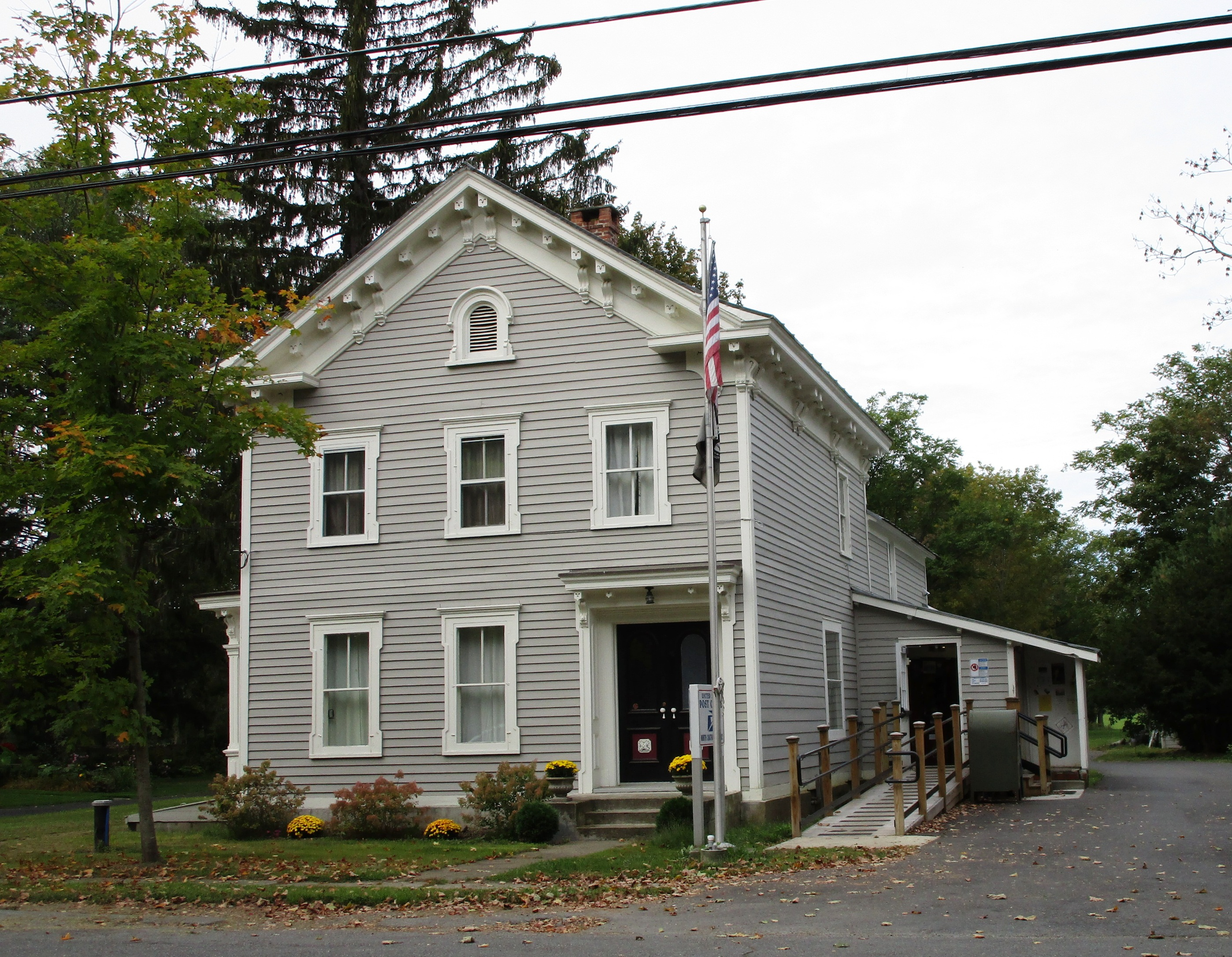
Post office

1889 (contributing building) "This building was used in other village locations until moved here in 1914 to serve as the library; a restoration was completed in 2007. It is a one-story wood-frame building with gable roof, and vertically-oriented, corrugated-metal siding and roof There are double-hung wood windows with segmented-arched heads windows on the north and south facades with sawn finials. There is a covered entrance porch with a frame, elliptical-arched roof The east entrance, which is partially glazed, is likely original. The interior has been restored (2007) and features wood floor boards, vertically oriented corrugated-metal wainscot and painted sheetrock walls above."

includes

- Eisenbower Memorial Garden. 2000 (non-contributing structure) A circular-shaped memorial flower and shrub garden sited immediately to the west of the main library.
- Wigwam frame, c. 2009 (non-contributing structure) Wood-frame wigwam structure at west side of property constructed using local saplings and reconstructed 2011.
- Wood Library Sign (non-contributing structure)
- Painted wood library sign installed c. 2010 by a local Eagle Scout.

== East side of NYS 203 ==
Selected properties on the east side, going from north to south, are:

=== 4176 State Route 203 ===
4176 State Route 203. (c. 1840 & later) (contributing building) "One and one-half story frame dwelling, end gabled, with wings on the north and south sides. Fa9ade is five bays in width and symmetrically composed with a center entrance; five frieze band windows are aligned above the five bays corresponding with the first story; larger windows in the main block employ a combination of two-over-two and six-over-six sash. The center portion of the facade is spanned by a hipped-roof porch of Italianate-style conception with perforated and scroll-sawn ornament. The exterior is clad with aluminum and the roof is covered with standing-seam metal. Building does not appear on maps prior to 1872 and may have been moved here from a previous location, as its form suggests a date well prior to map documentation. The south end of the house, which once contained an office, now houses an apartment." The property also includes:

- Carriage Barn, c. 1840 & later (contributing building) Gable-front frame building with a small shed-roofed extension on north side; the exterior has wood clapboard siding with a raised-seam metal roof Two overhead garage doors currently provide access to the interior.
- Wood Fence (non-contributing structure)"

=== 4188 State Route 203 ===
4188 State Route 203. (c. 1870 & later) is a "Two-story frame gable-ended dwelling with enclosed front porch, enclosed north entry, and rear lean-to corresponding with the basement level. The building has clapboard siding and a standing-seam metal roof The facade is symmetrically composed with five bays and a center entrance. Windows are fitted with two-over-two wood sash. Exterior treatments are austere and all-but lacking in stylistic references."

The district includes three former school buildings. "The former school building at 4193 State Route 203. built ca. 1906, displays stylistic tendencies also equated with the Colonial Revival and Neoclassical modes and was the last educational facility bruit for North Chatham school children prior to the centralization of schools. Its design is indicative of the new standards of school design for educational facilities by this date, as espoused in sources such as the 1899 book Modern American School Buildings by W.R. Briggs. It is interesting to note that two earlier predecessors were both reused; the ca. 1841 school is subsumed within the barn complex associated with the Bradley Nichols house, while the 1871 North Chatham School was moved and refitted as a carriage barn [at] 4263 State Route 203."

=== North Chatham United Methodist Church ===
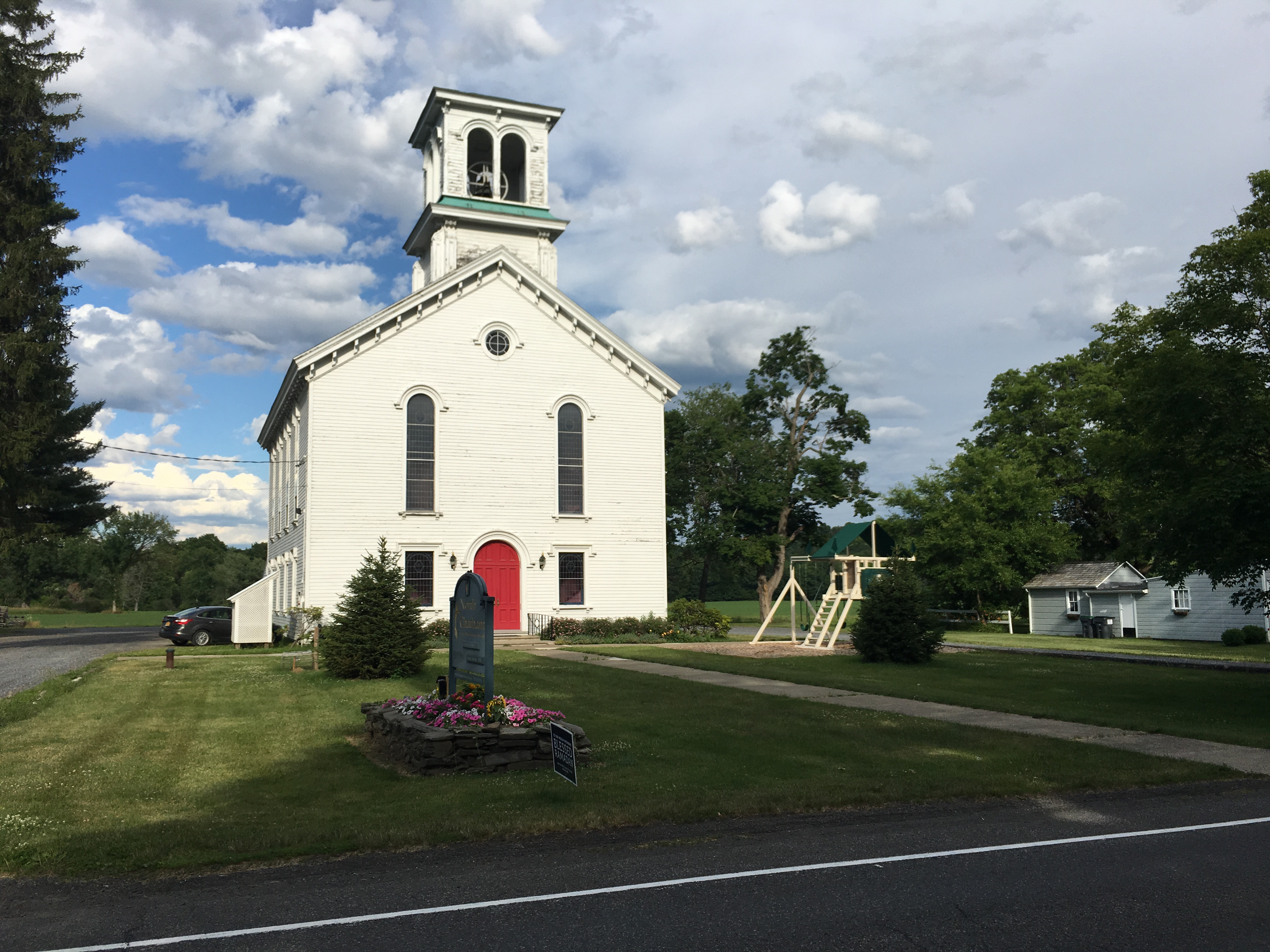
North Chatham Methodist Church

4263 State Route 203, built c. 1834-36, 1867. On its property is also an 1871-built carriage barn which was the North Chatham School.

"4263 State Route 203. Methodist Episcopal Church. c. 1834–1836, 1867 and c. 1900 (contributing building) Two-story wood frame dwelling with fully-pedimented facade with layered detailing including original late Federal style and subsequent Italianate and Colonial Revival style finishes. The building has self-contained massing and was built on a rectangular-shaped footprint, the ridge of its medium-pitched roof aligned with the longer north and south flank elevations. A Late Victotian-era wrap-around porch is present on the facade and is carried round the north elevation. The main roof is covered in standing-seam metal and there are two brick chimneys, one each on the north and south roof slopes. The house is clad in vinyl siding with exposed wood trim and eave details, including a bracketed and denticulated frieze and molded comice. A decorative elliptical-shaped motif is featured in the tympanum of the pediment. The primary^ door is Italianate in style and features double-leaves with round-arched heads. There is a colored-glass casement window centered on the second floor, flanked by tripartite windows with central one-over-one sash bordered by narrower colored glass in a diamond-pane pattern; windows hung with one-over-one wood sash windows throughout, with one colored-glass casement window present at the center of the second floor east. The porch is sustained by paired Tuscan-order wood colonettes and has a standing-seam metal roof. A Colonial Revival-style porch supported on two Tuscan-order wood colonettes is present at the center of the south elevation." The property also includes:

- Carriage Barn. "North Chatham School". 1871 (contributing building) One and one-half story wood-frame building with steeply pitched gable roof, clapboard siding, wood trim and deep rake frieze board at the gable ends. The windows are double-hung with six-over-six sash and appear original to the building. The interior space includes some interior finish, including beadboard wainscoting on the first floor. There is an interior brick stove chimney supported near the ceiling, at the west end of the building. The school was moved to this position from just north of the location of the dwelling." Also on the property are:
- Garden Shed c. 1871 (contributing structure) "This shed is a portion of the former school cited above; it was by all indications the entrance/cloak room."
- Solar Panels (non-contributing structure)"

=== 4204 NYS 203 ===
The house at 4204 NYS 203, built c. 1845, is a one-and-a-half-story gable-front building with Greek Revival details that include corner pilasters, moulded wood cornice returns and a raking cornice,.

"frame dwelling with side hall plan and rear wing. Building has Greek Revival-style detailing including corner pilasters with capitals; molded wood cornice returns and raking cornice; eared window surrounds; a trabeated entrance frontispiece with pilasters and corresponding entablature; and, on the south elevation, a hipped-roof porch with square piers or antae, beneath which is a shallow bay window. The building has clapboard siding and the roof, excepting the porch, is clad with asphalt. An interior beam is inscribed with the date 1845 and the name 'W.T. Rock.'"

Two contributing buildings behind are a c. 1900 outhouse and a c. 1835 carriage barn. The latter is a "frame gable-front building with novelty siding and paired vertical-board sliding doors". This is directly visible from NYS 203.

=== Mill yard ===
Behind 4204 NYS 203 is a mill yard which was "the industrial core" of North Chatham. In the 2012 document this is described as being off Mill Lane, but in 2019 there is no signage, and the lane appears to be private driveway running back behind 4204 NYS 203 which, in 2019 Google Streetview has no signage and would appear to be a private driveway. In 2012 or before it was known as Mill Road. The cider mill and adjacent feed store, seen in photo #17 of accompanying photos, is likely not clearly visible or identifiable from NYS 203.

"The district likewise includes the nineteenth-century industrial core of North Chatham, a mill yard which capitalized on hydraulic power first harnessed from the Valatie Kill ca. 1798, and which [in 2012] contains a cider mill, saw mill, and a nineteenth century commercial building."

=== Cider Mill ===
"The Cider Mill is a remarkable resource given the survival of the building in largely intact form with the bulk of its mechanical systems intact. It was likely built in the last quarter of the nineteenth century, ca. 1880, and is one of three buildings which remain to document North Chatham’s mill yard. It retains its original form, consisting of a larger section where the actual processing was effected, and a smaller wing with drive-through which contained the mill’s business office. Though suffering the effects of deferred maintenance the building is nevertheless substantially intact and both architecturally and historically significant. Among the features which remain within are a truck scale balance, a cider processing vat, a cider press, along with chutes and belt-driven gears. As for the adjacent .Saw Mill, it appears to have been rebuilt after multiple fires, the last of which occurred in the first decade of the nineteenth century. It is a long, low building, and is also suffering the effects of deterioration. The building's framing suggests that it may represent two periods, though accounts suggest it was destroyed by fire in the 1860s and again in 1908. The upper story was built with dimensional lumber and is of the platform frame type. The lower story, however, was erected with a heavy square-ruled oak frame, circular sawn, with double bracing. The use of diminished housings for the tie beams is unusual and more characteristic of earlier scribe-rule joinery. Unlike the cider mill, most of the infrastructure has since been removed, with only the envelope of the building remaining for interpretive purposes."

== South end of district ==
Off Dorn Rd. at the south end (not the first Dorn Rd. which dead-ends where a bridge used to be, but the second one coming off 17?) of the district is:

- "A few agricultural buildings bear noting, among them the main timber-frame section of the barn located in the farmstead off of Dorn Road, which is by all indications the earliest of the farm's various agricultural structures. The barn features an asymmetrical three-bay interior plan; it was built with a swing-beam indicating its potential relationship with grain processing and was in part constructed with massive hand-hewn oak timbers. Its placement over a banked foundation was likely subsequent to its initial construction and done in order to shelter sheep or other livestock; it was later yet substantially aggrandized in association with a large dairy operation."
- "Also of note is the three-bay or English barn on the property to the west; it features the characteristic flank entries of this barn type, and was built with a square-rule frame composed of sawn timbers. It too remains in a farm complex that came to full development later, in association with the dairying industry."

== Other ==
The district was listed on the National Register of Historic Places in 2012.

"North Chatham" is signed on NYS 203 at 42.46592°N 73.63365°W coming from the south, before County Road 17 goes off to the right.
