= Spengler Bridge =

- U.S. National Register of Historic Places
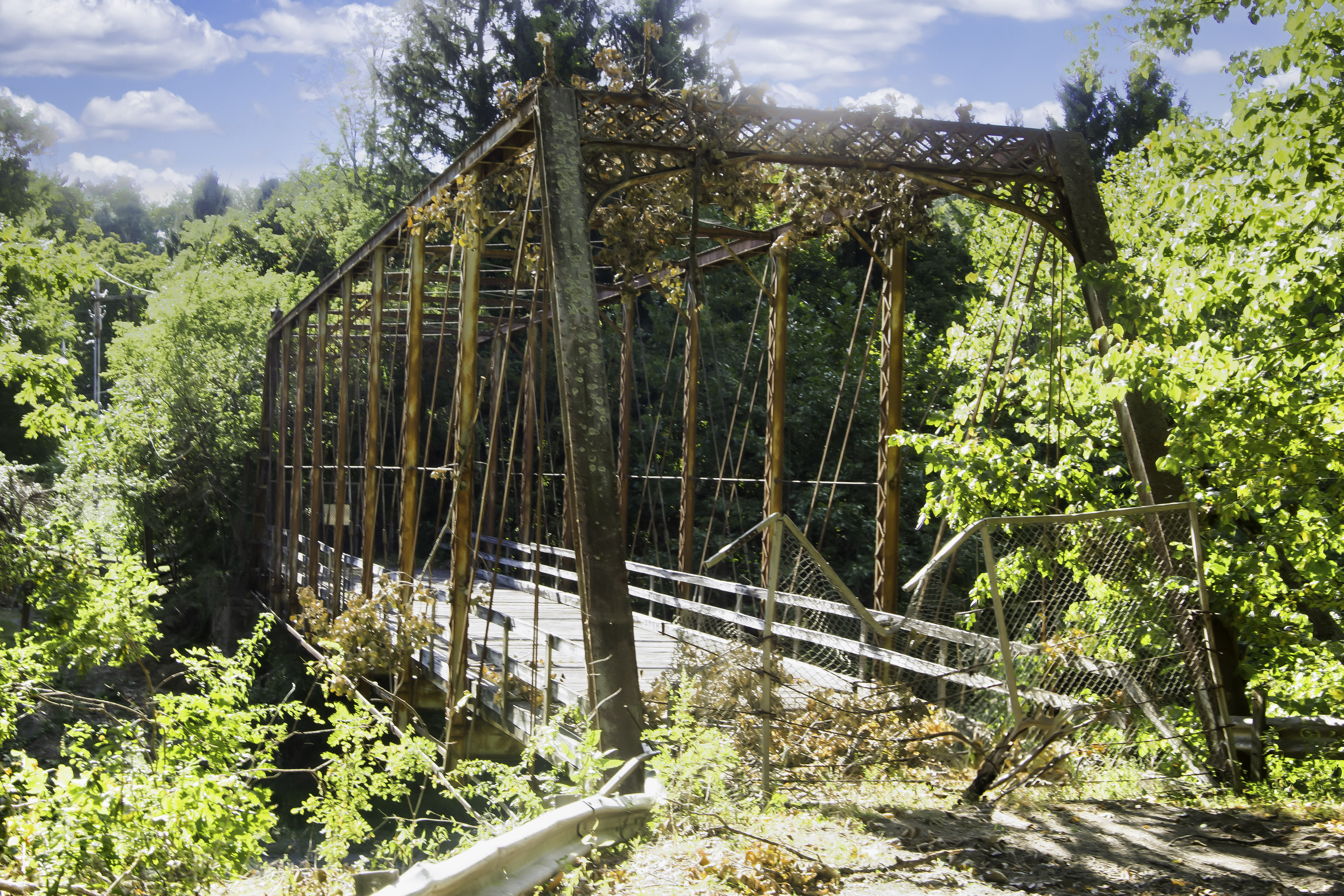

- Location within New York Location within the United States
- Nearest city: Chatham, New York
- Coordinates: 42°25′51″N 73°35′59″W
- Area: less than one acre
- Built: 1880
- Architect: Morse Bridge Co.
- Architectural style: Pratt truss
- NRHP reference No.: 73001172
- Added to NRHP: February 23, 1973

Spengler Bridge, named after Henry Cones Spengler (26 Feb 1847 - 25 Aug 1911), Chatham County Highway Commissioner, is a historic Pratt Truss bridge located at Chatham in Columbia County, New York. It was built in 1880 by the Morse Bridge Company of Youngstown, Ohio. It is composed of two Pratt trusses with counters, each 138 feet in length. It measures 16 feet wide and crosses the Kinderhook Creek.

It was added to the National Register of Historic Places in 1973.
