= William H. Tobey =

American politician

William Henry Tobey (1799 Hudson, Columbia County, New York – May 1878) was an American lawyer, banker and politician from New York.

== Life ==
He studied law, was admitted to the bar in 1820, and practiced in New Lebanon. He was a member of the New York State Assembly (Columbia Co.) in 1838; Surrogate of Columbia County from 1841 to 1845; and a member of the New York State Senate (11th D.) in 1862 and 1863.

He was a Director of the National Bank of Kinderhook from 1839; and President of the National Union Bank of Kinderhook from 1853 until his death.

== Sources ==
- The New York Civil List compiled by Franklin Benjamin Hough, Stephen C. Hutchins and Edgar Albert Werner (1870; pg. 265, 315 and 443)
- Biographical Sketches of the State Officers and the Members of the Legislature of the State of New York in 1862 and '63 by William D. Murphy (1863; pg. 111ff)
- The New York State Register by Roger Sherman Skinner (1830; pg. 157)
- The Village of Kinderhook by Capt. Franklin Ellis, transcribed at US Gen Net

New York State Senate
Preceded by John H. Ketcham	New York State Senate; 11th District; 1862–1863	Succeeded by John B. Dutcher
