= Silvernail Homestead =

Historic house in New York, United States

- U.S. National Register of Historic Places
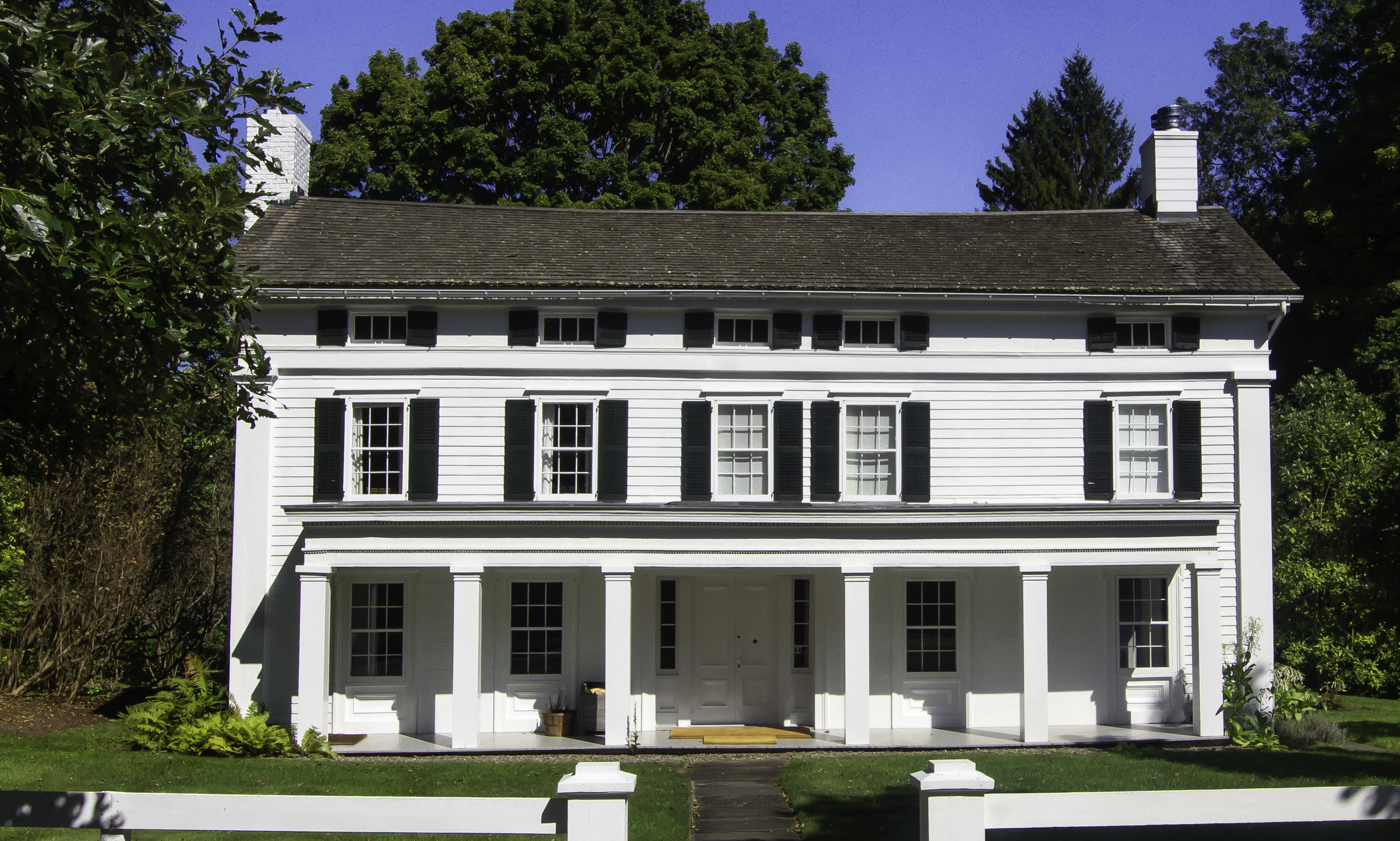

- Location within New York Location within the United States
- Nearest city: 383 Poole Hill Rd., Ancram, New York
- Coordinates: 42°1′8.45″N 73°37′10.86″W
- Area: 11.39 acres (4.61 ha)
- Built: 1800
- Architectural style: Greek Revival
- NRHP reference No.: 10000332
- Added to NRHP: June 11, 2010

Silvernail Homestead is a historic home located at Ancram in Columbia County, New York and Pine Plains, Dutchess County, New York. It is an L-shaped building with a main block, with rear lean-to and ell. The main block is a 2 1/2-story, five-by-two-bay structure with a gable roof in the Greek Revival style. It features a single-story entrance porch with six restored Doric order piers. It has been occupied by five generations of the Silvernail family.

It was listed on the National Register of Historic Places in 2010.
