= The Wilbor House =

Historic house in New York, United States

- U.S. National Register of Historic Places
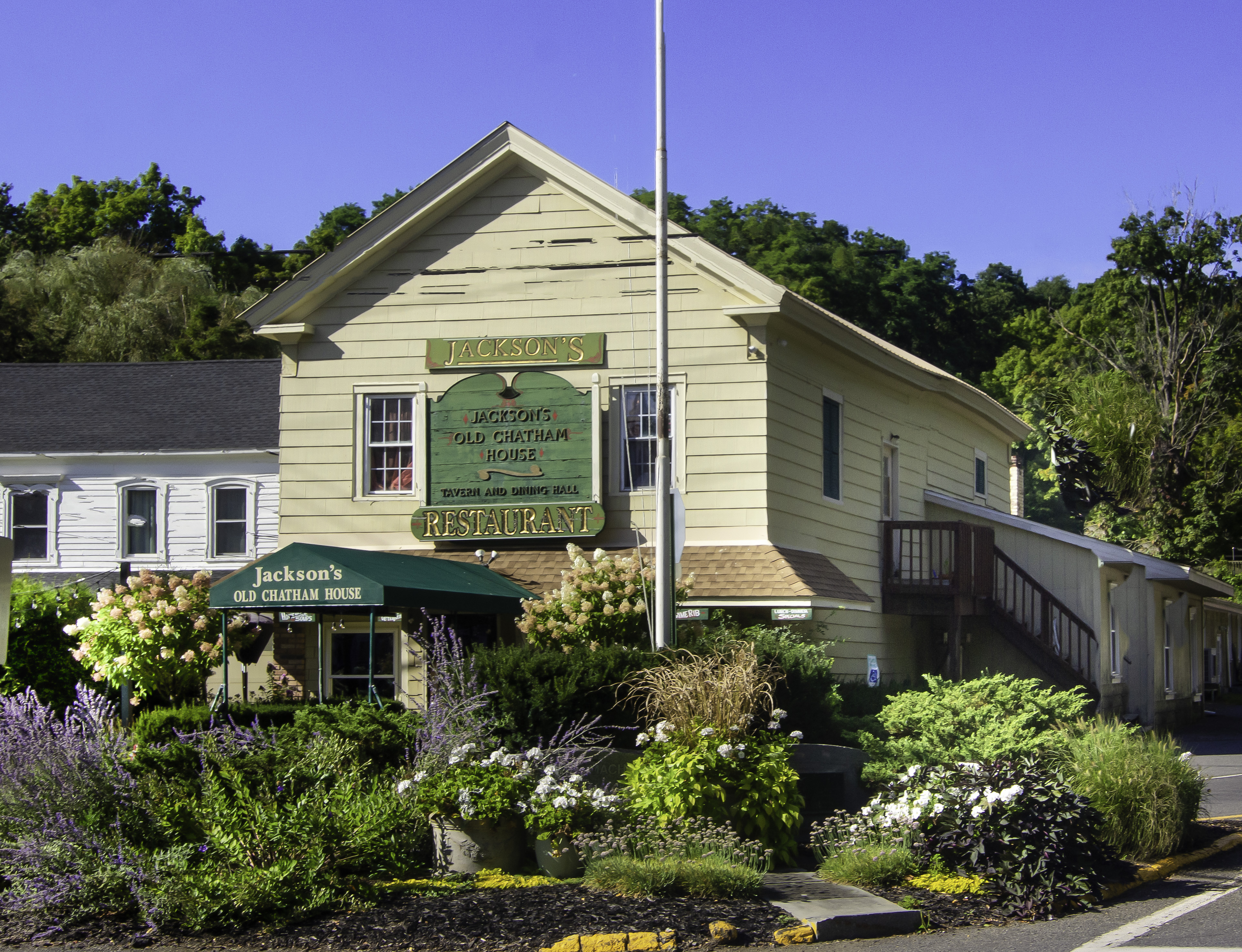

- Location within New York Location within the United States
- Location: 0.25 mi. NE of jct. of I-90 and Thorne Rd., Old Chatham, New York
- Coordinates: 42°26′43″N 73°33′35″W
- Area: 1.9 acres (0.77 ha)
- Built: 1790
- Architectural style: Early Republic, Federal
- NRHP reference No.: 97000567
- Added to NRHP: June 30, 1997

The Wilbor House, also known as The Thompson Farm, is a historic home located at Old Chatham in Columbia County, New York. It was built in around 1790 and is a two-story, five by two bay, heavy timber frame dwelling on a raised fieldstone foundation. It is topped by a medium pitched gable roof. The house has a one-and-one-half-story wing, with a single-story wing extended from it.

It was added to the National Register of Historic Places in 1997.
