= St. John's Lutheran Church (Ancram, New York) =

Historic church in New York, United States

- U.S. National Register of Historic Places
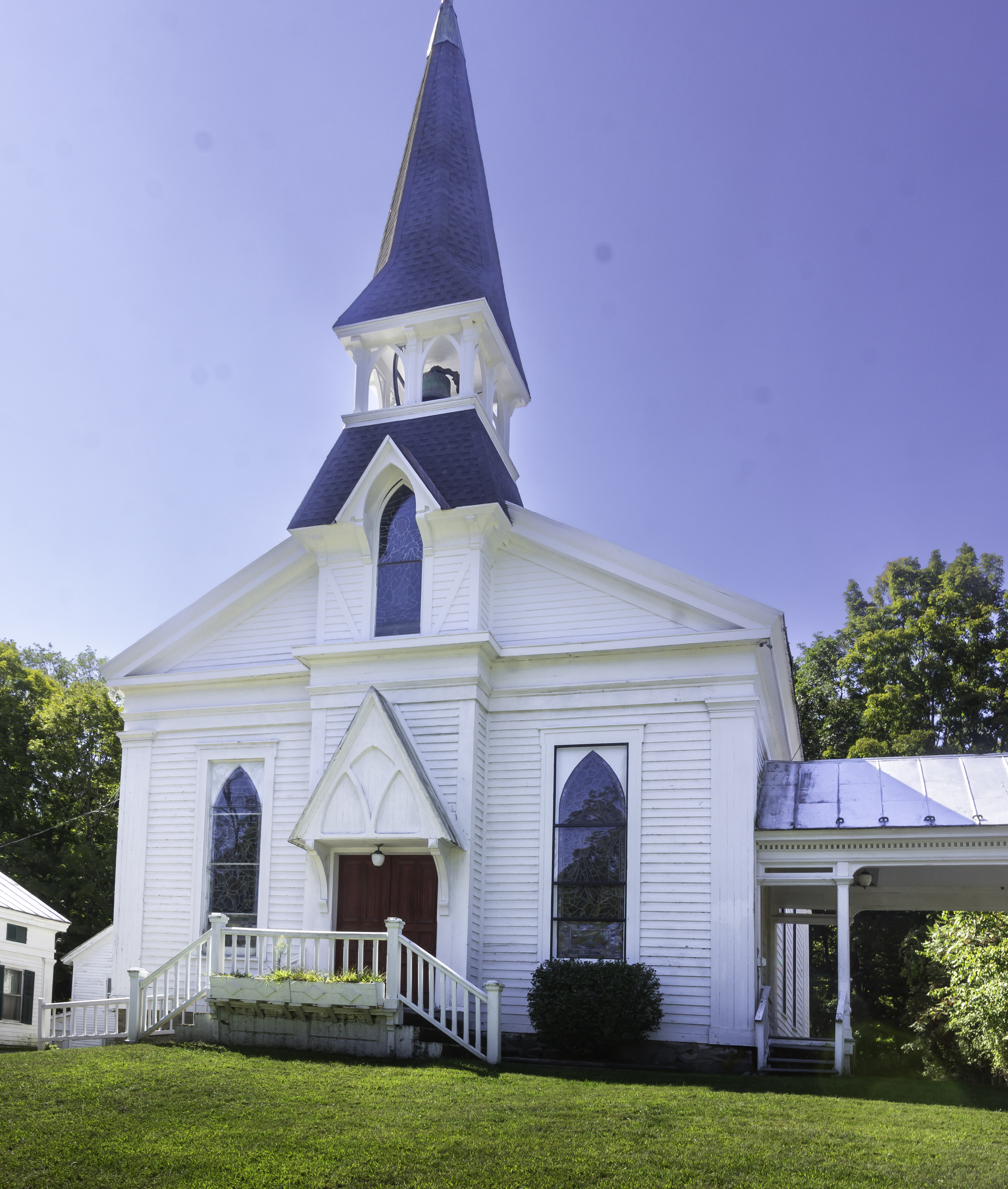

- Location within New York Location within the United States
- Nearest city: 1273 Co. Rte. 7, Ancram, New York
- Coordinates: 42°2′58.32″N 73°38′19.07″W
- Area: 1 acre (0.40 ha)
- Built: 1847
- Architectural style: Greek Revival
- NRHP reference No.: 09000480
- Added to NRHP: June 30, 2009

St. John's Lutheran Church is a historic Lutheran church complex located at Ancram in Columbia County, New York. The complex includes the church, parsonage (ca. 1853), 19th century horse sheds, and church hall (ca. 1910). The church was built in 1847 and is a rectangular, heavy timber frame meeting house that received major modifications in 1854, 1886, and 1906. It is sparsely decorated in Greek Revival style. The current bell tower was added in 1886.

It was listed on the National Register of Historic Places in 2009.
