= Blinn-Pulver Farmhouse =

Historic place in eastern New York state

- Blinn--Pulver Farmhouse
- U.S. National Register of Historic Places
- Location within New York Location within the United States
- Location: 219 Hudson Ave., Chatham, New York
- Coordinates: 42°20′57″N 73°36′14″W
- Area: 4.8 acres (1.9 ha)
- Built: 1814
- Architectural style: Federal
- NRHP reference No.: 03000025
- Added to NRHP: February 12, 2003

Blinn-Pulver Farmhouse is a historic farmhouse in Chatham, New York on Route 66. Gail Blass Wolczanski, of the Chatham Village Historical Society, is working on restoring the run-down farmhouse. The restored farmhouse will be called Historical Society Education Center with a museum, archives, and a library. The farmhouse was added to the National Register of Historic Places in 2003 as Blinn—Pulver Farmhouse.
