= North Chatham, New York =

- Hamlet
- Location within New York Location within the United States
- Coordinates: 42°28′19″N 73°37′54″W
- Country: United States
- State: New York
- County: Columbia
- Elevation: 351 ft (107 m)
- Time zone: UTC-5 (Eastern (EST))
  - Summer (DST): UTC-4 (EDT)
- ZIP code: 12132
- Area codes: 518 & 838
- GNIS feature ID: 958742

North Chatham is a hamlet in Columbia County, New York, United States. The community is located along New York State Route 203 3.2 miles (5.1 km) south-southwest of Nassau and 4.9 miles (7.9 km) north-northeast of Valatie. North Chatham has a post office with ZIP code 12132.

Most or all of the hamlet is included in the North Chatham Historic District, which is listed on the National Register of Historic Places.
