= Old Chatham, New York =

- Hamlet
- Location within the state of New York
- Coordinates: 42°26′37″N 73°33′33″W
- Country: United States
- State: New York
- County: Columbia
- Town: Chatham
- Time zone: UTC-5 (Eastern (EST))
  - Summer (DST): UTC-4 (EDT)
- ZIP code: 12136
- Area code: 518

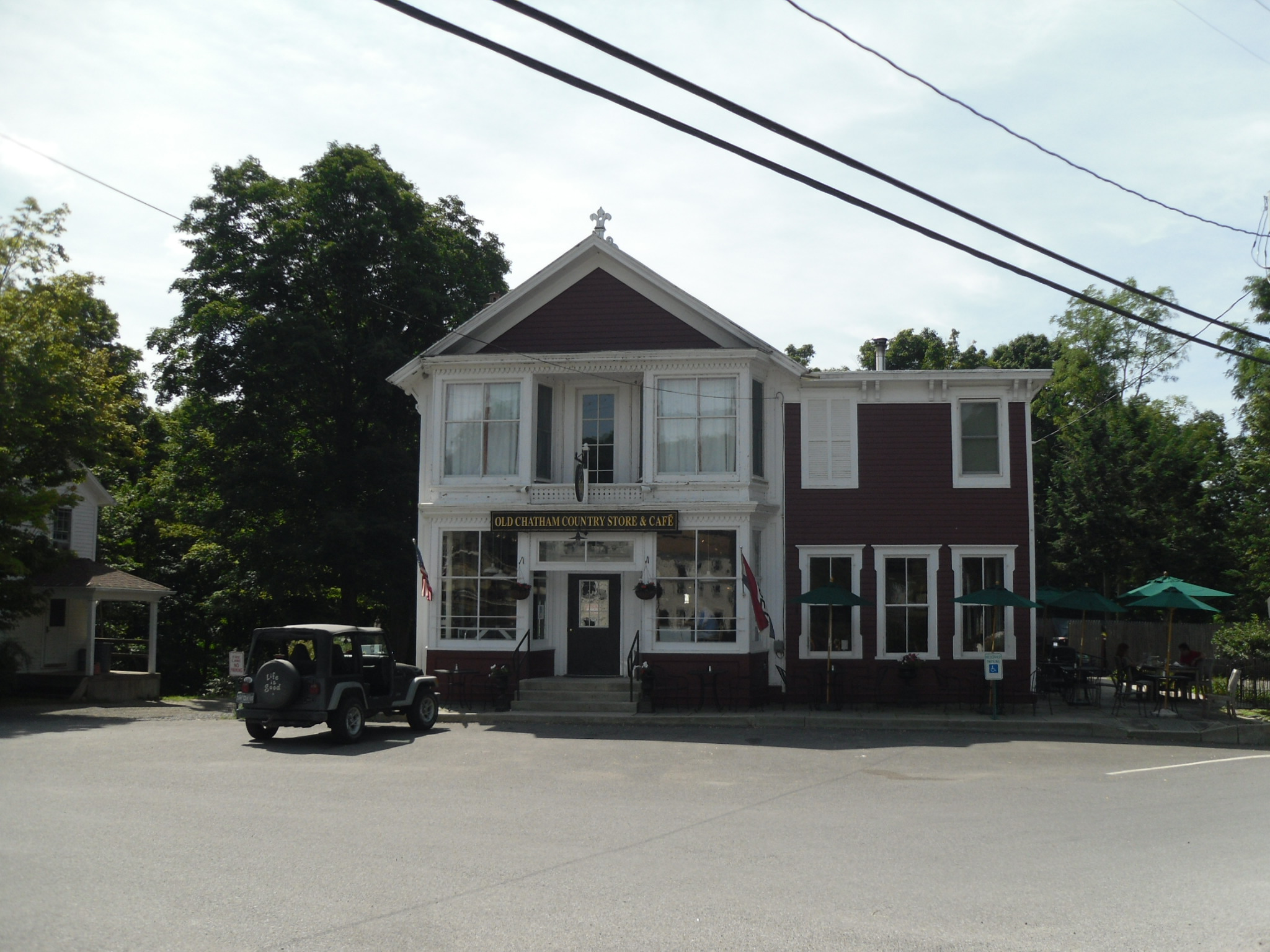
Old Chatham Country Store.

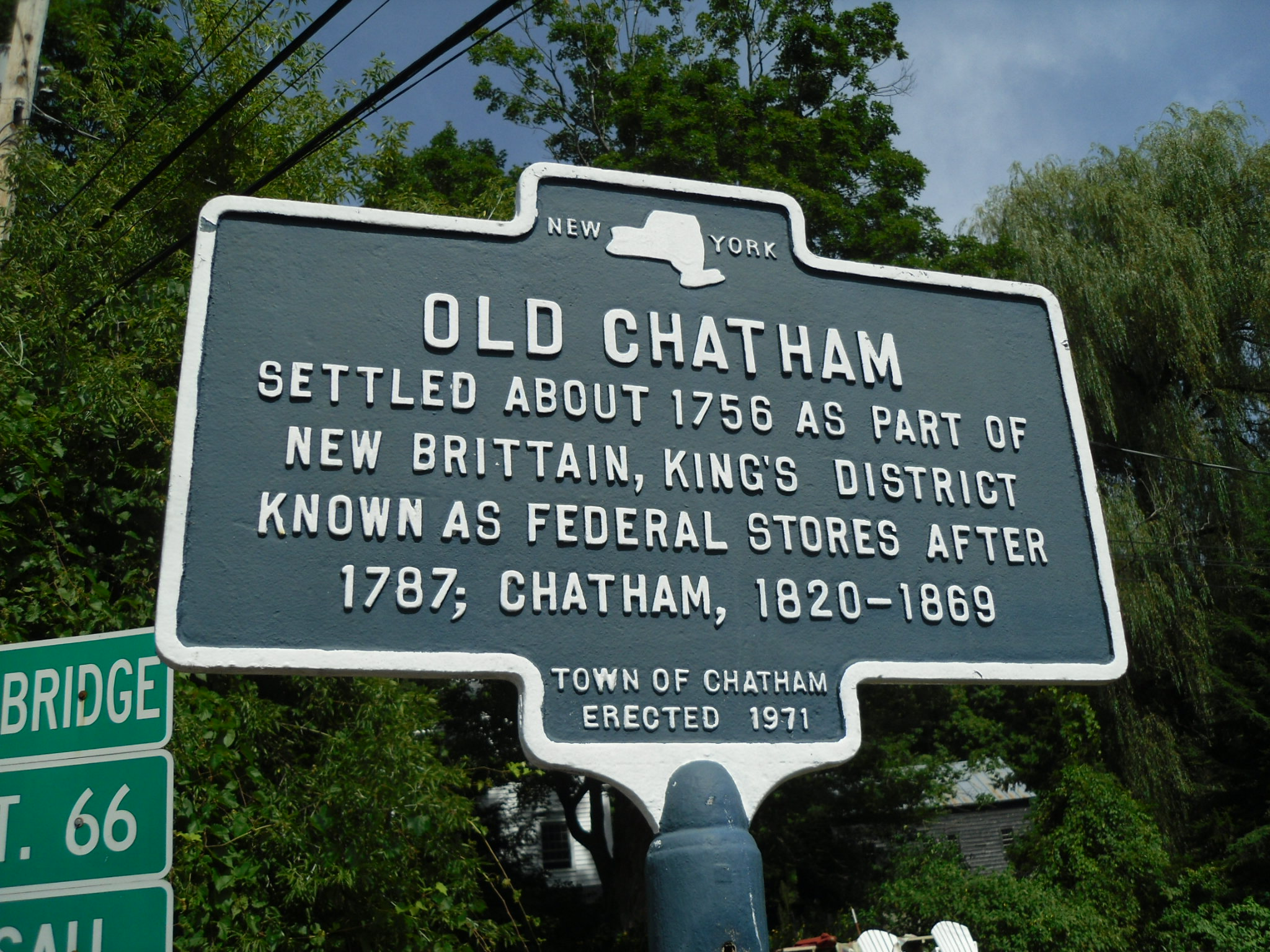
Old Chatham Sign.

Old Chatham is a hamlet in the northeastern quadrant of the town of Chatham, located in Columbia County, New York, United States. It is one of the earliest settlements in the town and was originally named Chatham.

The center of Old Chatham is marked by a few businesses around the intersection of the Albany Turnpike and County Rt. 13. These businesses include the United States Post Office for area code 12136, the Old Chatham Country Store (which includes a cafe/restaurant), and Jackson's Old Chatham House (another restaurant). The Old Chatham Sheepherding Company is also located in Old Chatham. The Wilbor House, also known as The Thompson Farm, was added to the National Register of Historic Places in 1997. Old Chatham is also the headquarters of Blass Communications. The town hosts a parade and sing-along that attracts over 1,000 people annually.
