= Valatie, New York =

- Village
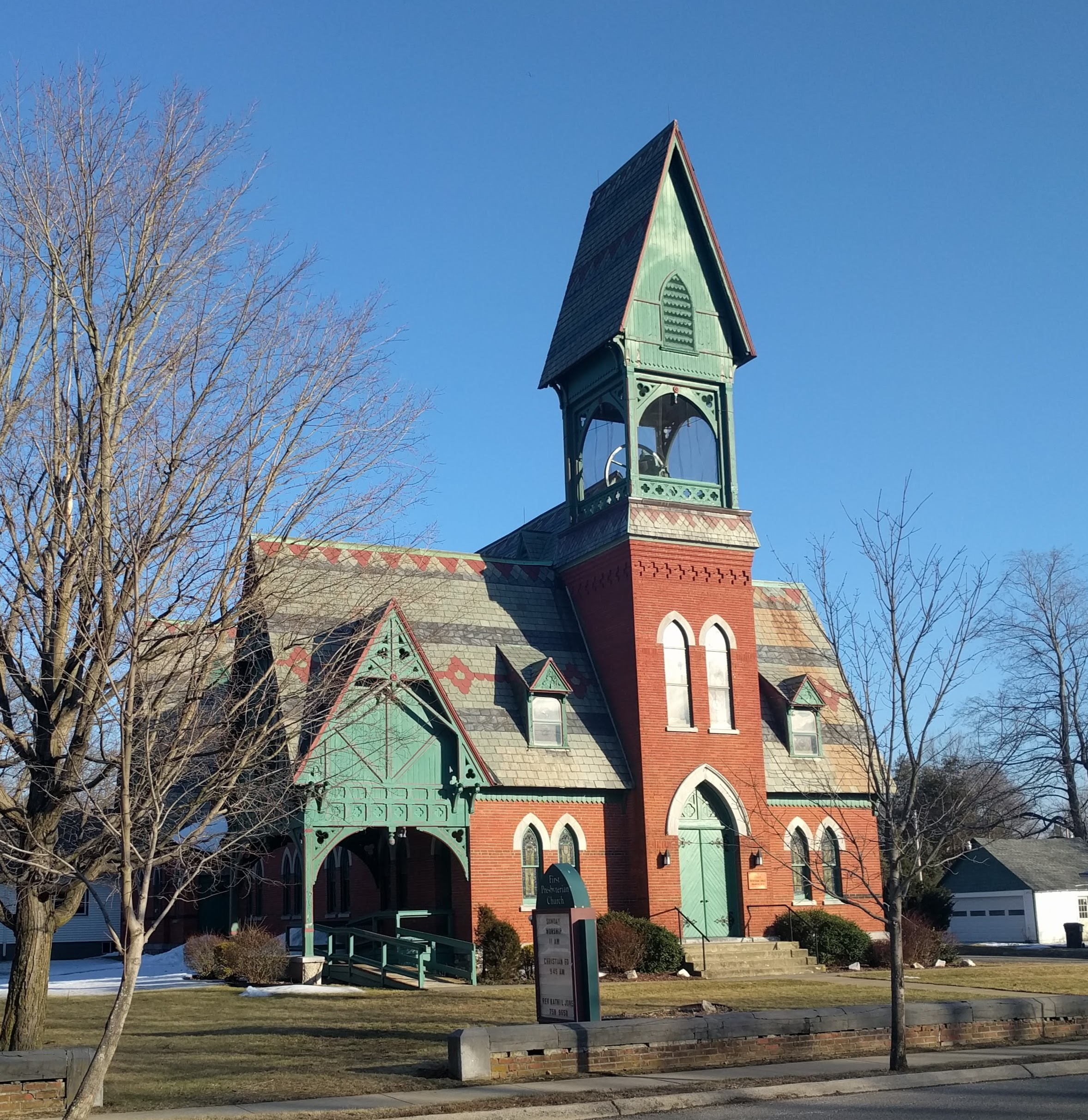
- The First Presbyterian Church is listed on the National Register of Historic Places

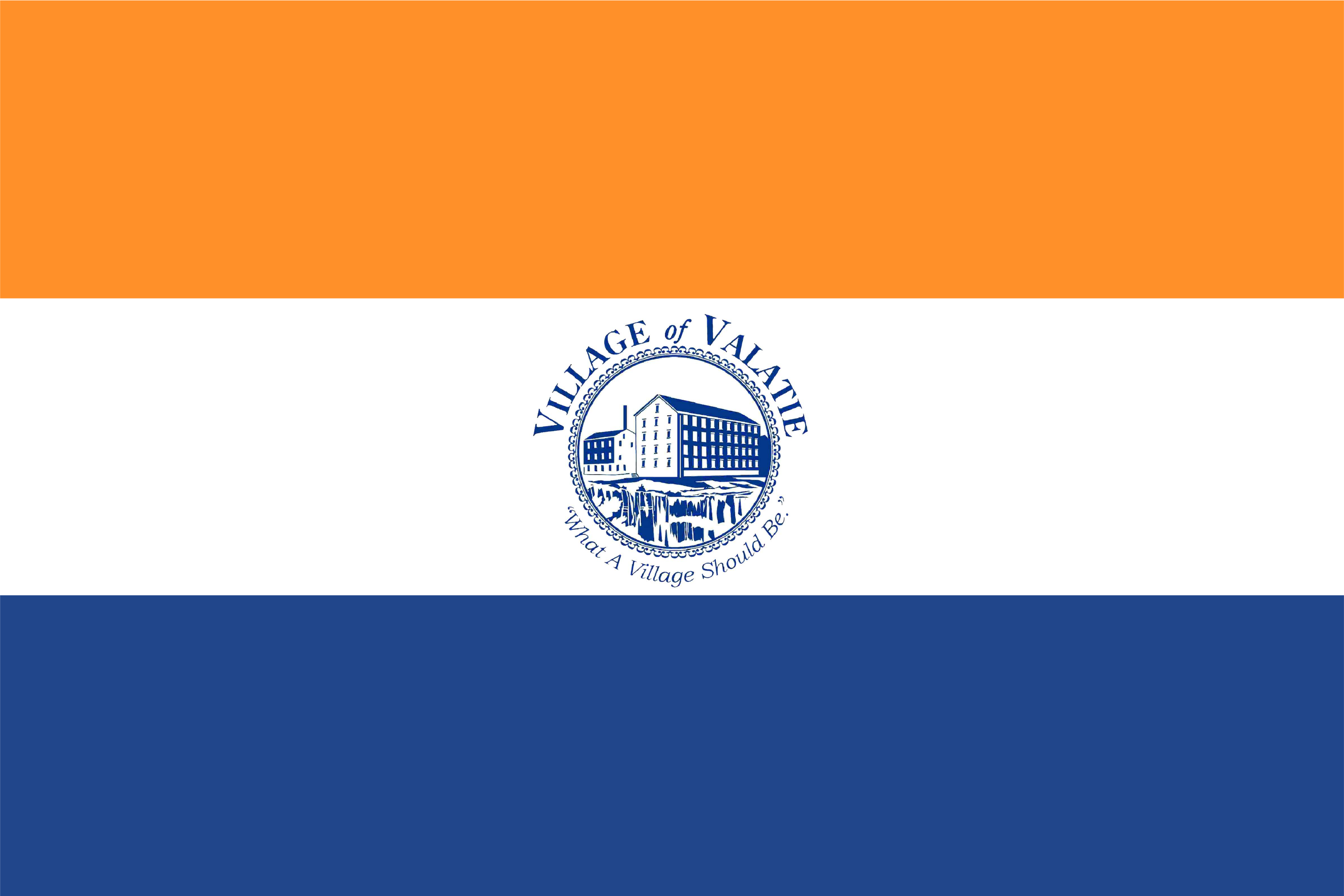
- Flag
- Nickname: Vaaltje ("Little Falls")
- Motto: "What a Village Should Be"
- Location of Valatie, New York
- Coordinates: 42°24′50″N 73°40′39″W
- Country: United States
- State: New York
- County: Columbia
- Town: Kinderhook
- Settled: 1665

Area
  - Total: 1.27 sq mi (3.28 km^{2})
  - Land: 1.25 sq mi (3.25 km^{2})
  - Water: 0.012 sq mi (0.03 km^{2})
- Elevation: 240 ft (73 m)

Population (2020)
  - Total: 1,785
  - Density: 1,423/sq mi (549.5/km^{2})
- Time zone: UTC-5 (Eastern (EST))
  - Summer (DST): UTC-4 (EDT)
- ZIP code: 12184
- Area code: 518
- FIPS code: 36-76617
- GNIS feature ID: 0968342
- Website: www.valatievillage.com

Valatie (/vəˈleɪʃə/; və-LAY-shə) is a village in Columbia County, New York, United States. The population was 1,785 at the 2020 census. The village is at the center of the town of Kinderhook on US 9.

== History ==
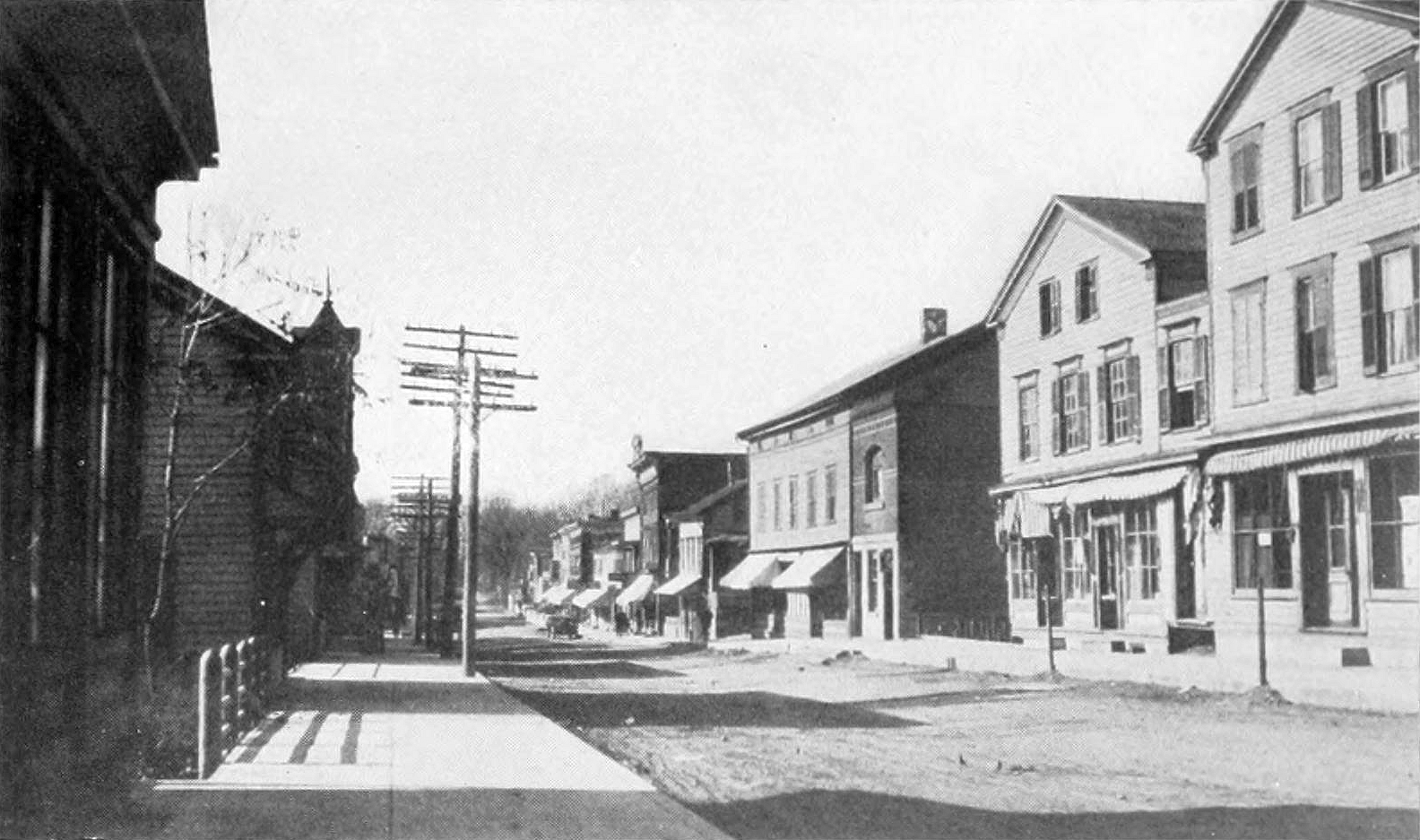
Main Street, Valatie, 1914

Part of the original New Netherland, the first European settlers were the Dutch who settled Kinderhook around 1665, and named this area "Valletje", meaning "little falls". The first post office was established in 1832. By the early 19th century there were nine cotton mills in Valatie operating on power derived from the famous waterfalls; the village was incorporated in 1856. With a bustling Main Street, Valatie was considered the center of commerce in northern Columbia County throughout the 19th century.

The United States' first Santa Claus Club was founded in Valatie in 1946 by fifteen village veterans to provide holiday gifts for several critically ill children. Every Christmas Eve, a parade his held with Santa and Mrs. Claus driving though the village. Following the parade, a Santa travels throughout the village, personally visiting every child ten and under to give them presents.

== Geography ==
Valatie is located in the center of the Town of Kinderhook in northern Columbia County. It is part of the Hudson Valley region of New York State. It is 21 miles (34 km) south of Albany, the state capital, and 15 miles (24 km) northeast of Hudson.

According to the United States Census Bureau, the village has a total area of 1.27 square miles (3.28 km^{2}), of which 1.25 square miles (3.25 km^{2}) is land and 0.01 square miles (0.03 km^{2}), or 0.95%, is surface water. The village is located at the juncture of Valatie Kill with Kinderhook Creek, a tributary of the Hudson River. There are three waterfalls in the village, all along Main Street: Valatie Kill Falls/Wild's Falls, Little Falls Creek/Beaver Mill Falls, and Kinderhook Creek.

=== Nearby communities within the Town of Kinderhook ===
- Niverville – A hamlet south of Kinderhook Lake on County Road 28 and New York State Route 203, 2 miles (3 km) northeast of Valatie.
- Kinderhook – A village on U.S. Route 9, 2 miles (3 km) southwest of Valatie.

== Demographics ==
Historical population
Census	Pop.	Note	%±
1880	1,775		—
1890	1,437		−19.0%
1900	1,300		−9.5%
1910	1,219		−6.2%
1920	1,301		6.7%
1930	1,246		−4.2%
1940	1,208		−3.0%
1950	1,225		1.4%
1960	1,237		1.0%
1970	1,288		4.1%
1980	1,620		25.8%
1990	1,487		−8.2%
2000	1,712		15.1%
2010	1,819		6.3%
2020	1,785		−1.9%
U.S. Decennial Census

As of the 2010 census, the total population of Valatie was 1,819. The population density was 1,388.3 inhabitants per square mile (536.0/km^{2}). There were 627 housing units at an average density of 508.4 per square mile (196.3/km^{2}). The racial makeup of the village was 93.84% White, 2.14% Native American, 1.37% African American, 0.49% Asian, 0.35% from other races, and 1.70% from two or more races. Hispanic or Latino of any race were 10.23% of the population.

Valatie's median household income was $60,365 in 2006-2010 and has grown by 36.03% since 2000. The income growth rate is higher than the state average rate of 24.79% and nearly twice the national average rate of 19.17%. The per capita income for the village was $16,650. About 7.94% of families and 8.68% of the population were below the poverty line, including 13.0% of those under age 18 and 15.6% of those age 65 or over.

There were 584 households, out of which 36.8% had children under the age of 18 living with them, 49.0% were married couples living together, 12.3% had a female householder with no husband present, and 33.9% were non-families. 28.3% of all households were made up of individuals, and 14.4% had someone living alone who was 65 years of age or older. The average household size was 2.51 and the average family size was 3.09.

In the village, the population was spread out, with 24.4% under the age of 18, 4.8% from 18 to 24, 27.5% from 25 to 44, 19.5% from 45 to 64, and 23.8% who were 65 years of age or older. The median age was 41 years. For every 100 females, there were 80.6 males. For every 100 females age 18 and over, there were 73.6 males.

== Arts and culture ==
Festivals include Winter Walk parade, MomFest, JoanFest, Oktoberfest, Fall Festival, and Food Truck Nights.

The First Presbyterian Church, Wild's Mill Complex, and Nathan Wild House are listed on the National Register of Historic Places.

The Valatie Free Library was founded in 1928 as a casual circulation of books. It was incorporated in 1931 and moved to a 600-square-foot (56 m^{2}) 19th-century cottage.

The Valatie Community Theater, located on Main Street was originally opened as a movie house in 1926, but closed in 1970 when there was a downturn in the local economy due to the remaining textile mills closing. The theater was reopened in 2004 as the Valatie Community Theater, a not for profit group that showcases theater and music.

The Valatie Santa Claus Club visits each child ten and under in the village and delivers presents.

== Education ==
It is in the Kinderhook Central School District (Ichabod Crane).

== Parks ==
Volunteer Park- Location of the Little League fields

Beaver Cotton Mill Overlook- A scenic spot overlooking the Beaver Mills waterfall on the Kinderhook Creek

Village Square- A manicured Park located in the center of the village across from the Martin H. Glynn Municipal Building.

River Street Park- A wooded park containing walking trails

Pachaquack Preserve- 41 acres of preserved land with walking trails

Little Falls Park- A new park that is in progress as of 2026. Located in the Little Falls neighborhood.

== Media ==
- Haldane of the Secret Service (1924), directed by and starring Harry Houdini, was filmed at Beaver Kill Falls in Valatie.
- Meskada (2009) was filmed partially in Valatie.

== Notable people ==
- Martin H. Glynn, 40th Governor of New York, from 1913 to 1914, was born in the Town of Kinderhook in 1871, and shortly thereafter moved with his family to Valatie, where his family operated Glynn Tavern on Main Street.
- Virginia O'Hanlon, her 1897 letter to the New York Sun asking whether there really was a Santa Claus was the inspiration for the 1947 film, Miracle on 34th Street; the editorial response by the NY Sun to her letter has become one of the most popular holiday quotes, "Yes, Virginia, there is a Santa Claus". Virginia O'Hanlon Douglas retired and spent her final years in Valatie and is buried in the nearby village of Chatham.
