= New York State Route 203 =

Highway in New York

New York State Route 203
- Map of eastern New York with NY 203 highlighted in red and NY 980B in blue

Route information
- Maintained by NYSDOT
- Length: 22.95 mi (36.93 km)
- Existed: 1930–present

Major junctions
- East end: NY 22 in Austerlitz
- Taconic State Parkway in Chatham town; NY 66 in Chatham village; US 9 in Valatie
- North end: US 20 in Nassau

Location
- Country: United States
- State: New York
- Counties: Columbia, Rensselaer

Highway system
- New York Highways; Interstate; US; State; Reference; Parkways
← US 202	→ NY 204

New York State Route 203 (NY 203) is a state highway in the Capital District of New York in the United States. It begins at an intersection with NY 22 in the Columbia County hamlet of Austerlitz and ends at a junction with U.S. Route 20 (US 20) in the Rensselaer County village of Nassau. NY 203 was assigned as part of the 1930 renumbering of state highways in New York. Prior to that time, the section of NY 203 east of Valatie was part of NY 22. The road runs northwest-southeast, and is signed east-west east of Valatie and north-south north of Valatie.

== Route description ==
NY 203 begins at an intersection with NY 22 in the town of Austerlitz. NY 203 proceeds northwest and downtown into the hamlet of Spencertown. Spencertown consists of several homes situated around the intersection of NY 203 and Fire Hill Road. The two-lane route winds its way west through the town of Austerlitz, passing through woods and residences for several miles. At the intersection with Jugway Road, NY 203 bends northwest, entering a large hamlet at the intersection with County Route 7 (CR 7; South Street). Residences surround NY 203 as it heads northeast, before starting to space north of Goodrich Lane. The route winds its way to the northwest, becoming more rural as it enters an intersection with CR 9 in the hamlet of Moorhouse Corner.

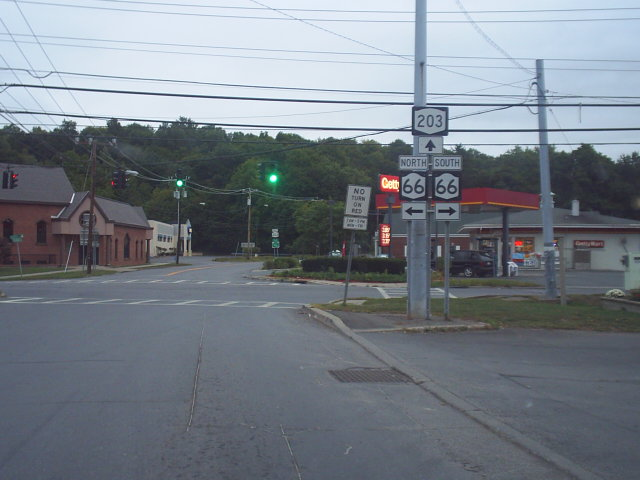
NY 203 at the junction with NY 66 in Chatham

Still in the town of Austerlitz, NY 203 bends northwest from CR 9 and enters a partial cloverleaf interchange with the Taconic State Parkway before intersecting with CR 61 (Hogel Hill Road) nearby. After CR 61, NY 203 makes a dart to the southwest into the town of Ghent, running around a hillside before turning northwest into the village of Chatham. In Chatham, NY 203 gains the moniker of Coleman Street, intersecting with NY 66 (Hudson Avenue), where it changes names to Church Street. Proceeding west through Chatham, the route becomes a two-lane commercial and residential strip before leaving the village for Ghent once again.

Out of Chatham, NY 203 drops the Church Street moniker, winding its way northwest along a freight line into the town of Chatham. In the town of Chatham, NY 203 bends northwest then west as it becomes more rural. A short distance later, NY 203 intersects with CR 21B in the town of Kinderhook. At CR 21B, NY 203 winds northward through Kinderhook as a two-lane rural roadway, bending northwest at a junction with Merwin Road. NY 203 proceeds west, passing north of Winding Brook Country Club and soon into the village of Valatie. In Valatie, NY 203 gains the moniker of Chatham Street, proceeding north as a two-lane residential street.

After crossing Kinderhook Creek in the middle of the village, NY 203 enters downtown Valatie, intersecting with Main Street, which proceeds westward to connect with US 9. NY 203 however proceeds eastward along Main, crossing an intersection that leads to CR 28A (Upper Main Street). NY 203 proceeds north on Mechanic Street, a two-lane commercial street in the northeastern corner of the village. At Church Street, the route bends northeast, leaving downtown Valatie and soon back into the town of Kinderhook. In Kinderhook, NY 203 becomes a two-lane residential street, passing southeast of the hamlet of Valatie Corner and into a junction with CR 28 (Main Street / Newton Hill Road).

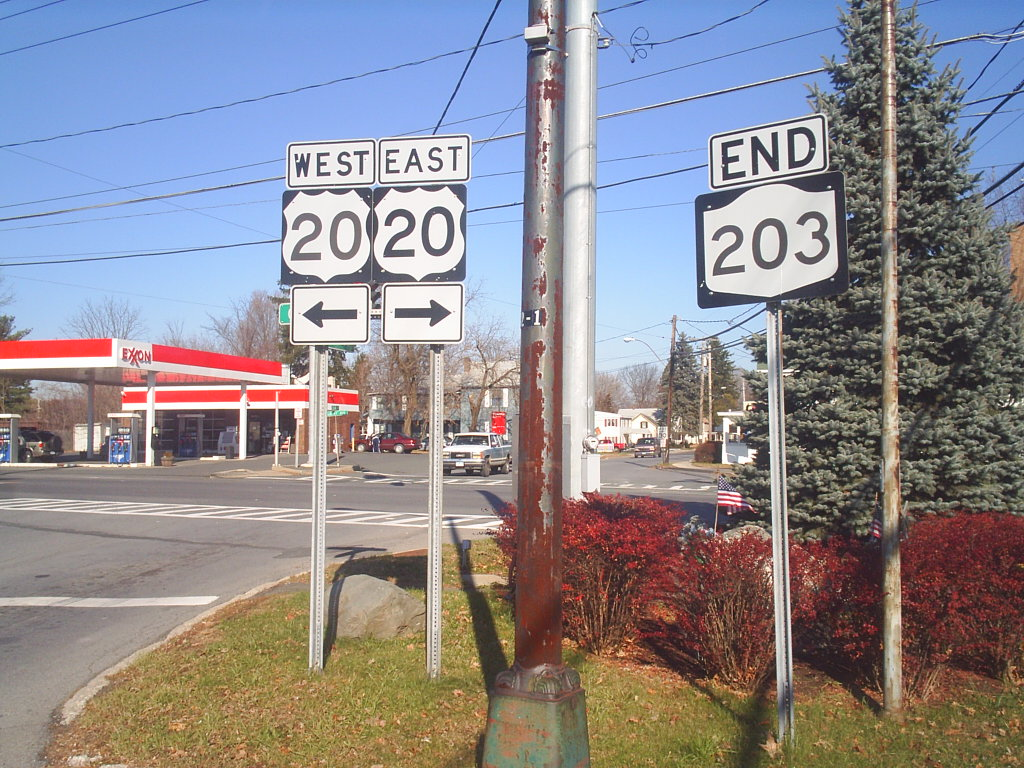
The northern terminus of NY 203 at US 20 in Nassau

After CR 28, NY 203 bends northeast, crossing under the freight line and running along the eastern side of Niverville. After Niverville, NY 203 crosses back into the town of Chatham, passing along the eastern shore of Kinderhook Lake as a two-lane residential street. The route bends away from the lake, soon bending northeast into a junction with CR 17. At CR 17, NY 203 bends northward into the hamlet of North Chatham. In North Chatham, NY 203 is a two-lane residential strip, intersecting with CR 32 at the north end of the hamlet. At CR 32, NY 203 darts northeast, intersecting with another segment of CR 32 before turning north and crossing the county line into Rensselaer County.

After crossing the county line, NY 203 crosses under the Berkshire Spur of the New York State Thruway (I-90) in the town of Nassau. Beyond the Thruway, NY 203 continues northward, crossing and re-crossing the Valatie Kill. The route passes the Nassau-Schodack Cemetery and several residences as it bends northeast, eventually entering the village of Nassau. In Nassau, NY 203 has the moniker of Chatham Street, becoming a two-lane residential strip before intersecting with US 20 (Albany Avenue / Church Street). This junction serves as the northern terminus of NY 203.

== History ==
In 1908, the New York State Legislature created Route 1, an unsigned legislative route extending from New York City to Albany along the eastern fringe of New York. Route 1 mostly followed what is now NY 22 from New York City to Austerlitz, where it turned west and continued to Valatie on modern NY 203. The route left NY 203 at Main Street and continued to Albany on current US 9. When the first set of posted routes in New York were assigned in 1924, most of legislative Route 1 south of NY 23 in Hillsdale became NY 22. The remainder of old Route 1 between Hillsdale and Valatie became part of an extended NY 22 in the late 1920s.

NY 22 was realigned as part of the 1930 renumbering of state highways in New York to continue north from Austerlitz to the Canadian border near Mooers by way of the eastern edge of the state. Most of NY 22's former routing between Valatie and Austerlitz became part of NY 203, a new route extending from Austerlitz to Nassau via Valatie. The short segment of former NY 22 along Main Street in Valatie from Kinderhook Street (US 9) to Chatham Street (NY 203) did not receive a designation and is now NY 980B, an unsigned reference route.

== Major intersections ==
County	Location	mi	km	Destinations	Notes
Columbia	Austerlitz	0.00	0.00	NY 22 to I-90 Toll / Berkshire Connector – Hillsdale, New Lebanon	Eastern terminus
Columbia	Austerlitz	6.72	10.81	Taconic State Parkway – Albany, New York City	Exit 99 on Taconic State Parkway
Columbia	Village of Chatham	8.20	13.20	NY 66 (Hudson Avenue) – Hudson, Chatham	
Columbia	Valatie	14.40	23.17	To US 9 – Albany, Hudson	Access via NY 980B; former NY 22
Rensselaer	Village of Nassau	22.95	36.93	US 20 (Church Street) to I-90	Northern terminus
1.000 mi = 1.609 km; 1.000 km = 0.621 mi
