= David Park =

David Park is the name of:

- David Park (art historian) (born 1952), professor at the Courtauld Institute, London
- David Park (computer scientist) (1935–1990), British computer scientist
- David Park (golfer) (born 1974), Welsh golfer
- David Park (music producer) (born 1983), Korean-American record producer
- David Park (painter) (1911–1960), American painter
- David Park (writer) (born 1953), novelist from Northern Ireland

== See also ==
- David Parks (disambiguation)
- David Parkes (disambiguation)
