= John Rupert Hunt Thouron =

British-American horticulturist and philanthropist

Sir John R. H. Thouron
- Born: John Rupert Hunt Thouron; 10 May 1907; Cookham, Berkshire, England
- Died: 6 February 2007 (aged 99); Hobe Sound, Florida
- Occupation: Horticulturist
- Notable work: Clivia miniata 'Sir John Thouron'
- Spouse: Esther D. du Pont (m. 1953; died 1984)
- Family: William Angerstein (grandfather)

Captain Sir John Rupert Hunt Thouron KBE (10 May 1907 – 6 February 2007) was a British-American horticulturist, landscape gardener, and philanthropist. He endowed the Thouron Award, a scholarship for British and American students at the University of Pennsylvania.

== Personal life ==
Thouron was born in Cookham, Berkshire, England, to a British mother, Amelia Angerstein, and American father, John L. Thouron, from Bryn Mawr, Pennsylvania. His grandfather William Angerstein was an MP and the grandson of Lloyd's of London underwriter John Julius Angerstein. His father, a stockbroker, died in 1914.

== Career ==
During the Second World War, Thouron enlisted in the Gordon Highlanders and then joined the Black Watch. Thouron was later seconded to the Special Operations Executive (SOE) at Bletchley Park, tasked with sending British and European personnel into Nazi-occupied countries to create resistance groups.

He married as his second wife Esther D. du Pont, an heiress from the Du Pont family. In 1960, they created the Thouron Award to promote ties between the United Kingdom and the United States. Thouron was inspired by the camaraderie between British and American troops fighting together in the war and wanted to continue the Special Relationship in peacetime.

The scholarship is awarded to four to six students annually for British students to study at the University of Pennsylvania and for Penn graduates to study at a university in the United Kingdom.

As a landscaper, Thouron nurtured gardens with almost 2,000 varieties of plants at Doe Run, his 220-acre estate and horse farm in Coatesville, Pennsylvania. He was the first to cultivate a clear yellow lily (described as "one of the holy grails of the plant world"), which grows in a vase shape. He also designed the garden at the British ambassador's residence in Washington, D.C.

In recognition of the impact of the Thouron Award, he was appointed a Commander of the Order of the British Empire (CBE) in the 1967 New Year Honours and was knighted in the same order in the 1976 Birthday Honours, for services to Anglo-American relations. Queen Elizabeth II knighted him during her visit in Philadelphia on occasion of the United States Bicentennial.

== Death ==
He died aged 99 at his home in Hobe Sound, Florida.
