= Thouron Award =

Postgraduate scholarship at the University of Pennsylvania

The Thouron Award is a postgraduate scholarship established in 1960 by Sir John R. H. Thouron, K.B.E., and Esther du Pont Thouron. It was created to strengthen the "special relationship" between the United States and the United Kingdom through educational exchange between British universities and the University of Pennsylvania.

Through the program the Thourons sought to develop and continue Anglo-American friendship by ensuring that, in the years to come, a growing number of the citizens of these two countries would have a thorough understanding of their trans-Atlantic neighbours. In the years since its founding, the Thouron Award has sponsored programs of graduate study for more than 650 fellows, known as Thouron Scholars.

Graduates of British universities receive support for up to two years of study – in any degree course – at the University of Pennsylvania, and Penn graduates may study at any university in the U.K. with up to two years of support. The Award pays tuition and a stipend that covers room, board, and such extras as entertainment and travel.

== History ==
In the autumn of 1960, three British students, a geologist, an economist and a landscape architect, began their courses of study at the University of Pennsylvania as the first Thouron Fellows. In 1961, two graduates of the University of Pennsylvania arrived in the United Kingdom, an economist to the London School of Economics and a classicist to Balliol College, Oxford, as the first Fellows from the United States. Since that time over 500 Fellows have been selected.

Thouron Fellows have pursued degrees in a wide variety of fields. British Fellows have studied in all of the graduate and professional schools of the University of Pennsylvania. American Fellows have attended some 53 British educational institutions, with Cambridge, Oxford, and the University of London attracting the majority of the Penn students.

== Thouron Prize ==
The Thouron family has also established a Thouron Prize for Summer Study at Pembroke College in the University of Cambridge for undergraduate students. The award is granted to eight or nine rising juniors and seniors from Harvard, Yale, and Penn, with typically three students selected from each university.

The students receive a full scholarship to travel and spend two months studying at the University of Cambridge in the Pembroke-King's Programme. The Thouron Prize covers the full cost of the program. In addition, recipients are given a seminar series from Sir Roger Tomkys, a former Master of Pembroke College. Competition for the prizes is often fierce, and the universities typically have their own mechanism for initial nomination. Nominees are then passed onto the consideration of members of the Thouron family, who personally hold interviews with all the nominees before coming to a final decision.

The Thouron Prize is sometimes seen as the sophomore/junior analog of the Rhodes or Marshall Scholarships; however, the latter can only be applied to during one's senior year and typically cover two years of graduate study rather than one undergraduate summer.

Similar to the goals of the other British fellowships, the Thouron Prize endeavors to give undergraduates "an understanding of both shared and differing aspects of British and American culture." At least one student who won the undergraduate Thouron Prize later went on to win the graduate Thouron Award as well. At least three Thouron Prize winners have also gone on to win the Rhodes Scholarship.

== Notable Thouron Scholars ==
- Kenneth Baer – Director of communications, Obama’s Office of Management and Budget
- Janice R. Bellace, after earning her undergraduate degree (Bachelor of Science in Economics] from Penn's Wharton School in 1974 and JD in 1977 from Penn Law, she used her Thouron Award (1977 through 1979) to earn M.Sc. in Industrial Relations from the London School of Economics, and has been a Wharton Professor of Legal Studies and Director of Penn's The Huntsman Program in International Studies and Business as well as founding President of Singapore Management University
- Norman Blackwell – Head of the Downing Street Policy Unit
- Francis Campbell – British diplomat
- Jay Clayton, used award from 1988 through 1990 where he received a Bachelor of Arts (promoted to a Master of Arts) in economics from the University of Cambridge; as of August 2025 United States Attorney for the Southern District of New York
- Sir Robert Cooper – British diplomat and political strategist
- Hugh F. Durrant-Whyte – Roboticist
- Jennifer Egan – Pulitzer prize-winning author
- Rick Gekoski – Writer
- Rose George - British journalist and author
- Josh Gottheimer – Author, lawyer, speechwriter, Congressman for New Jersey's 5th congressional district
- Hugh Gusterson – Anthropologist
- Simon Hirst – Former investment banker and CEO of Durlacher Corporation. Current Steering Committee member of Artisan Capital Ventures
- Robert Jenrick - British politician
- Paul Judge - English businessman and political figure; benefactor of Cambridge Judge Business School
- John J. Leonard – MIT professor
- Frank Luntz - used Thouron Award (1984 through 1987) to earn DPhil in campaign technology from University of Oxford and, as of 2020 (after past stints teaching at University of Pennsylvania where Dr. Luntz earned BA in Political Science and Harvard University where he was a fellow at Kennedy School), he is teaching at New York University in United Arab Emirates and Verbum Dei High School in Compton area of Los Angeles and also continues to be political and business pollster
- Terah Lyons – Founding Executive Director of the Partnership on AI
- Justin Marozzi – British travel writer
- Robert McCrum – British journalist and editor
- Sir Michael Jonathan Moritz, KBE – Billionaire Welsh businessman
- Philip Norton, Baron Norton of Louth, Professor at Hull University and member of UK House of Lords
- David C. Parkes – Harvard professor of computer science
- John Quelch – Harvard professor
- Peter Roth, – High Court justice, after being educated at St Paul's School, London, reading history at New College, Oxford, used his Thouron Award (1976 to 1977) to obtain his LLM from the University of Pennsylvania Law School
- Dick Sabot – Economist and Internet pioneer
- Frances Stead Sellers - Journalist at The Washington Post
- Heath Tarbert - Nominee for Assistant Secretary of the Treasury for International Markets and Development for the U.S. (2017)
- Sir David Watson – Oxford professor, principal of Green Templeton College, Oxford
- Bee Wilson – British food writer
