= David Parkes =

David Parkes may refer to:

- David C. Parkes, British-American computer scientist
- David Parkes (footballer, born 1892) (1892–1975), English football player for Sheffield Wednesday and Rochdale
- David Parkes (footballer, born 1950), Irish football player

== See also ==
- David Parks (disambiguation)
