= Mabel Thorp Boardman =

American philanthropist

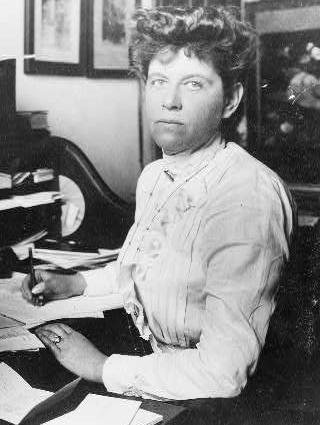

Member of the Board of Commissioners of Washington, D.C.
- In office September 25, 1920 – March 4, 1921
- President: Woodrow Wilson
- Preceded by: William Gwynn Gardiner
- Succeeded by: Cuno Hugo Rudolph

Personal details
- Born: October 12, 1860 Cleveland, Ohio, US
- Died: March 17, 1946 (aged 85) Washington D.C., US
- Resting place: Washington National Cathedral
- Party: Republican
- Occupation: Philanthropist

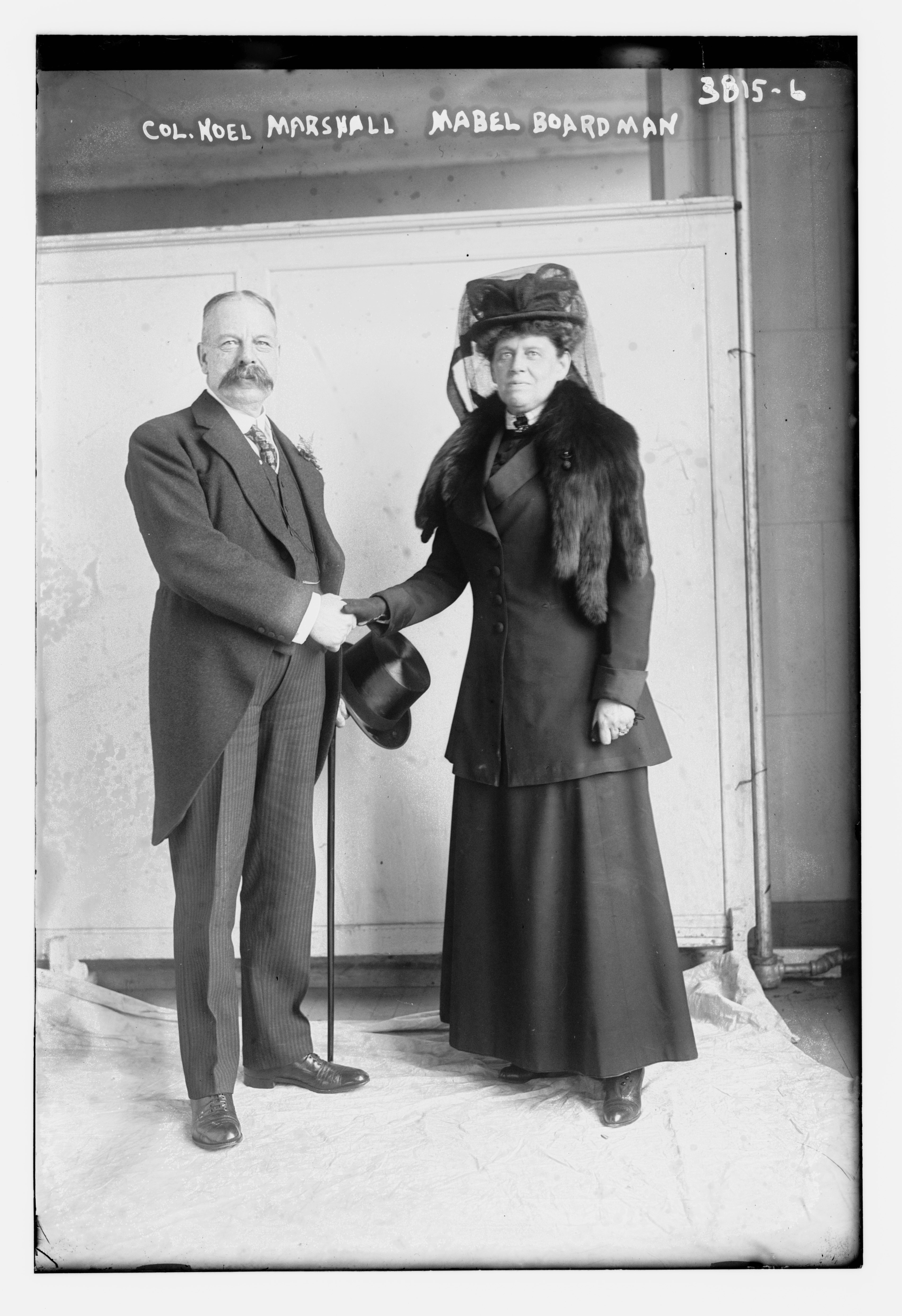
Mabel Thorp Boardman in 1916

Mabel Thorp Boardman (October 12, 1860 – March 17, 1946) was an American philanthropist involved with the American Red Cross. She led the Red Cross in the United States following its receiving congressional charter in 1905 until World War I; however, she did not take up the post of chairman since she believed the organisation would lose credibility with the public. She was the only woman to ever serve on the District of Columbia Board of Commissioners, which was the equivalent of both the Mayor and City Council before home rule. Another woman wouldn't serve in a similar role until Polly Shackleton and Margaret A. Haywood were appointed to the new 9-member council in 1967.

== Biography ==
She was born on October 12, 1860, in Cleveland, Ohio to a well-to-do family. Her father, William Jarvis Boardman (15 April 1832 – 2 August 1915), a lawyer and active in politics, was the grandson of the Senator Elijah Boardman. Her mother, Florence Sheffield, was the granddaughter of Joseph Earl Sheffield, who was a major benefactor of Yale University. She had 5 siblings, including Josephine Porter Boardman Crane. The family moved from Ohio to Washington, D.C., in 1887–1888, although they maintained connections to Ohio politics including a friendship with the Taft family.

As a socialite, she devoted time to many philanthropies. During the Spanish–American War in 1898 she was active in recruiting nurses. In 1901 she was elected to the executive board of the American Red Cross and subsequently led the faction that ousted Clara Barton from the presidency of the organization in 1904.

Barton always took personal charge during major disasters. She gave the illusion of efficiency but was unable to build up a staff she trusted, and her fundraising was lackluster. As a result, she was forced out in 1904, when male professional social work experts took control and made it a model of Progressive Era scientific reform. The new leader was Boardman; she consulted constantly with senior government officials, military officers, social workers, and financiers. William Howard Taft was especially influential. They imposed a new corporate ethos of "managerialism," transforming the agency away from Barton's cult of personality to an "organizational humanitarianism" ready for expansion along increasingly professional lines.

In 1920, President Woodrow Wilson appointed Boardman to be the first and only woman member of the Board of Commissioners of the District of Columbia.

From 1923 until 1944, Boardman served as the Director of the Red Cross's Volunteer Service and overseeing its considerable expansion.

She died on March 17, 1946, of a coronary thrombosis in Washington D.C. She was buried in Washington National Cathedral.

== Legacy ==
There is a Boardman Bay at the Washington National Cathedral.

== Published work ==
- Boardman, Mabel T. Under the Red Cross Flag at Home and Abroad Philadelphia: J. B. Lippincott (1915)

== See also ==
- Sulgrave Club
