= Embassy of the United Kingdom, Washington, D.C. =

British sovereign's diplomatic mission to the United States of America

British Embassy, Washington D.C.
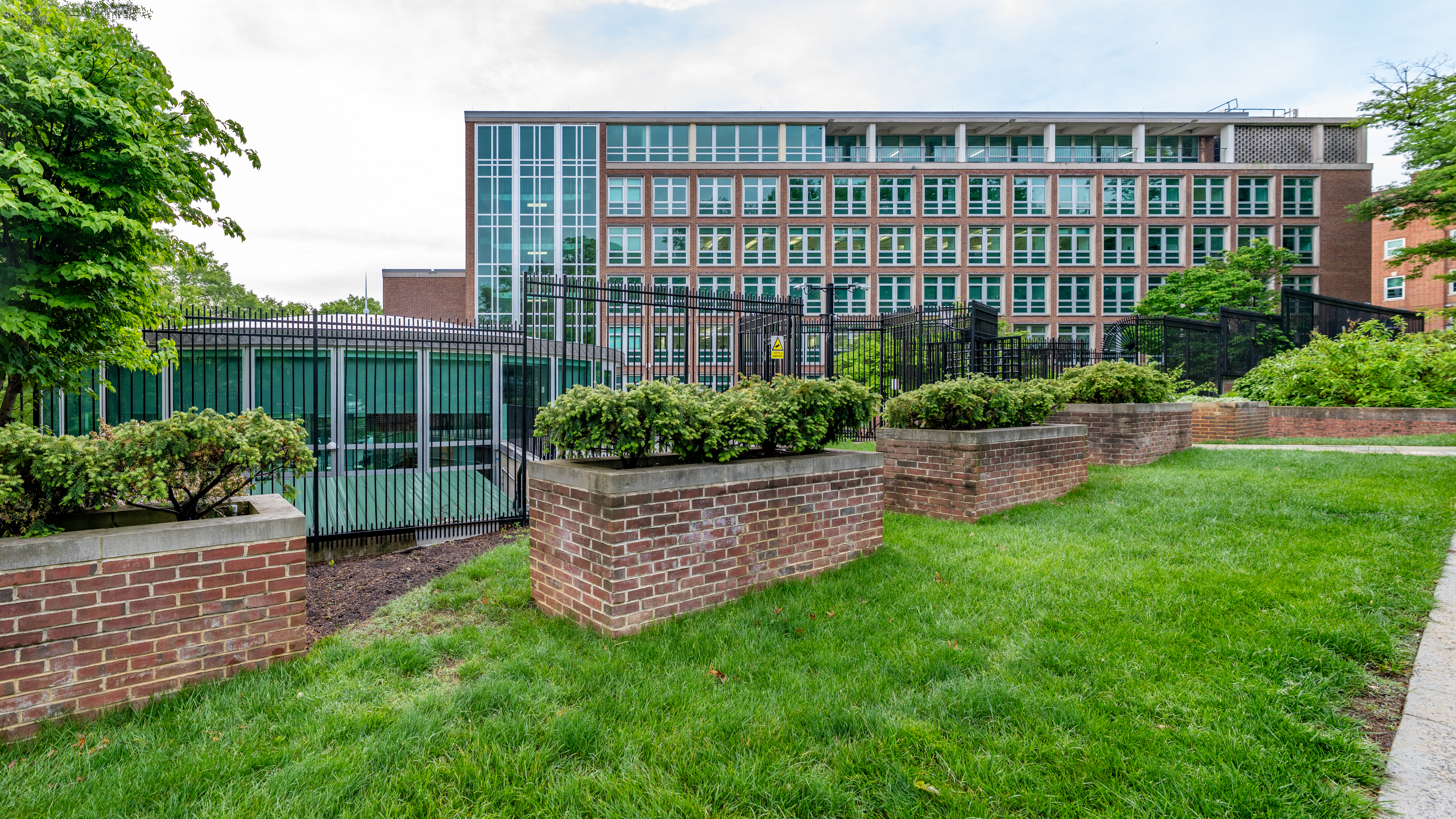
- The "new" chancery, finished 1961
- Location: (United States) Washington, D.C.
- Address: 3100 Massachusetts Avenue, NW
- Coordinates: 38°55′11″N 77°03′40″W
- Ambassador: Sir Christian Turner since 2 February 2026
- Website: www.gov.uk/world/organisations/british-embassy-washington

The embassy's location in Washington, D.C.

The British Embassy, Washington D.C. (alternatively in the US, Embassy of the United Kingdom, Washington, D.C.) is the British sovereign's diplomatic mission to the United States of America, representing the interests of the United Kingdom and British Government. It is located at 3100 Massachusetts Avenue NW in Washington, D.C. The embassy compound includes the chancery offices, as well as the British Ambassador's residence.

== Consulates ==
Outside Washington, the British Foreign, Commonwealth and Development Office (FCDO; often commonly known simply as the Foreign Office) also maintains consulates-general in Atlanta, Boston, Chicago, Houston, Los Angeles, Miami, New York City, and San Francisco, headed by consuls-general. There are also British Consulates called (instead) the UK Government Offices in Denver, and in Seattle, headed by consuls.

== Area ==
The embassy is situated in a compound that includes the ambassador's residence, as well as the old and new chanceries. The residence was designed by Sir Edwin Lutyens to resemble an English country manor, with the old chancery facing the street. By the 1950s, the old chancery was deemed too cramped, and the new chancery, designed by chief architect Eric Bedford was constructed from 1955 to 1961, with Queen Elizabeth II laying the foundation stone on 19 October 1957. Part of the old chancery was converted into staff quarters, and the rest is currently occupied by the offices of the British Council. The British government was the first nation to build an embassy in the area that would later become known as Embassy Row.

Outside the British ambassador's residence stands a statue of Sir Winston Churchill. One of the statue's feet is inside the marked embassy grounds; the other is within the District of Columbia. The embassy's website states that this symbolizes Churchill's Anglo-American parentage (his father was British, his mother American) and his status as an honorary citizen of the United States.

The gardens of the ambassador's residence were planted by Elizabeth Sherman Lindsay. Lady Lindsay was a landscape gardener and wife of Sir Ronald Lindsay, the British ambassador to Washington from 1930 to 1939.

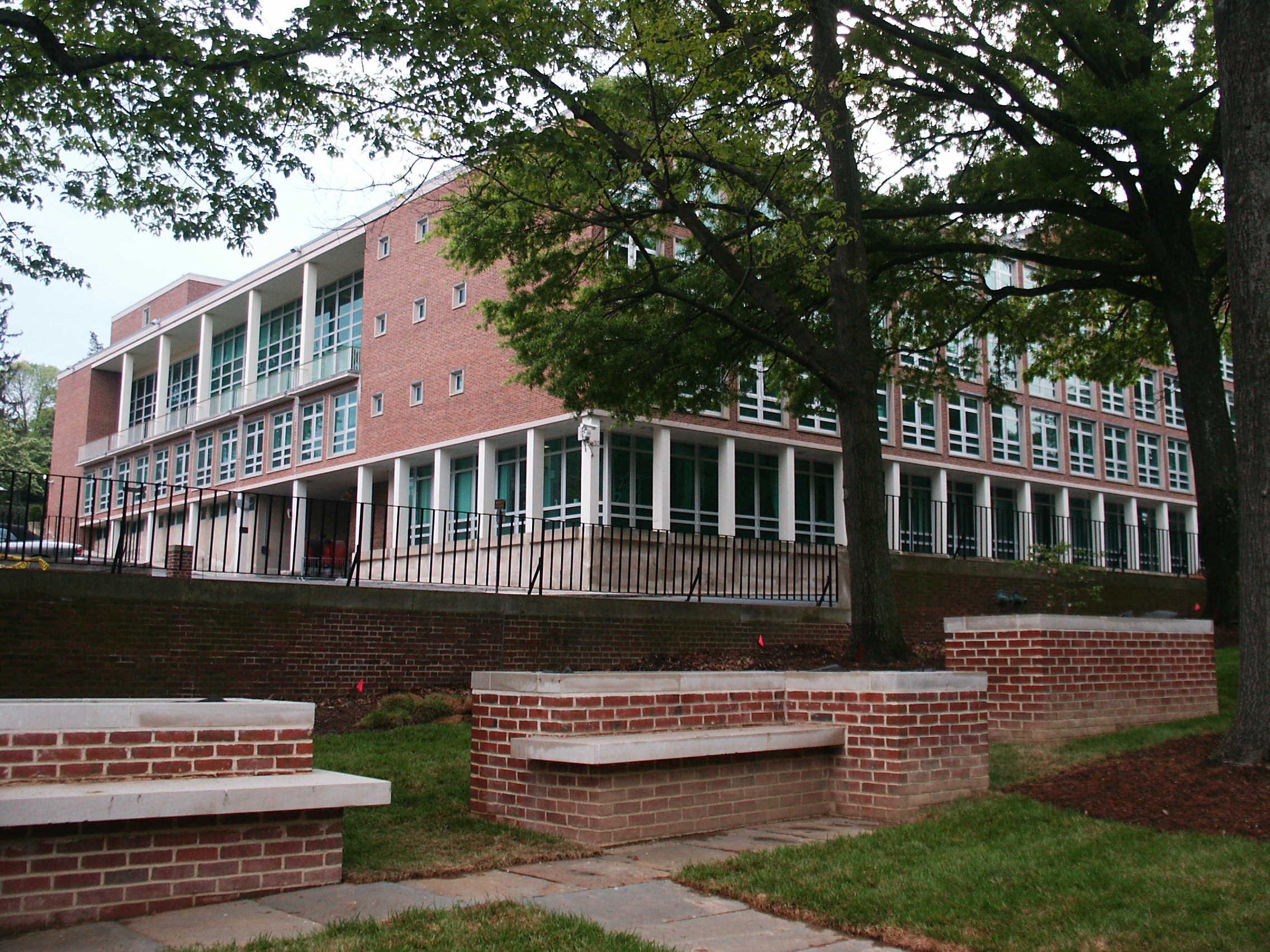
The embassy chancery offices

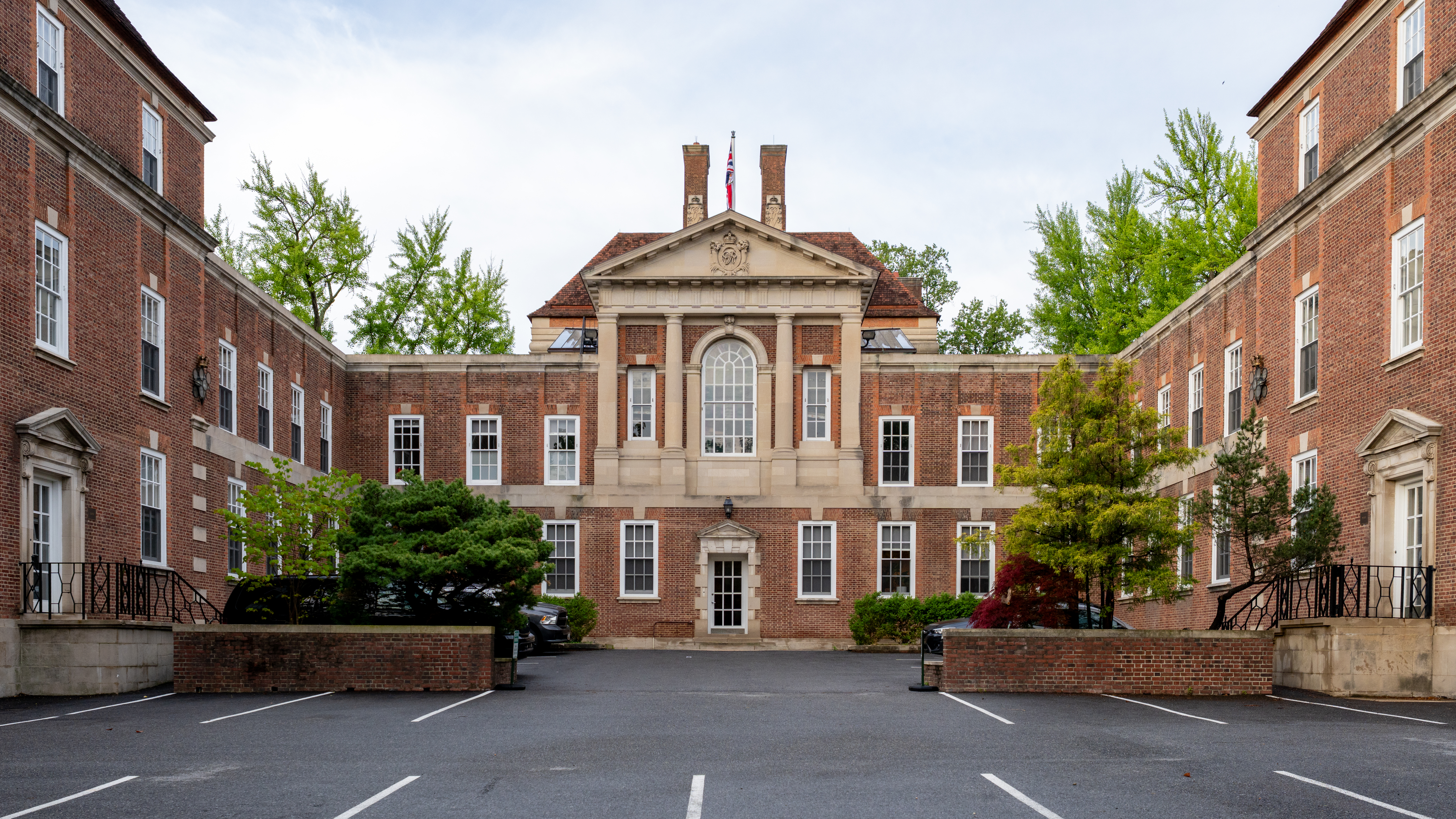
The ambassador's residence

The statue of Winston Churchill

== Staff ==
The embassy is one of the largest in Washington, employing 210 diplomats and about 250 staff. On 11 September 2025, James Roscoe who serves as Chargé d’Affaires, was appointed interim ambassador to the USA for the second time. His appointment came after British Prime Minister Keir Starmer dismissed Peter Mandelson as ambassador over new revelations regarding his past association with convicted paedophile Jeffrey Epstein.

== Events ==
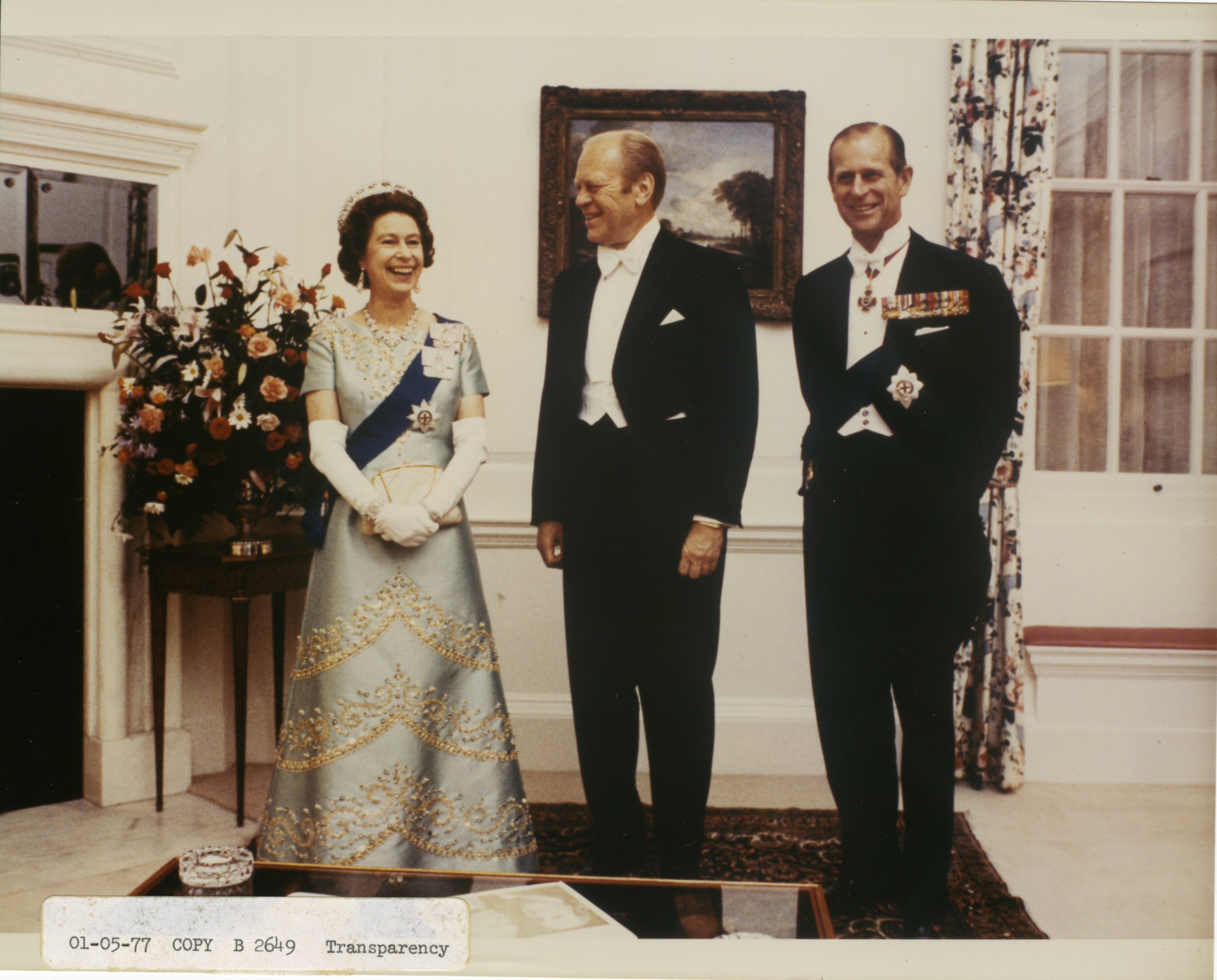
Queen Elizabeth II and the Duke of Edinburgh with President Gerald Ford at the British Embassy in July 1976

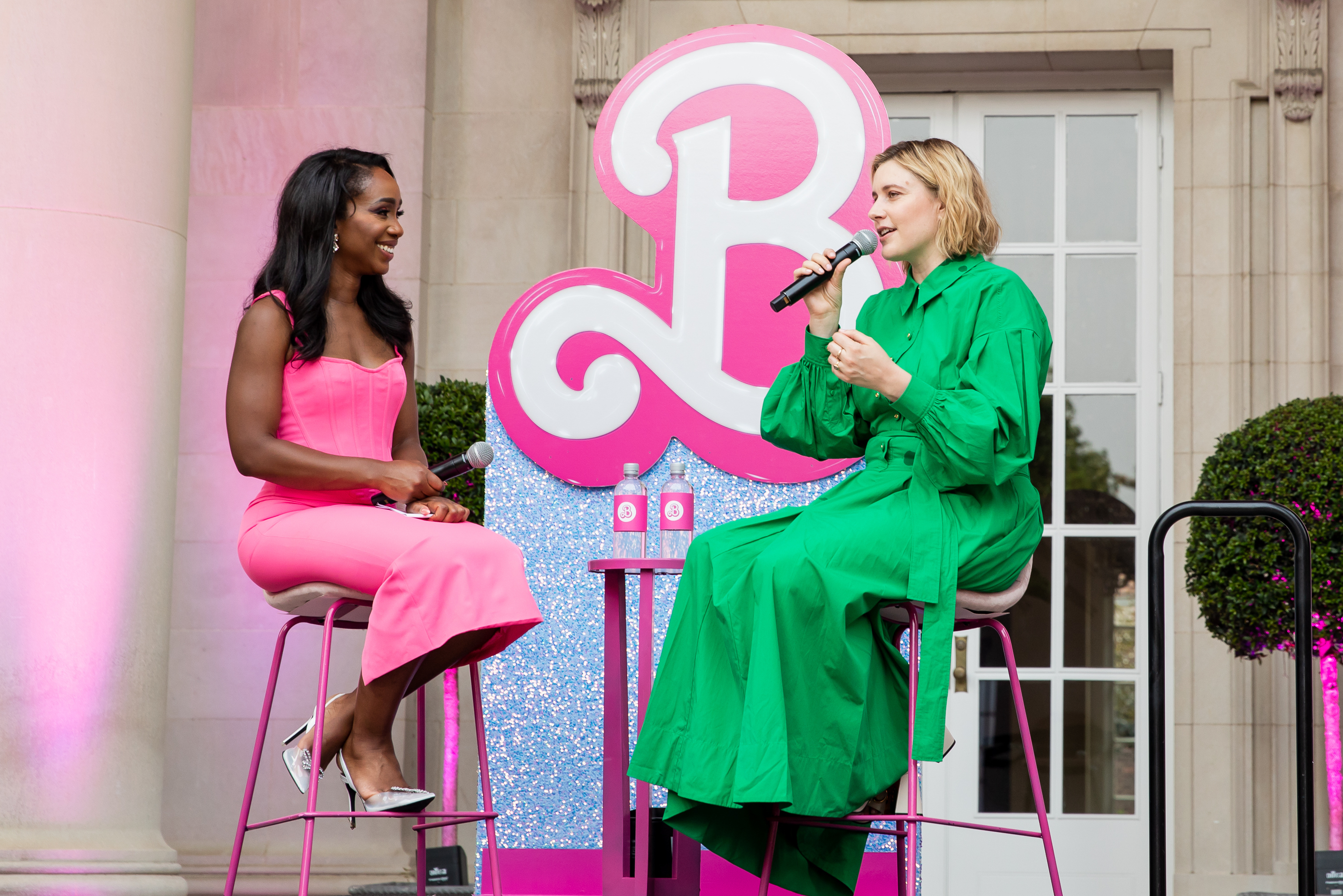
Director Greta Gerwig at an event for Barbie at the British Embassy in July 2023

On 8 June 1939, the embassy, hosted by Ambassador Sir Ronald Lindsay, held a garden party for King George VI and Queen Elizabeth, the first time that reigning British monarchs had visited the United States.

On 11 February 1964, a reception was held there for The Beatles, who had played their first concert in America earlier that day at the Washington Coliseum.

On 7 July 2005, the United States Army Band played "God Save the Queen" outside the embassy in remembrance of the victims of the 7 July 2005 London bombings. This mirrored the Band of the Coldstream Guards' unprecedented performance of "The Star-Spangled Banner" during the Changing of the Queen's Guard at Buckingham Palace on 13 September 2001 in remembrance of the victims of the 11 September attacks in the United States.

On 9 September 2022, when Queen Elizabeth II died at the age of 96 at Balmoral Castle, the embassy opened a condolence book. President Joe Biden and First Lady Jill Biden visited the embassy and its staff, delivered flowers, and were the first to sign the condolence book. Secretary of State Antony Blinken was among those who also signed.

In July 2023, the British Embassy held a reception for the Barbie film, which was filmed primarily in the UK, with director Greta Gerwig.

== Film depiction ==
The embassy was depicted in fiction in the 2006 BBC Television miniseries The State Within.

== See also ==
- List of diplomatic missions of the United Kingdom
- List of ambassadors of the United Kingdom to the United States
- List of diplomatic missions in Washington, D.C.
- United Kingdom–United States relations
- Embassy of the United States, London
