= Frederick H. Brooke =

American architect (1876–1960)

Frederick Hiester Brooke
- Born: October 9, 1876; Birdsboro, Pennsylvania, U.S.
- Died: December 24, 1960 (aged 84); Washington, D.C., U.S.
- Resting place: Oak Hill Cemetery; Washington, D.C., U.S.
- Education: Yale University; University of Pennsylvania; École nationale supérieure des Beaux-Arts
- Occupation: Architect
- Spouse: Henrietta Bates (née McKee)
- Children: Frederick H. Brooke Jr. (stepchildren); Elliott B. McKee; Francis McKee O'Brien
- Buildings: British Ambassador's residence Dumbarton Oaks; District of Columbia War Memorial; Sulgrave Club

Frederick Hiester Brooke (October 9, 1876 – December 24, 1960) was an American architect from Washington, D.C., who designed houses, schools, churches, and embassies during his 40-year career. A native of Pennsylvania, Brooke studied in the US and France before opening his practice in the nation's capital. He served overseas during World War I and would later design a memorial in West Potomac Park, which honors local soldiers. He was an active member in several professional organizations, most notably the American Institute of Architects. Brooke's wife, Henrietta, served as president of the Girl Scouts in the 1930s. Among Brooke's notable works are Dumbarton Oaks, the District of Columbia War Memorial, the Sulgrave Club and the British Ambassador's residence, which he co-designed with Edwin Lutyens.

== Biography ==
=== Early life ===
Frederick Hiester Brooke was born on October 9, 1876, in Birdsboro, Pennsylvania, to Edward and Annie (née Clymer) Brooke. He attended St. Paul's School before graduating from Yale University in 1899, where he was a member of Delta Kappa Epsilon and the Skull and Bones. He traveled abroad for two years before studying architecture from 1901 to 1902 at the University of Pennsylvania and the École nationale supérieure des Beaux-Arts in Paris until 1906. Following his graduation, he moved to Washington, D.C. and began his architectural practice.

=== Career ===
After starting his practice, Brooke shared an office with fellow architect Jules Henri de Sibour for seven years. Throughout his 40-year career, Brooke designed houses, schools, churches, and embassies, and worked with noted architects including Nathan C. Wyeth, Horace Peaslee and Edwin Lutyens.

Brooke designed buildings in various styles, but is most known for his Georgian Revival works. This includes the expansion of the Duncan Phillips House, home to The Phillips Collection, and the British Ambassador's residence on Embassy Row, which he co-designed with Edwin Lutyens. Brooke served as the on-site architect since Lutyens was overseas. Brooke also designed schools in the Georgian Revival style, including the expansion of Episcopal High School in Alexandria, Virginia, and several buildings on the campus of Virginia Episcopal School in Lynchburg, Virginia. He assisted in the Colonial Revival design of the Blanche Kelso Bruce Elementary School annex in Washington, D.C.

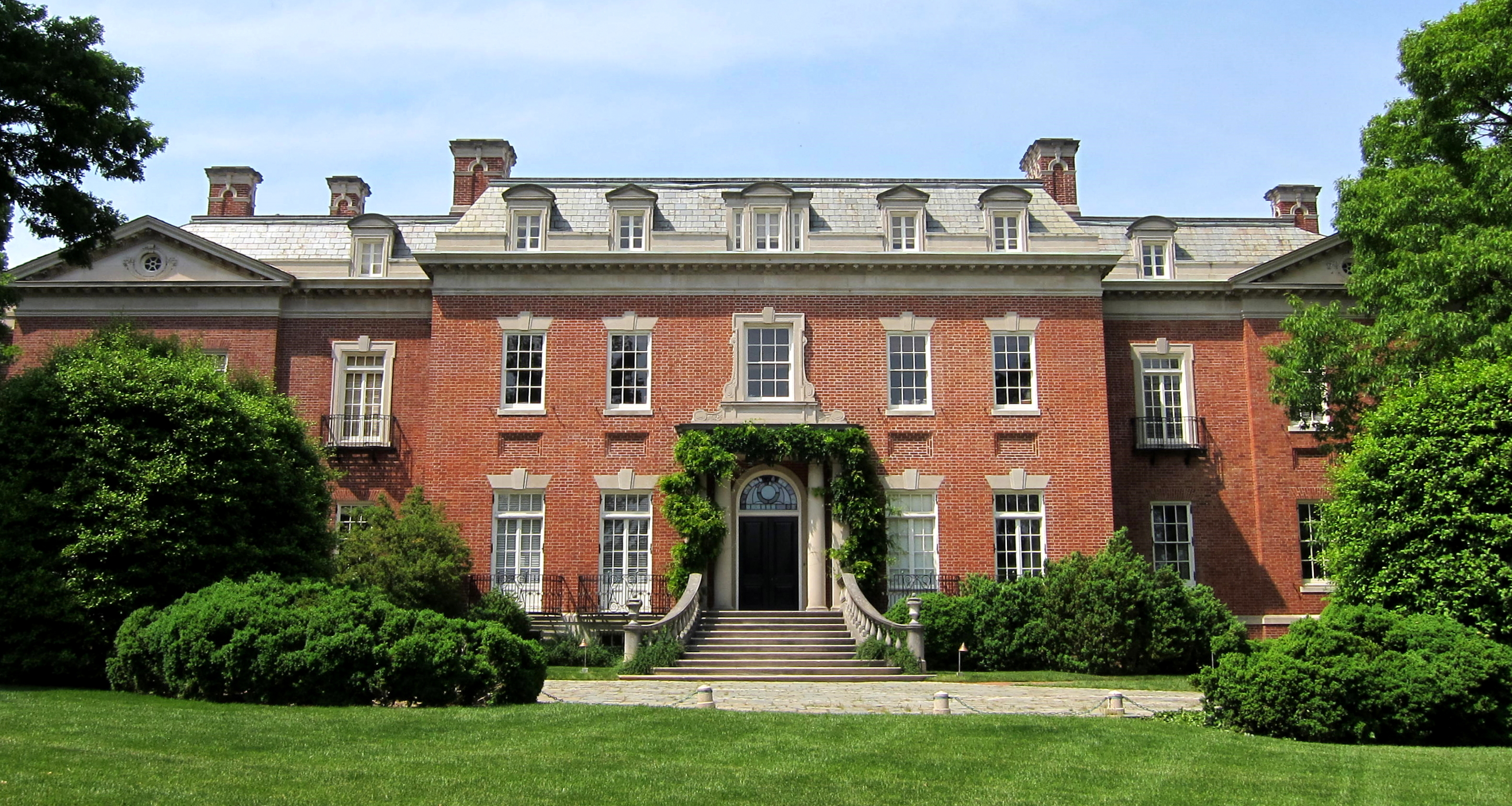
Dumbarton Oaks

Brooke designed several embassies and ambassadorial residences in addition to the British residence. He designed the Alanson B. Houghton House, which later served as the Iranian ambassadorial residence. Other countries that chose Brooke to design or alter their embassies include the Netherlands, New Zealand, Sweden, and the US, which selected Brooke to design the American consulate in Bluefields, Nicaragua.

In addition to designing new houses, Brooke assisted with renovating older homes. After Herbert and Martha Wadsworth sold their home on Dupont Circle to a group of women who began a social club, the women chose Brooke to renovate the building into the Sulgrave Club. Robert Woods Bliss and his wife Mildred hired Brooke to renovate their early 19th century home, Dumbarton Oaks, and return it to the Federal style as well as add a west wing.

Brooke worked with Wyeth and Peaslee on the design and construction of the District of Columbia War Memorial, which honors the 26,000 Washington, D.C. residents who fought in World War I. Brooke, a veteran of the war, spent several years working on the project, and his name is inscribed on the memorial, situated in West Potomac Park, just south of the National Mall. For his work on the memorial, Brooke received the Washington Board of Trade's Diplomat of Merit.

=== Later years ===
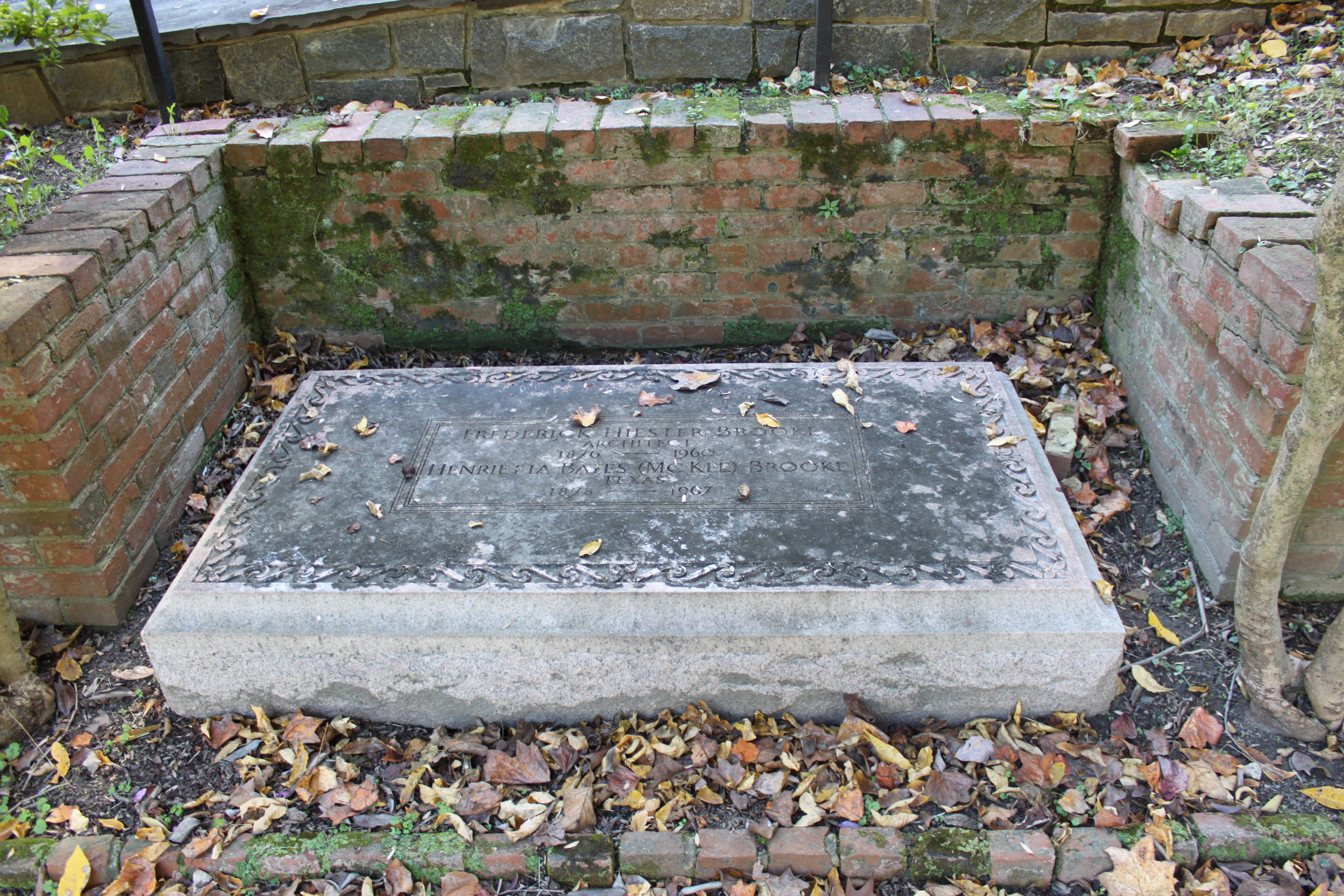
Grave of Brooke at Oak Hill Cemetery

Brooke was a member of the District of Columbia Allied Architects and the American Institute of Architects, serving on the latter's committee. He played a large role in local legislation that required architects to register with the government. Brooke was a member of several clubs, including the Alfalfa Club, Alibi Club, Beaux Arts Society, Chevy Chase Club, Metropolitan Club, University Club, Wamsutta Club, and Yale Club. Brooke served as director of Birdsboro Steel and the Brooke Iron and Work Company.

On December 24, 1960, Brooke died at his Georgetown home, 3021 N Street NW. His funeral was held at Christ Church, and he was buried at Oak Hill Cemetery, both in Georgetown. His wife, Henrietta Bates (née McKee) Brooke, who served as president of the Girl Scouts in the 1930s, died seven years later. The couple had one son, Frederick H. Brooke Jr., who was born on Christmas Day 1914. Brooke was also stepfather to Henrietta's children, Elliott B. McKee and Francis McKee O'Brien.

== Selected works ==
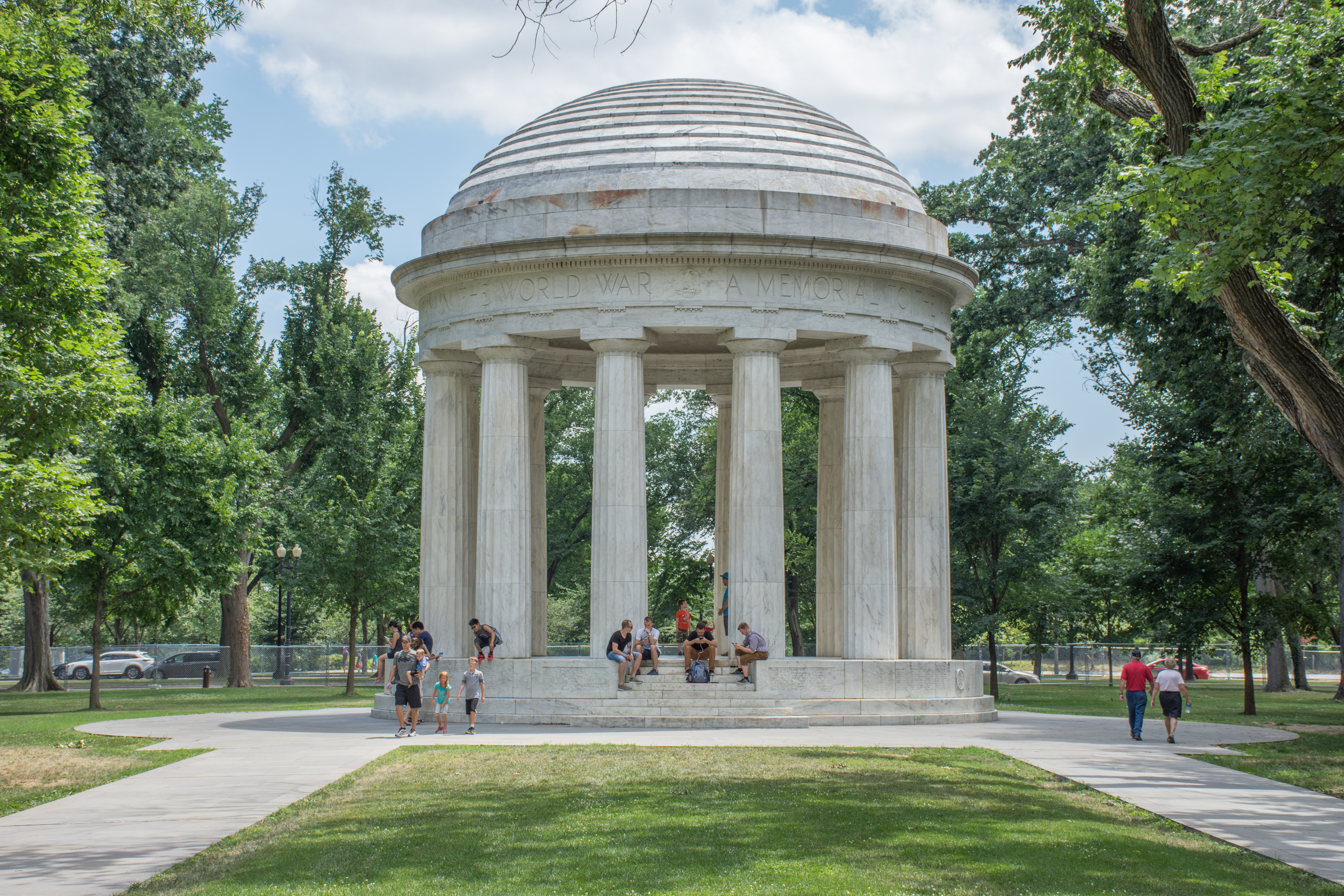
District of Columbia War Memorial

- Church of the Epiphany Parish House (1911), 1317 G Street NW
- St. John the Evangelist Episcopal Church Club House (1913), 614 Portland Avenue, St. Paul, Minnesota
- Virginia Episcopal School's Jett Hall (1916), 400 VES Road, Lynchburg, Virginia
- Church of the Epiphany McKim Memorial Tower (1922)
- The Phillips Collection expansion (1923), 1600 21st Street NW
- Dumbarton Oaks (1925), 1703 32nd Street NW
- Blanche Kelso Bruce Elementary School annex (1926), 770 Kenyon Street NW
- British Ambassador's residence (1928), 3100 Massachusetts Avenue NW
- District of Columbia War Memorial (1931), West Potomac Park
- Sulgrave Club remodeling (1932), 1801 Massachusetts Avenue NW
- Alanson B. Houghton House (1934), 3003 Massachusetts Avenue NW (later the Iranian ambassadorial residence)
- Episcopal High School expansion, 1200 North Quaker Lane, Alexandria, Virginia

== Notes ==
1. Sources differ on his birth year. Some say 1877, others say 1876. His gravestone says the latter.
