= Frances Stead Sellers =

British-American journalist

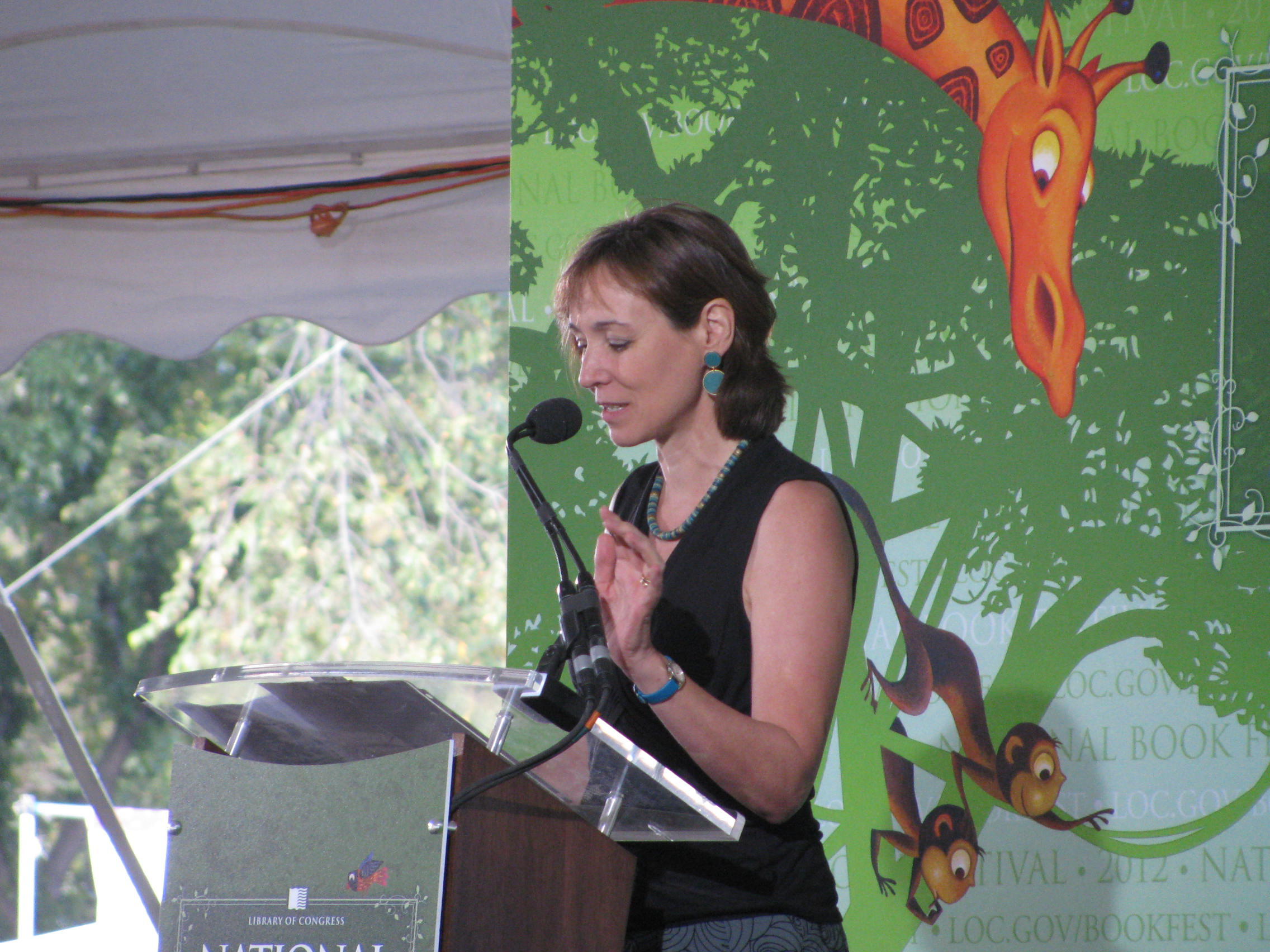
- Born: United Kingdom
- Education: University of Oxford; University of Pennsylvania
- Occupation: Journalist
- Employer(s): The Washington Post; Civilization Magazine; Dædalus
- Spouse: Mortimer Sellers

Frances Stead Sellers is a British-American journalist and moderator who serves as Associate Editor of The Washington Post where she is a frequent host of the newsroom's live platform, Washington Post Live.

== Life and career ==
Sellers’ career as a reporter, editor and moderator has ranged from politics to the arts and sciences. In recent years, as the newsroom's senior writer she has written extensively about the coronavirus pandemic and the country’s political polarization and cultural upheaval.

Sellers is a regular host of Washington Post Live, where she launched the Explaining America series and has interviewed key figures in the contemporary political and cultural conversations. The Disability in American series that she hosted won a 2022 Telly Award for diversity and inclusion.

As a national political reporter, Sellers covered the 2016 presidential campaign and was a member of the team that wrote the 2016 best seller Trump Revealed: The Definitive Biography of the 45th President.

Sellers has been a senior editor in charge of several sections of The Washington Post, including Health and Science and the signature daily section, Style, which focuses on political profiles, personalities, arts and ideas.

As deputy national editor, Sellers ran the newsroom's health, science and environmental coverage, during the H1N1 pandemic, the battle over health reform, the Deepwater Horizon oil spill and the 2011 Japanese tsunami and Fukushima Daiichi nuclear disaster.

Sellers is often called upon to explain U.S. current events to British audiences on BBC Radio 4's current affairs programming. She has appeared as a commentator on BBC World News and MSNBC's Morning Joe and interviewed prominent figures in the arts, sciences and politics. She is a moderator for idea festivals and academic conferences. Since 2022, Sellers has led the Future Trends Forum for the BankInter Innovation Foundation, convening two-day gatherings in Madrid on topics ranging from Building a Net Zero World to the Future of Computing.

Sellers started her career at Dædalus, the Journal of the American Academy of Arts and Sciences.

Sellers was born in Britain, graduated from Oxford University and came to the United States as a British Thouron scholar to study linguistics at the University of Pennsylvania. Among many other areas of interest, she is known for writing about language, citizenship and identity. Sellers is married to the law professor Mortimer Sellers.

== Awards ==
- Journalist in Residence, Max Planck Institute for Comparative Public Law and International Law, 2024
- Visiting Fellow, Reuters Institute for the Study of Journalism, 2017
- Visiting Fellow, Lady Margaret Hall, Oxford, 2017
- Press Fellow, UN Foundation, 2015
- Press Fellow, Wolfson College, Cambridge - 2006
- Alicia Patterson Foundation Fellow - 2003
- British Thouron Scholarship
