= Sulgrave Club =

Historic house in Washington, D.C., United States

- Type: Social club
- Tax ID no.: 53-0152390
- Website: www.sulgraveclub.org
- Sulgrave Club
- U.S. National Register of Historic Places
- U.S. Historic district – Contributing property
- D.C. Inventory of Historic Sites
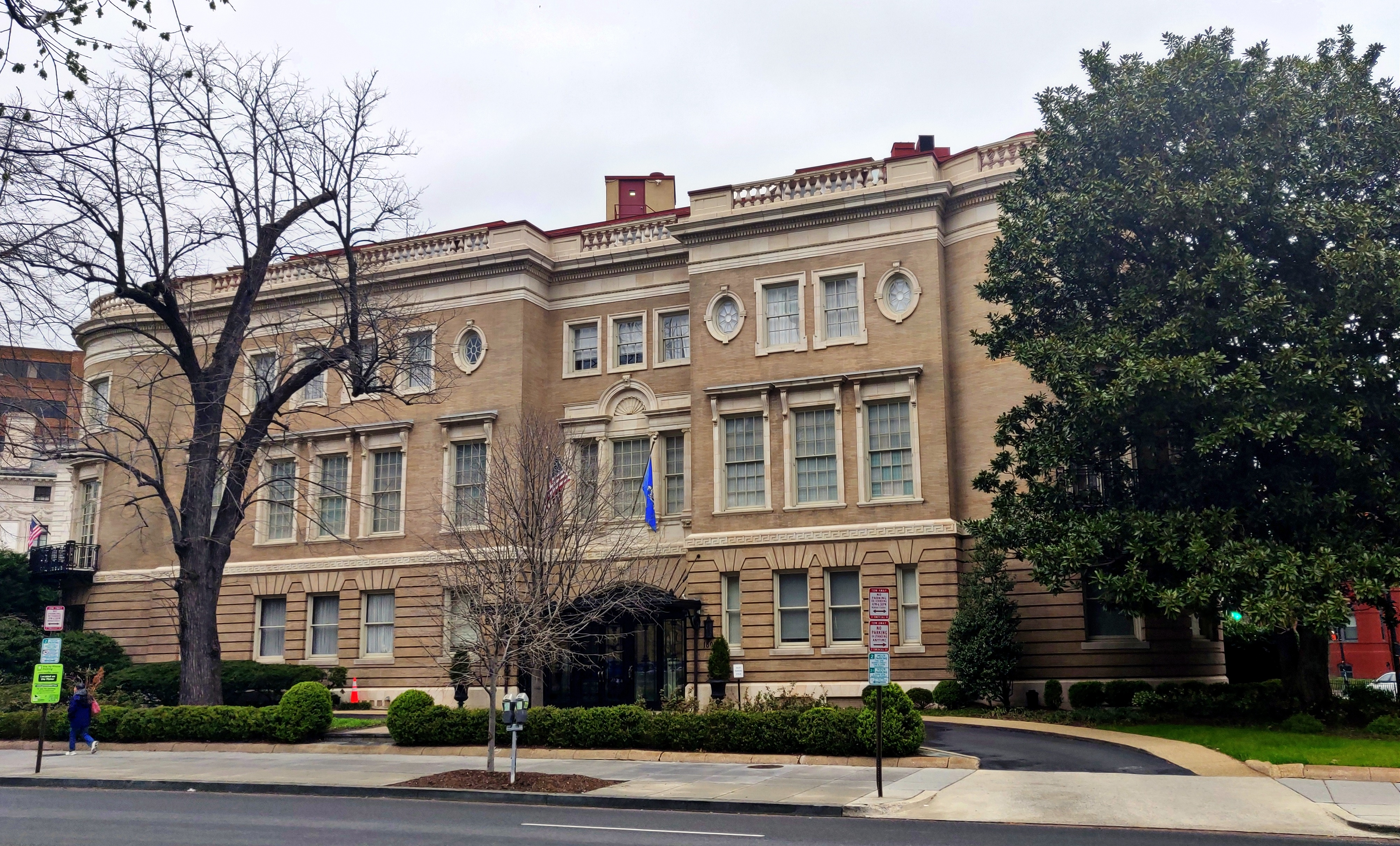
- Sulgrave Club in 2020
- Location: 1801 Massachusetts Avenue NW; Washington, D.C.
- Coordinates: 38°54′34″N 77°2′32″W
- Built: 1900
- Architects: George Cary (original); Frederick H. Brooke (renovation)
- Architectural style: Beaux-Arts
- Part of: Massachusetts Avenue Historic District (#74002166); Dupont Circle Historic District (#78003056)
- NRHP reference No.: 72001434

Significant dates
- Added to NRHP: December 5, 1972
- Designated CP: October 22, 1974; July 21, 1978
- Designated DCIHS: November 8, 1964

The Sulgrave Club is a private women's club located at 1801 Massachusetts Avenue NW on the east side of Dupont Circle in Washington, D.C. The clubhouse is the former Beaux-Arts mansion on Embassy Row built for Herbert and Martha Blow Wadsworth and designed by noted architect George Cary. During World War I the Wadsworth House was used as the local headquarters for the American Red Cross.

It has EIN 53-0152390 under the status 501(c)(7) Social and Recreation Clubs; in 2025 it reported total revenue of $7,563,089 and total assets of $16,437,308.

In 1932 a group of local women led by Mabel Thorp Boardman established the Sulgrave Club and purchased the mansion. They chose architect Frederick H. Brooke to renovate the triangular-shaped building into a clubhouse. The Sulgrave Club was added to the District of Columbia Inventory of Historic Sites in 1964 and the National Register of Historic Places in 1972. The building is also a designated contributing property to the Dupont Circle Historic District and Massachusetts Avenue Historic District.

The clubhouse is one of two remaining large houses on Dupont Circle, the other being the Patterson Mansion. The building was designed in the Beaux-Arts style, popular during the time of its construction. The clubhouse includes a lavishly decorated Beaux-Arts ballroom while some of the other rooms feature different architectural styles, including an Arts and Crafts entrance and Colonial Revival reception area.

== History ==
=== Holy Cross Episcopal Church site ===
The Holy Cross Episcopal Church once stood on the lot where the Sulgrave Club is located. The congregation was established in 1874 and although there is no record of when the church was built, the sanctuary was expanded and a brick tower added in 1882 for $2,000. The parish closed in the 1880s due to financial reasons and the property was abandoned. In 1889, the property was purchased by Senator Charles Van Wyck who lived across the street at 1800 Massachusetts Avenue NW. While their home was being remodeled, the Van Wyck family moved into the deserted church, which was a surprise to everyone in the fashionable Dupont Circle neighborhood. Members of St. Thomas' Parish began meeting in the building in 1890 until their new sanctuary was built a few years later on the corner of 18th and Church Streets NW.

=== Wadsworths and American Red Cross ===
Herbert and Martha Blow Wadsworth, a wealthy couple from Geneseo, New York who had married in 1888, wanted a winter residence in Washington, D.C., and chose Dupont Circle as the location of their new home. There were only two large lots still available on the circle where they could build a mansion, including the one where Holy Cross Episcopal Church stood. Van Wyck's widow, Kate, sold the property to the Wadsworths in 1896. The Wadsworths were already familiar with Washington, D.C., and had family and social connections with the city. Herbert's cousin, James Wolcott Wadsworth, was a congressman from New York, and Martha's sister and niece were local socialites.

On January 16, 1900, a permit application was filed to construct the Wadsworth mansion on Square 137, a triangular lot which is sited between 18th Street on the east, P Street on the north, and Massachusetts Avenue on the south. The couple chose a longtime friend, New York architect George Cary, to design their new house in the popular Beaux-Arts style. It is the only known building in Washington, D.C. that was designed by him. Cary is best known for his designs at the 1901 Pan-American Exposition and the Buffalo History Museum. Martha took a hands-on approach with the design of her new home, and would often claim she was the architect.

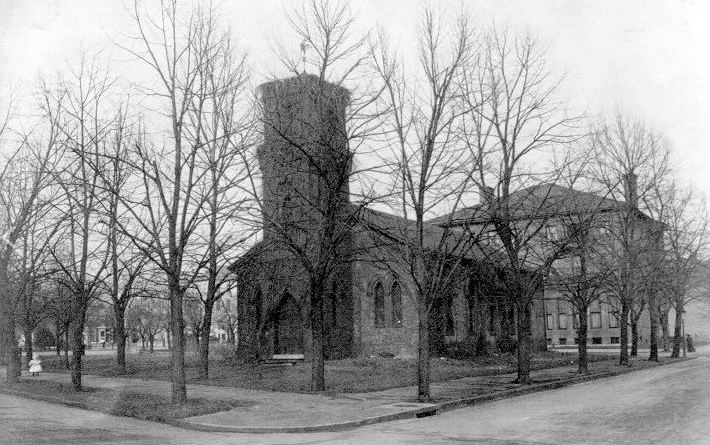
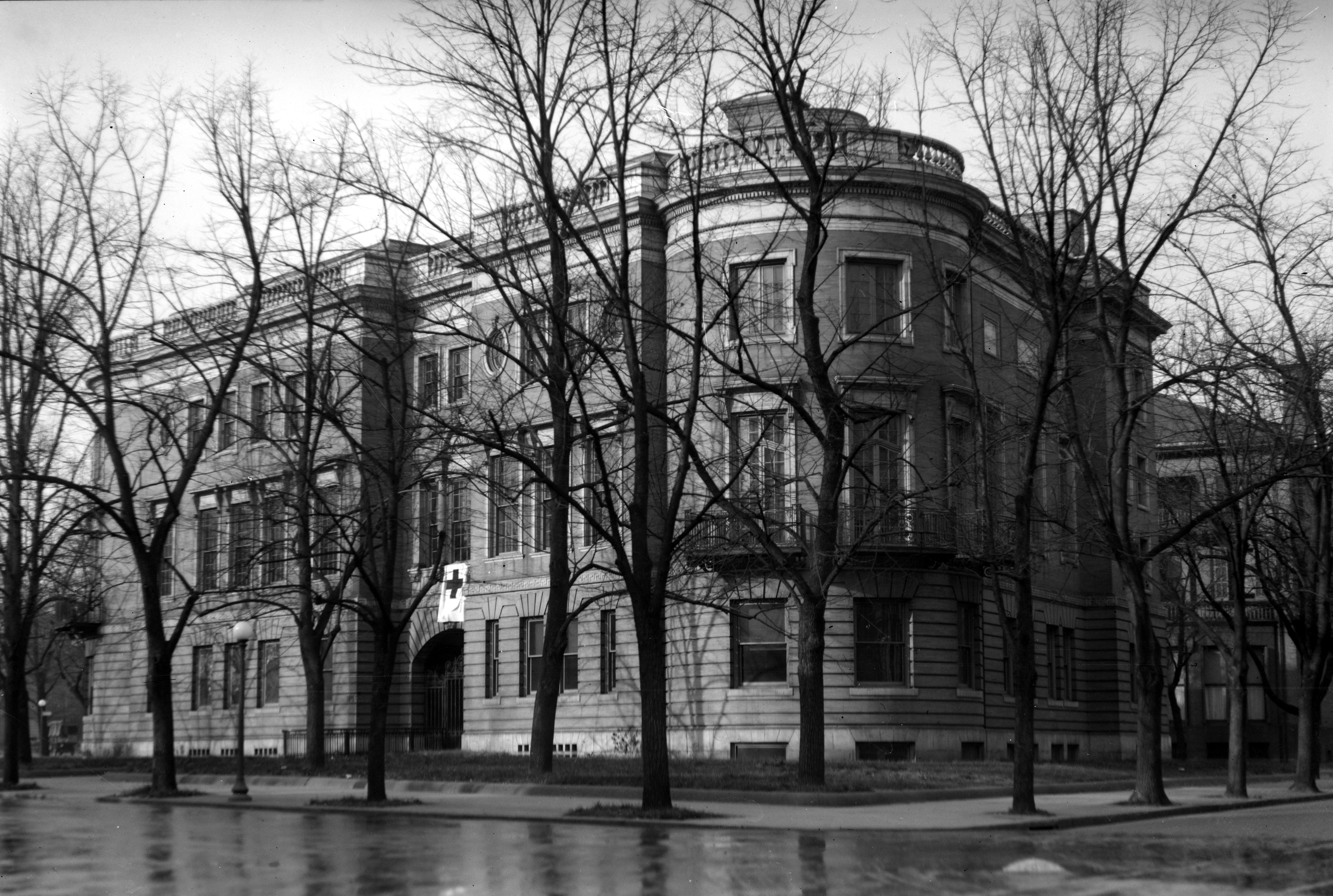
Holy Cross Episcopal Church and the same view when the Wadsworth House served as the local American Red Cross headquarters

Just like the Perry Belmont House that was built a few years later, the Wadsworth House's design was made to fit an irregular-shaped lot. The total cost of constructing the house was around $300,000. The couple had their new home designed to specifically serve as a place of entertainment and socializing. This included a two-story ballroom, a musician's gallery, a porte-cochère similar to the one across the street at the William J. Boardman House, and a new feature in the city, an automobile room that served as an internal parking garage. It is believed the porte-cochère, vestibule, servants hall, kitchen, back hallway, and automobile room incorporated the former church building.

After the house was completed by builder Charles A. Langley, Martha began years of organizing and hosting social events. These included standard social gatherings such as dances, dinners, and musicals, but she also hosted lessons for singing, beauty, jujutsu, and even held an ugliest baby photograph competition. As the couple aged, they spent less time at their Washington, D.C. home, and during World War I let an organization use the building In February 1917, the Wadsworth House became the first American private residence to be lent for use by the American Red Cross. The organization continued using the building until the war ended and the Wadsworths spent very little time at the house after that.

=== Sulgrave Club ===
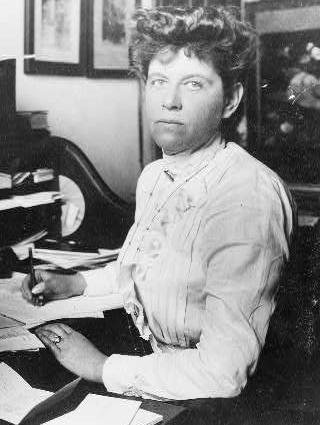
Mabel Thorp Boardman played a large role in founding the Sulgrave Club.

The Wadsworths used their home for two more years until 1920, when they abandoned it. The building sat vacant for the next twelve years. In 1932 during the Great Depression a group of 20 local women, led by Mabel Thorp Boardman who lived across the street, purchased the property for $125,000 to serve as headquarters of their new private social club. Boardman did not want to see the house further deteriorate and it would most likely have been turned into a Masonic lodge. To honor the bicentennial of President George Washington's birth, the women called their new organization the Sulgrave Club, named after Washington's ancestral English home, Sulgrave Manor.

Members chose local architect Frederick H. Brooke to oversee the renovation of the Wadsworth House into the Sulgrave Club. Some of the renovation work including removing the porte-cochère, installing new bathrooms and an elevator, and extensively redesigning the interior. The total cost of the renovation and initial real estate tax was $43,000, bringing the total investment to around $168,000. The members raised this money during the Great Depression by taking out a $50,000 mortgage, receiving a private loan of $3,000, selling bonds worth $74,500, and collecting $1,000 a piece from 41 women who would not have to pay an initiate fee or annual dues. The mortgage would eventually be paid off in 1954.

The Sulgrave Club was incorporated in April 1933 and according to its charter, the group was founded for "literary, musical, artistic and philanthropic purposes, and for promotion of social intercourse." The club forbade diplomats from becoming members and barred press photographers. In addition to Boardman, Sulgrave Club founders include: Henrietta Brooke, May Palmer Depew, Christine Gillett, Laura M. Gross, Bell Gurnee, Florence Jaffray Harriman, Sallie Aley Hert, Adelaide Wellington Houghton, Boardman's sister Florence Boardman Keep, Ellen Warder Leonard, Agnes E. Meyer, Louise Norman, Cissy Patterson, Isabel Weld Perkins, Elizabeth Hope Gammell Slater, Nelly Katherine Sweeney, Mildred Fuller Wallace, Annie Louise Bliss Warren and Maie Hewitt Williams.

Club founders wanted their organization to be the center of local society much like the Colony Club in New York and Chilton Club in Boston were at the time. The club began hosting musical and artistic gatherings, dinners, debutante balls, and other events that attracted the city's high-profile women. Prominent early members included Helen Herron Taft and Alice Roosevelt Longworth. Within months of its founding, the Sulgrave Club had already hosted prominent events including an official dinner for UK Prime Minister Ramsay MacDonald.

The Sulgrave Club continued hosting many notable people and events during the next several decades, including breakfasts with President Dwight D. Eisenhower, an inaugural party for President Jimmy Carter, launch parties for Frances Parkinson Keyes novels, and performances by Arthur Rubinstein. One infamous event that took place in 1950 at the clubhouse involved Senator Joseph McCarthy and journalist Drew Pearson, who had teased McCarthy while at their table. As Pearson waited at the coat check, McCarthy confronted him, kneed Pearson in the groin, and then violently slapped him. McCarthy was eventually stopped by another guest attending the dinner, a senator from California, future President Richard Nixon.

On November 8, 1964, the building was added to the District of Columbia Inventory of Historic Sites, and on December 5, 1972, listed on the National Register of Historic Places (NRHP). The clubhouse is also designated a contributing property to the Massachusetts Avenue Historic District, listed on the NRHP on October 22, 1974, and the Dupont Circle Historic District, listed on the NRHP on July 21, 1978.

In the 21st century the Sulgrave Club continues to be a popular place to gather. Even though some of the other social clubs in the city have closed, like the Sulgrave Club's main competitor across the street, the Washington Club housed in the Patterson Mansion, the Sulgrave Club still has a waiting list to join and brings in millions of dollars each year. Members and their guests attend dinners, parties, talks on various topics, and have the option to stay the night in one of the club's bedrooms. Honorary members of the club during its history have included First Ladies, cabinet members, congresswomen, and military officials.

== Location and design ==
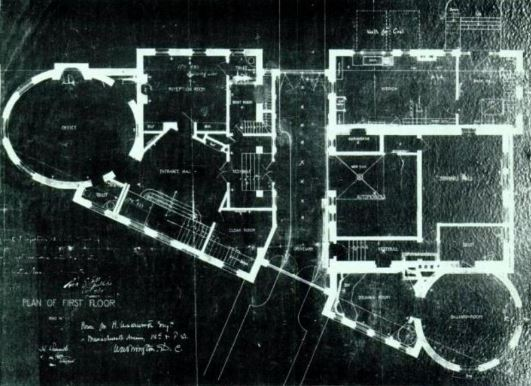
George Cary's original floor plan from January 16, 1900.

The Sulgrave Club is located at 1801 Massachusetts Avenue NW on the northern portion of Square 137, in a triangular lot bounded by 18th Street, Massachusetts Avenue, and P Street. The main entrance is on the Massachusetts Avenue side and the west corner of the property faces Dupont Circle. The east side of the building facing 18th Street measures 76 ft (23.2 m), the south side facing Massachusetts Avenue measures 136 ft (41.5 m), and the north side facing P Street measures 125 ft (38.1 m). The building is 40 ft (12.2 m) tall, 3.5 stories, and includes a basement.

The architectural style is an eclectic example of Beaux-Arts and includes 18th century English and French design elements. There are three composite bays on the 18th Street side, five composite bays on the P Street side, and nine bays on the Massachusetts side. The corner facing Dupont Circle and the corner facing 18th Street and Massachusetts Avenue each feature three-bay bows. The base of the clubhouse is limestone and features decorative molding. The building is made of yellow brick with a limestone cornice between the first and second floors. The block sill windows on the first floor feature voussoirs. The more elaborate second floor double hung windows include panel architraves, friezes, and overhangs. On the same floor there are Louis XVI French windows and wrought-iron balconies. The exception is on the east windows where the ballroom is located. The windows there are higher and do not have balconies. There are limestone oval-shaped and double-hung windows on the third floor.

The main entrance on Massachusetts Avenue is where the porte-cochère once led carriages through the property to P Street. The porte-cochère was filled in during the 1932 renovation and the entrance featured a standard porch. In 1952 the entrance was remodeled and replaced with a canopy supported by iron corbels, a limestone stoop, and eight glazed French door panels. Above the entrance are Palladian windows with fluted columns, pilasters, and an entablature. The mansard roof features include limestone entablatures, architraves, friezes, and an urn balustrade.

Many of the original details remain inside the house, despite renovations that have occurred through the years. The Arts and Crafts style entrance hall leads guests to the Colonial Revival style reception room on the east side of the building. The stair hall and oval library are on the west side of the building. The stairs lead to the piano nobile, dining room, oval salon, and lavishly decorated Beaux-Arts ballroom. The servants quarters on the fourth floor (attic) were renovated into rooms available for overnight guests.

== See also ==
- List of women's clubs
- National Register of Historic Places listings in Washington, D.C.
