= Terah Lyons =

American technology policy scholar

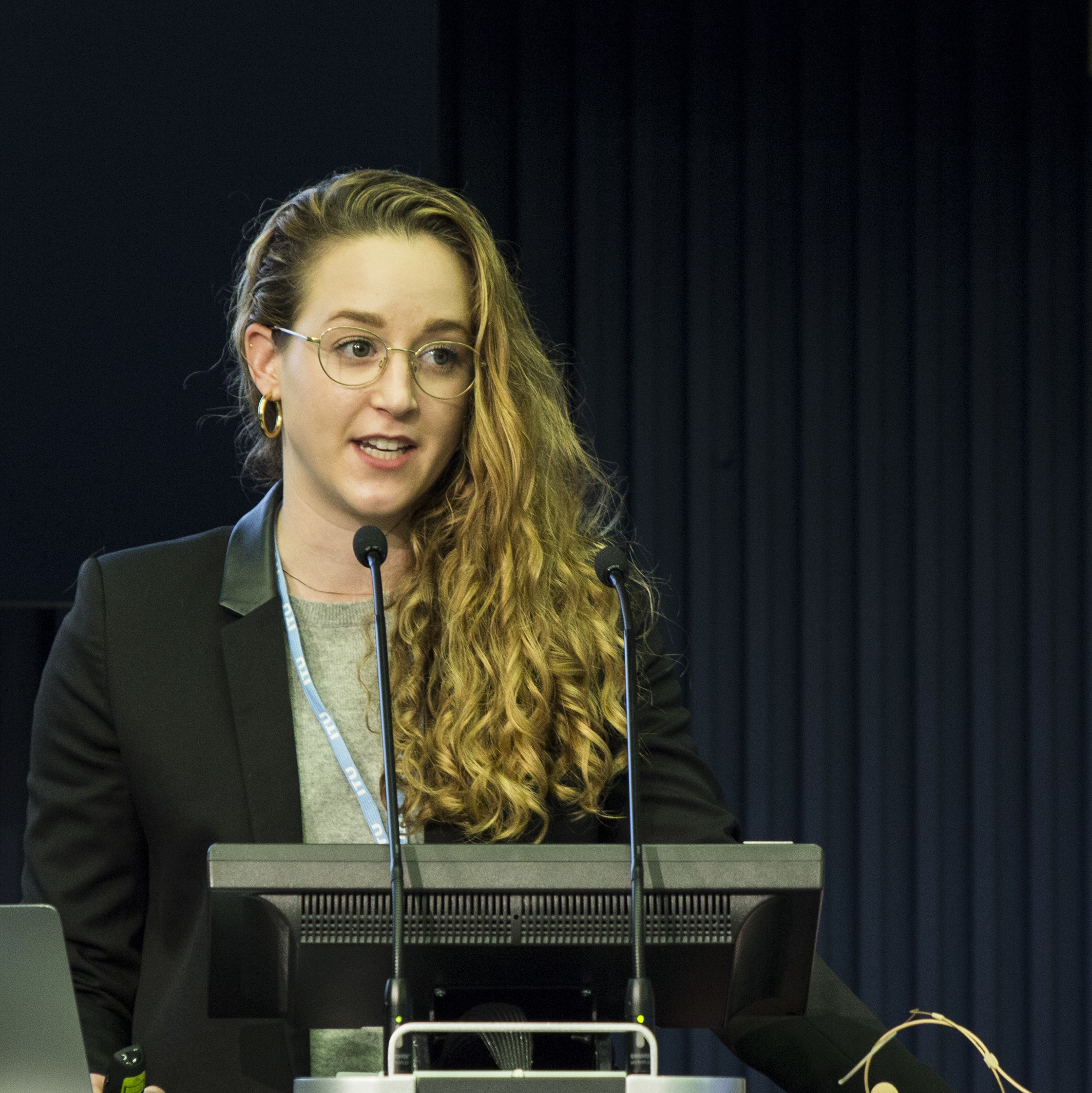
- AI for Good Global Summit 2018
- Born: Palm Springs, California
- Education: Harvard University
- Occupation: Executive Director
- Employer(s): Partnership on AI; Office of Science and Technology Policy, 2015–2017
- Known for: Artificial Intelligence, Technology Policy
- Awards: Thouron Award
- Website: terahlyons.com

Terah Lyons is known for her work in the field of artificial intelligence and technology policy. Lyons was the executive director of the Partnership on AI and was a policy advisor to the United States Chief Technology Officer Megan Smith in President Barack Obama's Office of Science and Technology Policy.

== Education and early career ==
Lyons was raised in Fort Collins, Colorado. She received her Bachelor's Degree from Harvard University in 2014 in Social Studies with a focus on Network Theory and Complex Systems. During her time at Harvard, she received the Thouron Award in 2012 to study for a summer at the University of Cambridge. While at Harvard, she worked as a research analyst for David Gergen at the Kennedy School of Government Center for Public Policy. Her senior thesis was entitled "Social Networks and Shibboleths: Gender Diversity and Stratification in Structures of Elite Corporate Leadership." Following her time at Harvard, she became a Fellow with the Harvard School of Engineering and Applied Sciences based in Cape Town, South Africa.

== Public service career ==
Lyons joined President Barack Obama's Office of Science and Technology Policy, which was run by the President's Science Advisor John Holdren, in 2015. In 2016, she began working for the United States Chief Technology Officer Megan Smith. During her tenure as a civil servant, her portfolio centered on machine intelligence, including AI, robotics, and intelligent transportation systems.

Lyons co-directed The White House Future of Artificial Intelligence Initiative, which engaged stakeholders—industry, academia, government employees, the international community, and the public at large—to develop a domestic policy strategy on machine intelligence. That work culminated in a report called Preparing for the Future of Artificial Intelligence, which detailed opportunities, considerations, and challenges in the field of AI. Highlights from the report include policy recommendations to ensure that the power of AI is channeled to advance social good and improve government operations, recommendations for regulations on AI technologies such as automated vehicles, and recommendations to develop a diverse workforce equipped to tap into the potential and tackle the challenges that will come with the AI revolution. The report was the culmination of five public workshops and a request for public comment that received 161 responses.

Lyons also helped draft the December 2016 report Artificial Intelligence, Automation, and the Economy, which detailed the ways in which artificial intelligence will transform the American economy in the coming years and decades. The report outlined five key primary economic efforts that should be a priority for policymakers, including preparing for changes in skills demanded by the job market and the shifting of the job market as some jobs disappear while new opportunities are created.

Since 2024, Lyons is a Managing Director at JPMorgan Chase, where she is Global Head of AI Policy.

== The Partnership on AI ==
In 2017, Lyons was recruited to lead the Partnership on AI, a research and policy organization founded by Facebook, Google, Microsoft, and a number of other technology corporations. The mission of the nonprofit organization is to research and provide thought leadership around the direction of AI technologies, including machine perception, learning, and automated reasoning. As stated on their website, the goals of the organization are to: (1) develop and share best practices on research and development related to AI; (2) advance public understanding; (3) provide opportunities for engagement across diverse audiences; (4) identify new efforts for the future of AI for the social good. Lyons has testified in front of the House of Representatives Oversight & Government Reform Committee Subcommittee on Information Technology to discuss the promise of artificial intelligence and advocate for the importance of the Partnership on AI.

In her position as executive director, Lyons has advocated for the importance of diversity, equity, and inclusion in the AI workforce. In 2018, she spoke at The New York Times new work summit about why inclusion is a crucial issue to address in the fields of computer science and AI especially. Lyons is also a member of the Center for a New American Security's Task Force on Artificial Intelligence and Security to investigate opportunities and challenges AI poses to American security.

In 2022, Lyons was one of the Steering Committee Members for Stanford University's 2022 AI Index Report. The report which is partnered with companies such as Google, OpenAI and Open Philanthropy, evaluates the rate in which AI advancement from research, development, performance, ethics, education, policy and governance is developing. The report includes a broad range of data from academic, private and non-profit organisations in addition to self collected data and analysis.

== Awards and recognition ==
- Thouron Prize, 2012
- Mozilla Technology Policy Fellow, 2017
- Women in AI Ethics Hall of Fame, 2021
