= District of Columbia War Memorial =

- U.S. National Register of Historic Places
- D.C. Inventory of Historic Sites
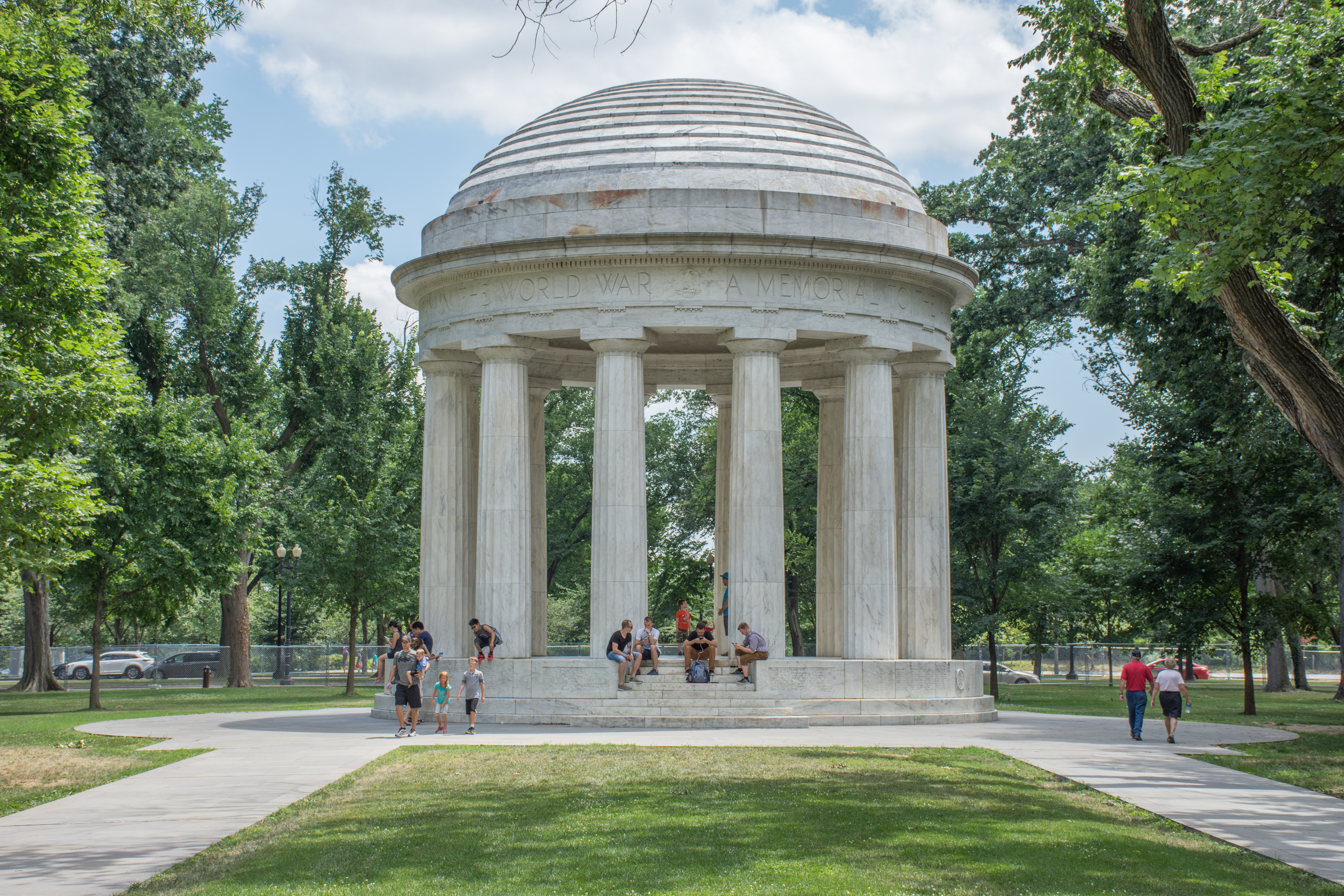
- District of Columbia War Memorial

- Location within Central Washington, D.C.
- Location: Independence Ave. between 17th & 23rd Sts., Washington, D.C., United States
- Coordinates: 38°53′15.32″N 77°02′36.6″W
- Built: 1931
- Architect: Frederick H. Brooke, Horace Peaslee, Nathan C. Wyeth
- Architectural style: Doric order
- NRHP reference No.: 14000388
- DCIHS No.: 722

Significant dates
- Added to NRHP: July 11, 2014
- Designated DCIHS: May 23, 2013

The District of Columbia War Memorial commemorates the more than 26,000 "residents and citizens" of the District of Columbia who performed military service in World War I, including the 499 who gave their lives in that service. Located on the National Mall, it was constructed in 1931 as a domed, peristyle Doric temple designed to serve as a bandstand for public events. In a practice unusual for the time, the names are listed in alphabetical order, without regard to rank, gender, race, or national origin.

== History ==
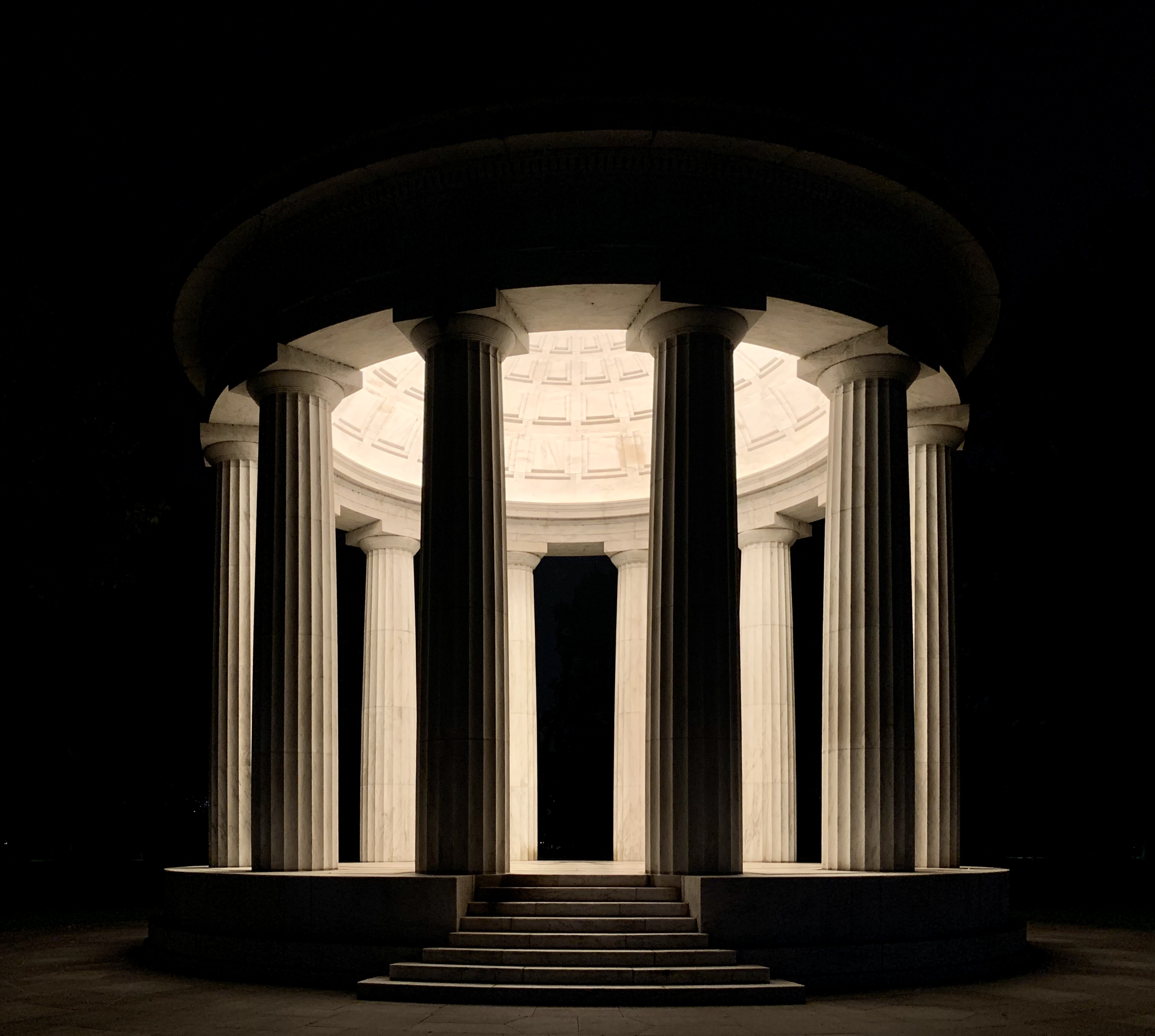
The memorial at night.

The memorial was built to honor World War I service members who died in the war. It stands in West Potomac Park slightly off Independence Avenue in a memorial grove of trees. Authorized by an act of Congress on June 7, 1924, funds to construct the memorial were provided by the contributions of both organizations and individual citizens of the District. Construction of the memorial began in the spring of 1931, and the memorial was dedicated by President Herbert Hoover on November 11, 1931 (Armistice Day). It was the first war memorial to be erected in West Potomac Park, part of the National Mall near the Lincoln Memorial, and remains the only local District memorial on the National Mall.

Designed by Washington architect Frederick H. Brooke, with Horace Peaslee and Nathan C. Wyeth as associate architects, the District of Columbia War Memorial is in the form of a 47-foot (14 m) tall circular, domed, peristyle Doric temple. Resting on concrete foundations, the 4-foot (1.2 m) high marble base defines a platform, 43 feet 5 inches (13.23 m) in diameter, intended for use as a bandstand. Twelve 22-foot (6.7 m) tall fluted Doric marble columns support the entablature and dome. Preserved in the cornerstone is a list of 26,000 Washingtonians who served in the Great War. Inscribed on the base are the names of the 499 District of Columbia "residents and citizens" who died in service, listed in alphabetical order without regard to rank, race, gender, or national origin, together with medallions representing the branches of the armed forces. The dome inscription reads, "A Memorial to the Armed Forces from the District of Columbia Who Served Their Country in the World War," and the base inscription reads, in part, "The names of the men and women from the District of Columbia who gave their lives in the World War are here inscribed as a perpetual record of their patriotic service to the country. Those who fell and those who survived have given to this and to future generations an example of high idealism, courageous sacrifice and gallant achievement."

In September 2008, Rep. Ted Poe of Texas, with the support of Frank Buckles, then the last living US veteran of World War I, proposed a bill in Congress stating the memorial should be expanded and designated the national memorial to World War I.

In July 2010, the National Park Service announced that restoration work, funded by the American Recovery and Reinvestment Act of 2009, would soon begin on the memorial. Work began in October 2010, and the memorial reopened on November 10, 2011. It was listed on the National Register of Historic Places in 2014.

The memorial is administered by the National Park Service under its National Mall and Memorial Parks unit.

== See also ==
- List of public art in Washington, D.C., Ward 2
- National Register of Historic Places listings in central Washington, D.C.
- 16th Street World War I Memorial Trees
- National World War I Memorial (Washington, D.C.)
