= Mortimer Sellers =

American legal scholar

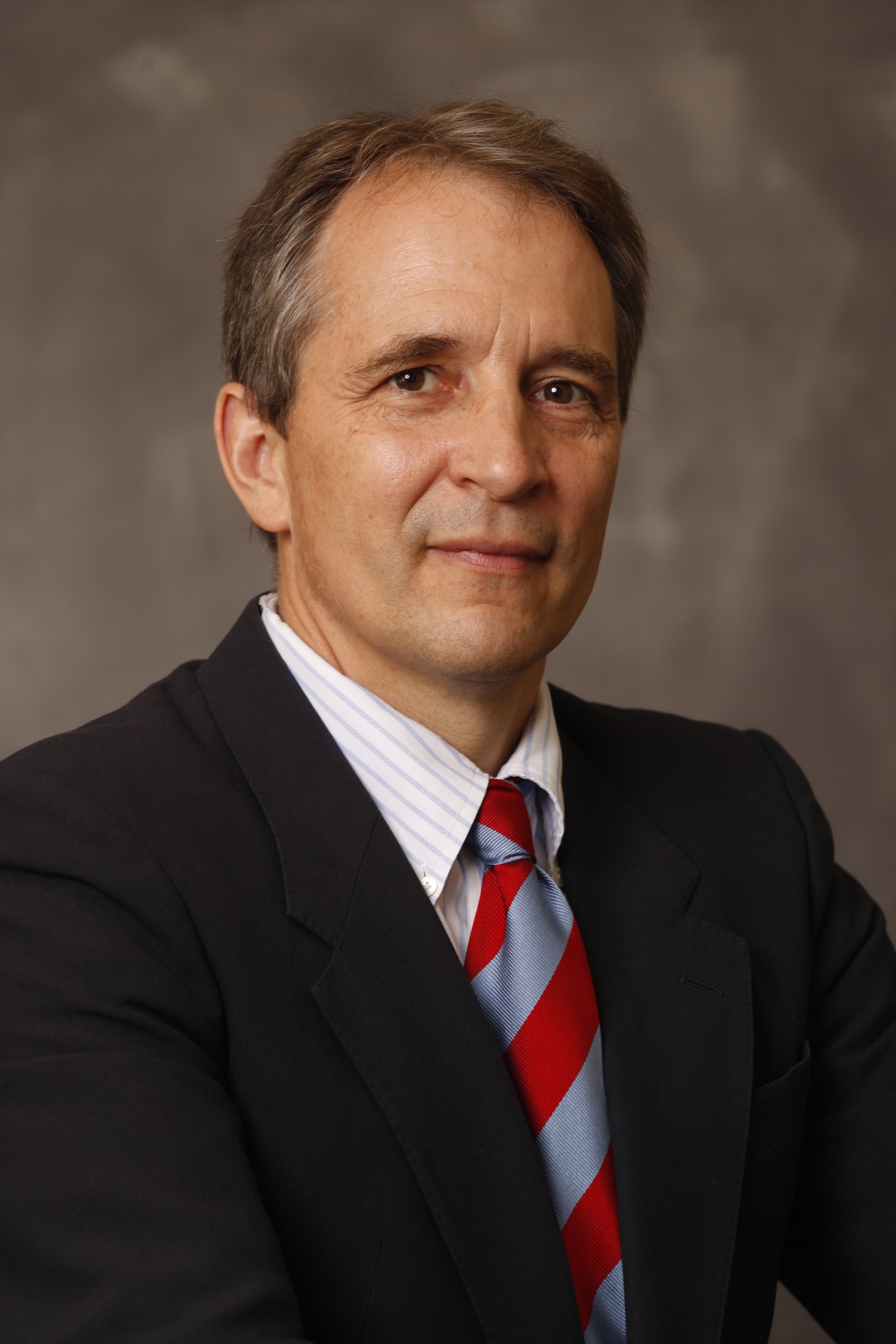

Regents Professor, University System of Maryland – Elkins Professor of Law, University of Baltimore School of Law

Personal details
- Born: 1959 (age 66–67) Philadelphia
- Spouse: Frances Stead Sellers
- Education: Harvard College (A.B.); Harvard Law School (J.D.); Oxford University (B.C.L.); Oxford University (D.Phil.)
- Occupation: Professor of Law; Author; Philosopher; Historian; Lawyer

Mortimer Newlin Stead Sellers (M.N.S. Sellers) (born 1959) is Regents Professor of the University System of Maryland, Elkins Professor of the University System of Maryland, Professor of Law at the University of Baltimore School of Law, and past President of the International Association for Philosophy of Law and Social Philosophy (IVR). His work primarily concerns the philosophy of law, legal theory, and global justice with an emphasis on international law, constitutional law, comparative law and legal history. He has been a Regents Professor of the University System of Maryland since 2003, the highest honor in the UM System. Sellers is best known for his books on republican legal and political philosophy, global justice, international law, and universal human rights. He has been Director of the University of Baltimore Center for International and Comparative Law since 1994.

== Education ==
The interdisciplinary nature of Sellers' work has been consistent throughout his career. After graduating from Harvard College, summa cum laude, and Harvard Law School, with honors, Sellers studied history, philosophy, and Civil Law at University College, Oxford as a Rhodes Scholar and Frank Knox Fellow, receiving his doctorate in Literae Humaniores (philosophy and classics). He has taught in the University of Baltimore School of Law since 1989, and has taught and pursued research as a visitor at Oxford University, Cambridge University, Harvard University, Georgetown University Law Center, Bryn Mawr College, Erasmus University Rotterdam, and the Academy of International Law in The Hague.

== Career ==
Along with authors such as Philip Pettit and Jürgen Habermas, Sellers has been a leader in reviving republican ideas among philosophers and lawyers and in international politics. Sellers' conception of republicanism is grounded in the history of ideas, with an emphasis on constitutional procedures and the concept of the common good. Sellers has written extensively on the republican antecedents of the French Revolution and the American Revolution, and the influence of legal philosophy and legal education on political and social change. He has been an active participant in the development of post-Soviet and post-authoritarian legal institutions in Europe, Asia, and South America.

Sellers’ public influence arises in part from his editorship (with Mark Agrast) of the book series ASIL Studies in International Legal Theory and (with David Gerber) of ASCL Studies in Comparative Law, both published by Cambridge University Press. Much of the most important new thought in international and comparative law has been published in these series. He is also the editor (with Stephan Kirste) of the IVR Encyclopedia of the Philosophy of Law and Social Philosophy.

In addition to his scholarly work, Sellers has been active in promoting international cooperation between lawyers and judges to advance global justice, through the European-American Consortium for Legal Education (EACLE) and the Brazil-United States Administration of Justice Project, among other initiatives. He is an associate editor of the American Journal of Comparative Law and a member of the editorial board of the Archiv für Rechts- und Sozialphilosophie, Lusíada Direito, Notícia do Direito Brasileiro, and Glossae: The European Journal of Legal History. Sellers is an elected member of the International Academy of Comparative Law, a former H.L.A. Hart Fellow of University College, Oxford, and former Lauterpacht Fellow of Cambridge University. Sellers is married to the journalist Frances Stead Sellers.

Sellers is a hereditary member of the Maryland Society of the Cincinnati as the great-great-great-great-grandnephew of Captain James Peale of the First Regiment, Maryland Continental Line, who was an artist like his elder brother Charles Wilson Peale.

See also: Sellers family

== Bibliography ==
=== Books by M.N.S Sellers ===
- Law, Reason, and Emotion (Cambridge, 2017)
- Parochialism, Cosmopolitanism, and the Foundations of International Law (Cambridge, 2011)
- The Rule of Law in Comparative Perspective (with Tadeusz Tomaszewski) (Springer, 2010)
- The Internationalization of Law and Legal Education (with Jan Klabbers) (Springer, 2008)
- Autonomy in the Law (Springer, 2007)
- Republican Principles in International Law: The Fundamental Requirements of a Just World Order (Palgrave Macmillan, 2006)
- Universal Human Rights: Moral Order in a Divided World (with David Reidy) (Rowman and Littlefield, 2005)
- Place, Memory and Time (with Anthony F.C. Wallace and H. Dabbs Woodfin) (Nicholas Newlin Press, 2004)
- Republican Legal Theory: The History, Constitution and Purposes of Law in a Free State (Palgrave Macmillan, 2003)
- The Sacred Fire of Liberty: Republicanism, Liberalism and the Law (Macmillan, 1998)
- The New World Order: Sovereignty, Human Rights, and the Self-Determination of Peoples (Berg, 1996)
- American Republicanism: Roman Ideology in the United States Constitution (Macmillan, 1994)
- An Ethical Education: Community and Morality in the Multicultural University (Berg, 1994)
