= David Parks =

David Parks may refer to:

- David Parks (politician) (born 1943), state senator from Nevada
- David Parks (photographer) (born 1944), American photographer, film director, publicist, and author
- Dave Parks (1941–2019), American football player

== See also ==
- David Parkes (disambiguation)
- David Park (disambiguation)
