= University of Baltimore Center for International and Comparative Law =

University of Baltimore School of Law's Center for International and Comparative Law
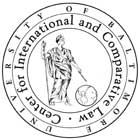
- Type: Public
- Established: 1994
- Director: Mortimer Sellers
- Location: Baltimore, Maryland, United States
- Campus: Urban
- Nickname: CICL
- Website: http://law.ubalt.edu/cicl

The University of Baltimore School of Law's Center for International and Comparative Law (CICL), established in 1994, sponsors research, publication, teaching, and the dissemination of knowledge about international legal issues, with special emphasis on human rights, democracy, intellectual property, and international business transactions. Initiatives are coordinated with other University System of Maryland institutions through the System Associates Program and the John Sumner Stead Colloquium on International and Comparative Law. The center hosts a number of visiting lecturers, events, and colloquia throughout the year, including Visiting Fellows in International and Comparative Law on year- or semester-long visits. The two primary public programs are the annual John Sumner Stead Lecture on International and Comparative Law and the Stead Seminar on International and Comparative Law.

== Faculty and staff ==
=== Mortimer Sellers ===
Mortimer Sellers has been director of the University of Baltimore Center for International and Comparative Law since 1994. He is Regents Professor of the University System of Maryland and law professor at the University of Baltimore School of Law. Sellers has written numerous books and articles on international law, constitutional law, legal history, comparative law, and jurisprudence.

=== James Maxeiner ===
James Maxeiner is the associate director of the Center for International and Comparative Law. He is experienced in both academics and practice both in American and in German law. Professor Maxeiner joined the faculty in 2004. He has visited at other law schools, including Rutgers, The Catholic University of America, the University of Missouri-Kansas City, and Stetson. He is a member of the American Law Institute.

=== Nienke Grossman ===
Nienke Grossman is the deputy director of the center. She teaches in the areas of international law, international environmental law, conflict of laws, and international criminal law. Her research focuses on the increasing use of international courts and tribunals to resolve disputes as well as the role of women in international law. She is most interested in what contributes to and detracts from these institutions’ legitimacy. In October 2016, she spoke at the United Nations as part of a panel discussion titled “Gender Balance and Diversity in International Adjudication: A Glass Ceiling?" In April 2017, Grossman was named to an independent panel that will assess six nominees competing for three vacant positions on the Inter-American Commission on Human Rights.

=== Eric Easton ===
Eric Easton is a Senior Research Associate in UBalt's Center for International and Comparative Law and coordinator of CICL's China-related programs. He has also taught comparative media law at the University of Aberdeen, Scotland, Cyber law at The University of Netherlands Antilles in Curaçao, and U.S. Constitutional and copyright law at Shandong University, China. He has also been a visiting scholar at the Journalism Institute of the Chinese Academy of Social Sciences. He is currently the Faculty Director of the LL.M. Program in the Law of the United States (LOTUS)

=== Catherine Moore ===
Catherine Moore is the Coordinator for International Law Programs for the center. In this capacity, she manages a broad portfolio of programs, including the LL.M. in the Law of the United States (LOTUS), international exchange and study abroad programs, and she is the program director for the Winter Study Abroad Program in Curaçao. She currently teaches the CICL Fellows course and oversees student work on a variety of projects. She is also a Junior Expert with the ABA-UNDP International Legal Resource Center, most recently advising them on the Draft Cybercrime Law in Cambodia and how it interferes with international human rights standards on the freedom of expression and right to privacy. Additionally, Moore is International Law Counsel with the Military Commissions Defense Organization for Guantanamo detainee, Nashwan al-Tamir, who is being tried by the Military Commissions as Abdul Hadi al Iraqi.

=== CICL Student Fellows ===
CICL Student Fellows are selected each year based upon the academic performance of the student in International Law, the involvement of the student in student activities, such as the International Law Society or the International Law Journal, and the overall interest and enthusiasm that student shows for international law. Students work on various projects under the direct supervision of the CICL Fellows professor. Current and past Fellows can be found here. Past projects include the publication of policy papers on refugee issues, including a field mission to Greece, with Advocates Abroad performing remote research in international criminal law for TRIAL International, preparing memos on business and human rights issues for International Rights Advocates, and researching international human rights and humanitarian law for the Military Commissions Defense Organization.

== Publications ==
The Center for International and Comparative Law offers several scholarly book series publications covering a range of international legal theory under the direction of its director, Professor Mortimer Sellers. With titles such as The Internationalization of Law and Legal Education, The Rule of Law in Comparative Perspective, and Parochiolism, Cosmopolitanism, and the Foundations of International Law leaves no doubt to the scope and breadth of the center's mission.

=== AMINTAPHIL ===
The American Section of the International Association for Philosophy of Law and Social Philosophy (AMINTAPHIL) is a book series that considers the philosophical foundations of law and justice from the perspectives of academic philosophy, practical political science and applied legal studies. The series dedicates each volume to the most pressing contemporary problems in legal theory and social justice. AMINTAPHIL holds biennial meetings of leading scholars in philosophy, law, and politics to discuss the philosophical basis of vital questions. The AMINTAPHIL volumes present the ultimate results of these discussions.

=== ASIL Studies in International Legal Theory ===
ASIL Studies in International Legal Theory is a book series published by Cambridge University Press and edited by Center Director Mortimer Sellers and Elizabeth Andersen, executive director of the American Society of International Law. Prior to becoming a book series, International Legal Theory was a journal published by the ASIL. The purpose of the ASIL Studies in International Legal Theory is to clarify and improve the theoretical foundations of international law. Too often the progressive development and implementation of international law has foundered on confusion about first principles. The series raises the level of public and scholarly discussion about the structure and purposes of the world legal order and how best to achieve global justice through law. this series grows out of the International Legal Theory project of the American Society of International Law. The ASIL Studies in International Legal Theory deepen this conversation by publishing scholarly monographs and edited volumes of essays considering subjects in international legal theory.

=== Jus Gentium ===
Jus Gentium, a Springer Verlag book series of the Center for International and Comparative Law, facilitates analysis and the exchange of ideas about contemporary legal issues from a comparative perspective.

== Consortiums and conferences ==
=== EACLE ===
The European-American Consortium for Legal Education (EACLE), founded in 2000, educates future educators and lawyers for transnational challenges, by giving them transnational experiences as part of their legal studies. Five European and five United States law schools are in partnership to exchange students, faculty, scholarship, and experience, so that law students will have a broader understanding of the interrelated legal world in which they will practice their profession. The ten partners are American University, the University of Baltimore, Erasmus University Rotterdam, the University of Georgia, the University of Ghent, Helsinki University, Hofstra University, the University of Parma, Santa Clara University and Warsaw University.

The primary activities of the EACLE consortium have been:

- the exchange of faculty every fall for week- or semester-long visits;
- the exchange of students during the spring semester;
- an annual conference in May; and
- the publication of the conference proceedings the following fall.

Each year different European and American schools are paired, following a three-year scheduled rotation, to make the primary exchanges of one faculty member and two students. Other exchanges take place each year by agreement between the schools involved.

The consortium is currently inactive.

=== IVR ===
The International Association for Philosophy of Law and Social Philosophy (IVR) was founded in Berlin on October 1, 1909. The purpose of the Association is the cultivation and promotion of legal and social philosophy at both the national and the international level. The Association is open to all relevant scholarly disciplines. The Association, as well as its national sections, shall organize congresses, lectures and other events of a similar nature. The national sections are autonomous with respect to the organization of their events and also solely responsible for their financial affairs.

The center had a pivotal role in the organization of the 2015 World Congress in Washington, DC.

== Sister Schools ==
The University of Baltimore School of Law has 19 foreign partners with whom the law school exchanges faculty and students and cooperates in research and publications. University of Baltimore students may also have an opportunity to spend a semester abroad at other overseas institutions by special arrangement with the University of Baltimore School of Law.
