= Esther D. du Pont =

American horse breeder & philanthropist (1908-1984)

- Born: Esther Driver du Pont; January 21, 1908; Wilmington, Delaware, US
- Died: March 24, 1984 (aged 76); Jupiter Island, Florida, US
- Occupations: Philanthropist; Racehorse owner/breeder
- Spouse(s): Campbell Weir (m. 1928–1939) John R.H. Thouron (m. 1953–1984)
- Parents: Lammot du Pont II (father); Natalie Driver Wilson (mother)

Esther Driver du Pont, Lady Thouron (January 21, 1908 – March 24, 1984) was an American horse breeder and philanthropist who created the Thouron Award with her husband, Sir John R.H. Thouron KBE.

== Biography ==
Born in Wilmington, Delaware, she was a member of the wealthy Du Pont family, one of eight children born to Lammot du Pont II and Natalie Driver Wilson.

From 1928 to 1939, she was married to Campbell Weir. In 1953, she married for a second time to John Rupert Hunt Thouron, a native of Cookham in Berkshire, England. In 1960, they established the Thouron Scholars Program of student exchanges between the University of Pennsylvania and leading universities in the United Kingdom. In 1967, she received an Honorary Doctorate in Humane Letters from the University of Pennsylvania in recognition of her work.

=== Thoroughbred horse racing ===
Esther du Pont and her husband owned a large estate near Unionville, Chester County, Pennsylvania they called "Doe Run." Like other du Pont family members such as William duPont, Jr., Allaire du Pont, Marion duPont Scott, Jane du Pont Lunger, and Alice du Pont Mills, Esther du Pont too became a fan of thoroughbred horse racing. She bred and raced a number of horses for both flat racing and steeplechase events. In 1944, her horse Burma Road won the most prestigious steeplechase race in the United States, the American Grand National and in flat racing, her colt Royal Vale won the 1953 Massachusetts Handicap.

Esther du Pont Thouron helped build the clinic and hospital at the University of Pennsylvania School of Veterinary Medicine's New Bolton Center. In 1966, her contribution to the industry was recognized by the Thoroughbred Owners and Breeders Association who awarded her its Lady's Sportsmanship Award.

=== Death ===
Esther du Pont Thouron died at her winter home in Florida on March 24, 1984, at age 76.
