= David Park (art historian) =

British art historian

David William Park FSA (born 23 May 1952) was a professor at the Courtauld Institute of Art, University of London, where was Director of the Conservation of Wall Painting Department until 2018. Park is a graduate of Manchester University and Corpus Christi College, Cambridge University and has been a Fellow of the Society of Antiquaries of London since 1986. Park established the Conservation of Wall Painting department at the Courtauld Institute of Art with Sharon Cather.

Park established the National Wall Painting survey in the 1980s, which is a specialist archive of unpublished art historical and conservation research on the wall paintings of England. The archive has been partially digitised in recent years.

== Selected publications ==
- 'The earliest Holy Kinship image, the Salomite controversy, and a little known centre of learning in northern England in the twelfth century' (with M. Naydenova-Slade), Journal of the Warburg and Courtauld Institutes, 71 (2008), 95–119.
- 'Mural painting in Transcaucasia’, in Mural Paintings of the Silk Road: Cultural Exchanges between East and West (Proceedings of the 29th International Symposium on the Conservation and Restoration of Cultural Property, Tokyo, January 2006), ed. K. Yamauchi, Y. Taniguchi and T. Uno, London 2007, 3-8 (also published in the Japanese version of the Proceedings).
- 'The painted decoration of Ewenny Priory and the development of Romanesque altar imagery' (with S. Stewart), in Cardiff: Architecture and Archaeology in the Medieval Diocese of Llandaff (British Archaeological Association Conference Transactions, 29), ed. J. R. Kenyon and D. M. Williams, Leeds 2006, 42–59.
- 'The painted plaster' (with H. Howard), in Sherborne Abbey and School Excavations 1972-1976 and 1990, ed. L. Keen and P. Ellis, Dorchester 2005, 107–16.
- 'Late medieval paintings at Carlisle' (with S. Cather), in Carlisle and Cumbria: Roman and Medieval Architecture, Art and Archaeology (British Archaeological Association Conference Transactions, 27), ed. M. McCarthy and D. Weston, Leeds 2004, 214–31.
- 'English medieval wall painting in an international context', in Conserving the Painted Past: Developing Approaches to Wall Painting Conservation (Post-prints of an English Heritage conference, 1999), eds. R. Gowing and A. Heritage, London 2003, 1–8.
- Catalogue entries in Gothic: Art for England 1400-1547, ed. R. Marks and P. Williamson (catalogue of exhibition at the Victoria & Albert Museum), London 2003.
