= British ambassador's residence in Washington, D.C. =

- The British ambassador's residence
- U.S. Historic district – Contributing property
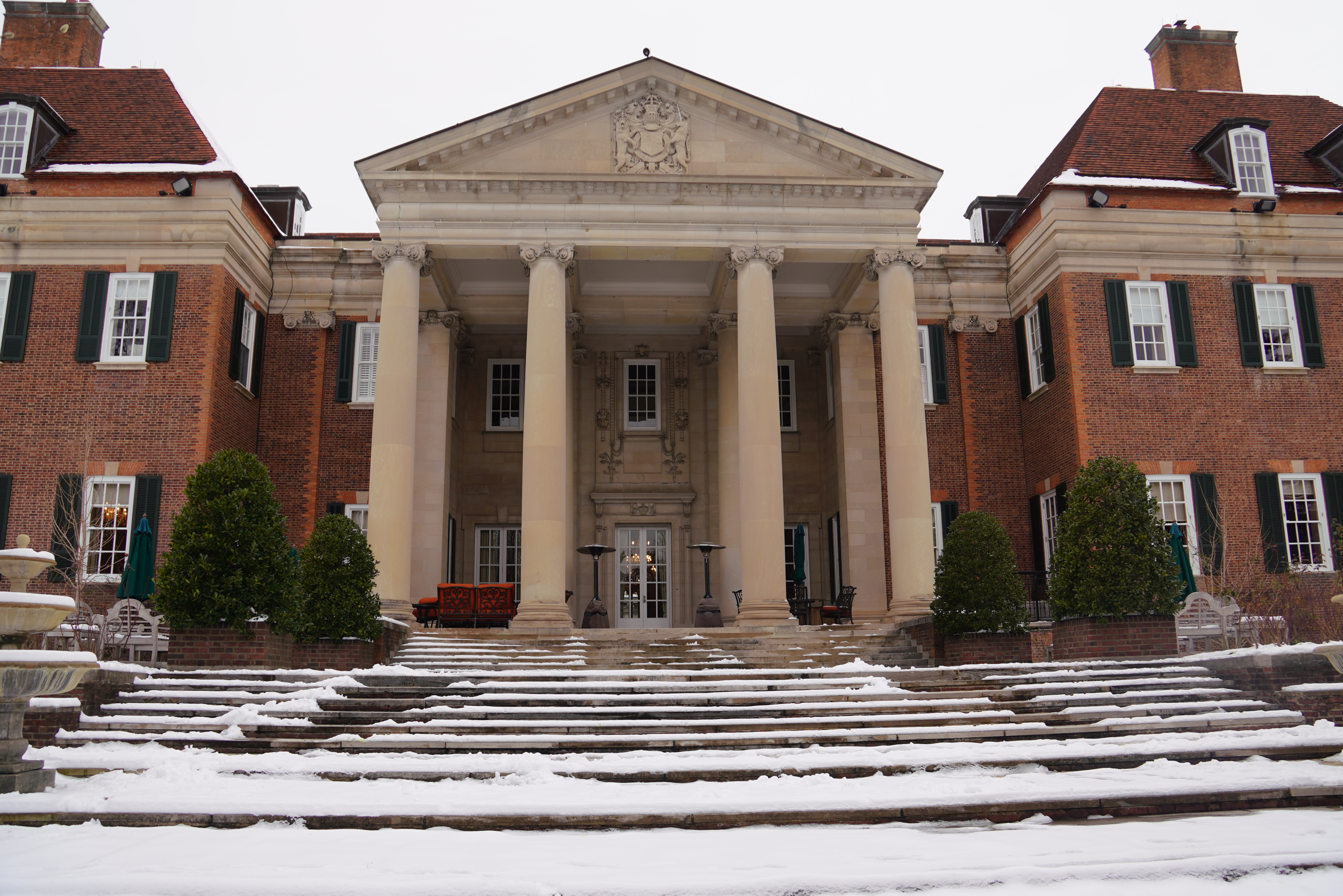
- Principal southern facade overlooking garden
- Location: 3100 Massachusetts Avenue, NW; Washington, D.C.
- Coordinates: 38°55′15.92″N 77°3′46.79″W
- Built: 1928
- Architect: Edwin Lutyens
- Architectural style: Queen Anne
- Part of: Massachusetts Avenue Historic District (ID74002166)
- Designated CP: November 26, 1973

The British ambassador's residence in Washington, D.C. is located at 3100 Massachusetts Avenue, Northwest, Washington, D.C. in the Embassy Row neighborhood. The British embassy compound also includes the chancery office.

== History and architecture ==
The house was commissioned in 1925, and designed by Sir Edwin Lutyens in 1928. An example of Queen Anne Revival architecture, the residence is the only building Lutyens designed in North America. Frederick H. Brooke, the on-site architect, assisted with the design and oversaw the construction of the embassy, which was conducted by developer Harry Wardman. The full facade of the building was designed to face southwards towards its gardens, and the building was roofed with Ludowici clay tile.

The home is the most prominent part of a compound that also includes the offices of the embassy chancery and is a contributing property to the Massachusetts Avenue Historic District, which is listed on the National Register of Historic Places.

King Charles III, then Prince of Wales, and Diana, Princess of Wales stayed at the residence during their 1985 visit to Washington, D.C. Its 2009 property value is $31,308,480. There are about 10,000 visitors each year.

The residence, together with the embassy offices, underwent a 5 year renovation costing £118.8 million ending in 2023.

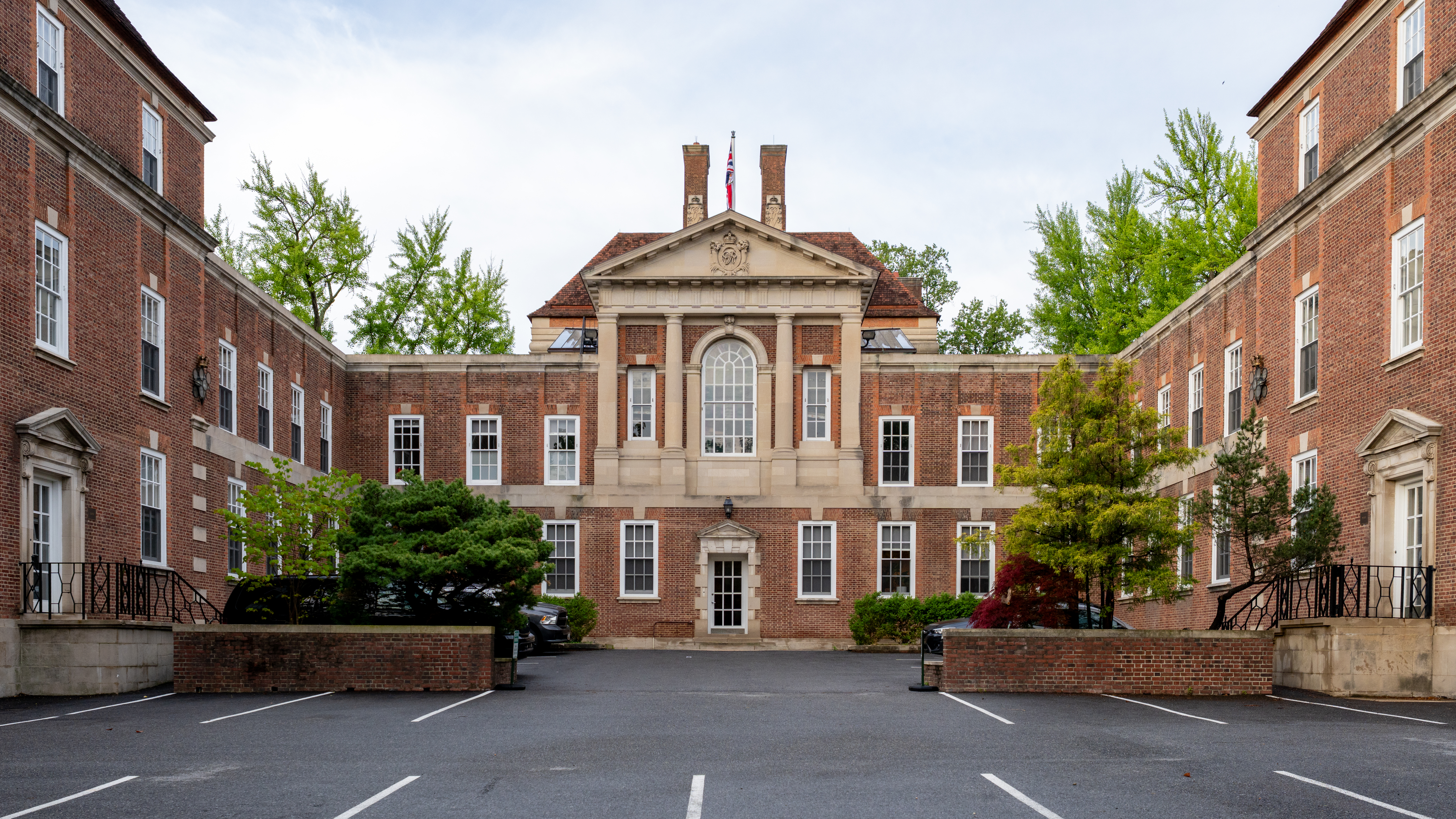
View of eastern facade from Massachusetts Avenue

Hallway

Sitting room

Library

== See also ==
- Embassy of the United Kingdom, Washington, D.C.
- Winfield House, the equivalent American residence in London
