= David Parkes (footballer, born 1950) =

Irish footballer

Personal information
- Date of birth: 7 April 1950 (age 76)
- Place of birth: Dublin, Ireland
- Position: Left-back

Senior career*
Years	Team	Apps	(Gls)
1967–1968	St Patrick's Athletic	20	(0)
1968–1969	Drogheda	21	(1)
1969–1973	Bohemians	75	(4)
1973–1975	Shamrock Rovers	58	(0)
1975–1977	Waterford	44	(2)

International career
- League of Ireland XI
- * Club domestic league appearances and goals

David Parkes (born 7 April 1950) is an Irish former soccer player who was active during the 1960s and 1970s. After retiring he became a singer .

Parkes made his League of Ireland debut for St Patrick's Athletic in 1967 and signed for Bohemians in 1969. He played his part in Bohs FAI Cup winning campaign of 1970 where he formed a solid full-back partnership with John Doran. He spent 4 seasons at Dalymount Park making 76 appearances in the league and 3 appearances in European competition.

He signed for Shamrock Rovers in January 1973 where he stayed for two and a half years. He later played for Waterford and Drogheda United.

His son Gary played for Rovers Under 16s in the 90s.

== Football Honours ==
- FAI Cup: 1
  - Bohemians - 1970

== Sources ==
- Paul Doolan; Robert Goggins. The Hoops. ISBN 0-7171-2121-6.
