= David C. Parkes =

British-American computer scientist

- Born: 1973 (age 52–53); Sidcup, Kent, England
- Education: Lincoln College, Oxford (MEng); University of Pennsylvania (PhD)
- Awards: Thouron Award (1995)
- Scientific career
- Fields: Artificial Intelligence, Multi-agent systems, Machine learning, Microeconomics
- Workplaces: Harvard University
- Website: www.eecs.harvard.edu/~parkes

David C. Parkes (born 1973) is a British-American computer scientist. He is the George F. Colony Professor of Computer Science and Co Faculty Director of the Harvard Data Science Initiative. From 2013–17, he was Area Dean for Computer Science. Parkes is a Fellow of the Association for the Advancement of Artificial Intelligence (AAAI) and the Association for Computing Machinery (ACM). He was named dean of the Harvard John A. Paulson School of Engineering and Applied Sciences in 2023.

== Education and academic career ==
Parkes was born in 1973 in Sidcup, Kent. He attended Holmes Chapel Comprehensive, Cheshire, then Lincoln College, Oxford, for an M.Eng. degree in Engineering and Computer Science. Having gained the Thouron Award to the University of Pennsylvania, he completed a Ph.D. in Computer and Information Science in 2001. Parkes worked as a research intern at the Xerox PARC, Palo Alto Research Center for summer 1997 and the IBM, T.J. Watson Research Center in the summer of 2000. In the spring of 2001 Parkes was lecturer of Operations and Information Management at the Wharton School, University of Pennsylvania.

He became an assistant professor of computer science at Harvard in 2001. He was awarded the John L. Loeb Associate Professor of Natural Sciences in 2005, with tenure as a Gordon McKay Professor of Computer Science in 2008. He was later appointed the George F. Colony Professor of Computer Science .

From September 2008 to January 2009 Parkes was a visiting professor of computer science at the Ecole Polytechnique Federale de Lausanne, Switzerland. For Lent and Easter terms 2012 he was a distinguished visiting scholar at Christ's College, Cambridge. He was appointed Harvard Area Dean for Computer Science (2013–17) which involved planning for the expansion of Engineering and Applied Sciences into Allston.

He is co-director of the Harvard Data Science Initiative 2017 and currently Co-Chair of the Faculty of Arts and Sciences (FAS) Data Science Masters, and Co-Chair of the Harvard Business Analytics Program.

Parkes was named dean of the Harvard John A. Paulson School of Engineering and Applied Sciences in 2023.

== Research work ==
Parkes founded the EconCS research group within Harvard School of Engineering and Applied Sciences. Known for his work on incentive engineering for computational systems, early research contributed to the design of combinatorial auctions, procedures for selling complex packages of goods. He has worked on decentralized mechanism design as well as mechanism design in dynamic environments, where resources, participants, and information local to participants vary over time to embrace the real-world uncertainty.

He served as technical advisor to CombineNet, Inc. (Pittsburgh, PA), 2001–2010, scientific advisor to Nanigans, Inc. (Boston, MA), 2011–2017, and since 2014 has served as acting chief scientist at Nift Networks, Inc. (Boston, MA).

He is a member of the scientific advisory committee of the Centrum Wiskunde & Informatica (CWI), Amsterdam, the Netherlands, from 2019. Parkes is a council member for the Computing Community Consortium of the Computing Research Association since 2018. He chaired the ACM Special Interest Group on Electronic Commerce between 2011 and 2015.

He is also currently associate editor of ACM Transactions on Economics and Computation, since 2011; INFORMS Journal on Computing, since 2009; and Autonomous Agents and Multi-Agent Systems, since 2007.

== Awards ==
- Association for Computing Machinery (ACM) Fellow, 2018
- ACM SIGAI Autonomous Agents Research Award, 2017
- Association for the Advancement of Artificial Intelligence (AAAI) Fellow, 2014
- Alfred P. Sloan Research Fellowship, 2005-2007
- Thouron Award, 1995
