= Partnership on AI =

Nonprofit coalition

Logo of the Partnership on AI

Partnership on Artificial Intelligence to Benefit People and Society, otherwise known as Partnership on AI (PAI), is a nonprofit coalition committed to the responsible use of artificial intelligence. Created in 2016, PAI grouped together organizations from over 90 companies and non-profits in order to explore best practice recommendations for the tech community.

== History ==
The Partnership on AI was publicly announced on September 28, 2016, with founding members Amazon, Facebook, Google, DeepMind, Microsoft, and IBM, with interim co-chairs Eric Horvitz of Microsoft Research and Mustafa Suleyman of DeepMind. In 2024, the Partnership reported that it included 126 partner organizations from academia, civil society, and industry based in 16 countries.

In January 2017, the Apple head of advanced development for Siri, Tom Gruber, joined the partnership on AI's board. In October 2017, Terah Lyons joined the Partnership on AI as the organization's founding executive director. Lyons brought to the organization her expertise in technology governance, with a specific focus in machine intelligence, AI, and robotics policy, having formerly served as Policy Advisor to the United States Chief Technology Officer Megan Smith. Lyons was succeeded by Partnership on AI board member Rebecca Finlay as interim executive director. Finlay was named CEO of Partnership on AI on October 26, 2021.

In October 2018, Baidu became the first firm from China to join the Partnership.

In November 2020 the Partnership on AI announced the AI Incident Database (AIID), which is a tool to identify, assess, manage, and communicate AI risk and harm.

In August 2021, the Partnership on AI submitted a response to the National Institute of Standards and Technology (NIST). The response provided examples of PAI's work related to AI risk management, such as the Safety Critical AI report on responsible publication of AI research, the ABOUT ML project on documentation and transparency in machine learning lifecycles, and the AI Incident Database. The response also highlighted how the AI Incident Database involves some of the minimum attributes in NIST's AI RMF, such as being consensus-driven, risk-based, adaptable, and consistent with other approaches to managing AI risk.

On October 26, 2021, Rebecca Finlay was named CEO.

In February 2023, the Partnership on AI launched a framework aimed at guiding the ethical development and use of synthetic media. This initiative was backed by a variety of initial partners, including Adobe, BBC, CBC/Radio-Canada, Bumble, OpenAI, TikTok, WITNESS, and synthetic media startups Synthesia, D-ID, and Respeecher. The framework, which emphasizes transparency, creativity, and safety, was the result of a year-long collaborative process involving contributions from a wide range of stakeholders, including synthetic media startups, social media platforms, news organizations, advocacy groups, academic institutions, policy professionals, and public commenters.

== Mission and principles ==
Partnership on AI has a multiple pronged approach to achieve impact. Their initiatives are separated into five different programs: AI and media integrity; AI, work, and the economy; justice, transparency, and accountability; inclusive research and design; and security for AI. These programs aim to produce value through specific outputs, methodological tools, and articles.

Through the program on AI & Media Integrity, PAI actively endeavors to establish best practices that ensure AI's positive influence on the global information ecosystem. Recognizing the potential for AI to facilitate harmful online content and amplify existing negative narratives, PAI is committed to mitigating these risks and fostering a responsible AI presence.

The AI, Labor, and the Economy program serves as a collaborative platform, uniting economists, worker representative organizations, and PAI's partners to formulate a cohesive response on how AI can contribute to an inclusive economic future. The recent release of PAI's "Guidelines for AI and Shared Prosperity" on June 7, 2023, outlines a blueprint for the judicious use of AI across various stages, guiding organizations, policymakers, and labor entities.

The Fairness, Transparency, and Accountability program, in conjunction with the Inclusive Research & Design program, strives to reshape the AI landscape towards justice and fairness. By exploring the intersections between AI and fundamental human values, the former establishes guidelines for algorithmic equity, explainability, and responsibility. Simultaneously, the latter empowers communities by providing guidelines on co-creating AI solutions, fostering inclusivity throughout the research and design process.

The Safety Critical AI program addresses the growing deployment of AI systems in pivotal sectors like medicine, finance, transportation, and social media. With a focus on anticipating and mitigating potential risks, the program brings together partners and stakeholders to develop best practices that span the entire AI research and development lifecycle. Notable initiatives include the establishment of the AI incident Database, formulation of norms for responsible publication, and the creation of the innovative AI learning environment SafeLife.

The association is also built of thematic foundations that drive Partnership on AI's focus. Atop the programs mentioned above, Partnership on AI looks to expand upon the social impact of AI, encouraging positive social utility. The organization has highlighted potential benefits of AI within public welfare, education, sustainability, etc. With these specific use cases, Partnership on AI is developing an ethical framework in which to analyze and AI's measure of ethical efficacy. The ethical framework places an emphasis on inclusive participatory practices that enhance equity in AI.

== Programs and initiatives ==
The Partnership on AI has been involved in several initiatives aimed at promoting the responsible use of AI. One of their key initiatives is the development of a framework for the safe deployment of AI models. This framework guides model providers in developing and deploying AI models in a manner that ensures safety for society and can adapt to evolving capabilities and uses.

In collaboration with DeepMind, the Partnership on AI has also launched a study to investigate the high attrition rates among women and minoritized individuals in tech.

Recognizing the importance of explainability in AI, the Partnership on AI hosted a one-day, in-person workshop focused on the deployment of "explainable artificial intelligence" (XAI). This event brought together experts from various industries to discuss and explore the concept of XAI.

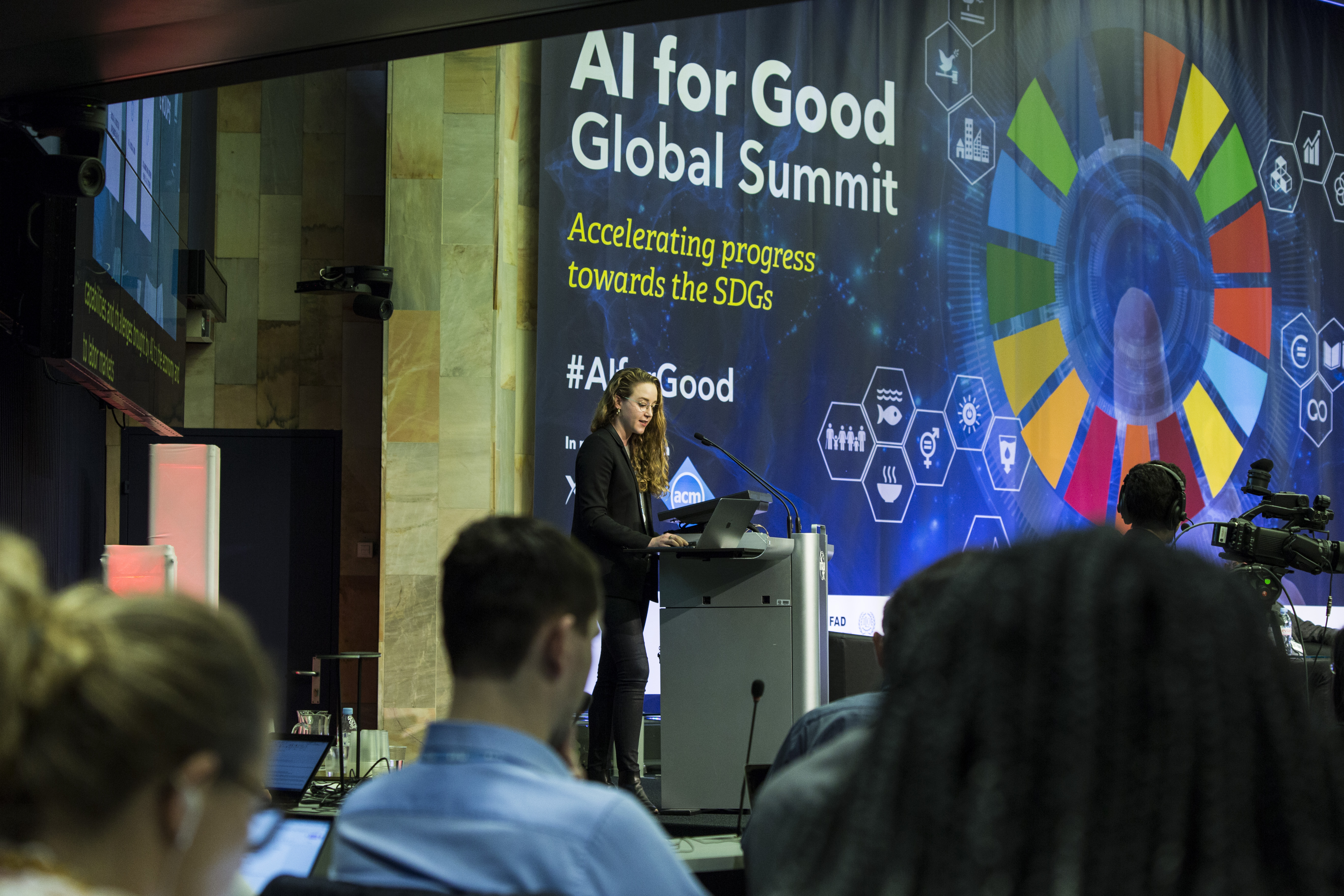
Terah Lyons, executive director, Partnership on AI speaking at the AI for Good Global Summit 2018 15–17 May 2018, Geneva

In an effort to support information integrity, the Partnership on AI collaborated with First Draft to investigate effective strategies for addressing deceptive content online. This initiative reflects the organization's methodical approach to identifying and promoting best practices in AI.

The Partnership on AI is also creating resources to facilitate effective engagement between AI practitioners and impacted communities.

In November 2020, the Partnership on AI announced the AI Incident Database (AIID) which shifted to a new special-purpose independent non-profit in 2022.

Most recently, PAI conducted the PAI's 2023 Policy Forum. This event, held in London, was a gathering of diverse stakeholders to explore recent trends in AI policy globally and strategies for ensuring AI safety. During the event, the Partnership on AI unveiled their "Guidance for Safe Foundation Model Deployment" for public feedback. This guidance, shaped by the Safety Critical AI Steering Committee and contributions from PAI's worldwide network, offers flexible principles for managing risks linked to large-scale AI implementation. Participants included policymakers, AI professionals, philanthropy and civil society members, and academic experts.

== Board of directors ==
As of December 2025, the Board of Directors of the Partnership on AI includes:

- Jatin Aythora, Board Vice-chair, BBC Research & Development
- Esha Bhandari, ACLU
- Christina Colclough, The Why Not Lab
- Natasha Crampton, Microsoft
- Jerremy Holland, Board Chair, Apple
- Angela Kane, Vienna Center for Disarmament and Non-Proliferation
- Helen King, GoogleDeepMind
- Vukosi Marivate, University of Pretoria
- Lori McGlinchey, Ford Foundation
- Lama Nachman
- Premkumar Natarjan, Capital One
- Rohit Prasad, Amazon
- Rob Sherman, Meta
- Brittany Smith, OpenAI
- Martin Tisné, Current AI
- Nicol Turner Lee, Brookings Institution
- Suresh Venkatasubramanian, Brown University

== Criticisms ==
In October 2020, Access Now, announced its official resignation from PAI in a letter. Access Now stated that it had found that there was an increasingly smaller role for civil society to play within PAI and that it had not influenced or changed the attitude of member companies or encouraged them to respond to or consult with civil society on a systematic basis. Access Now also expressed its disagreement with PAI's approach to AI ethics and risk assessment, and its advocacy for an outright ban on technologies that are fundamentally incompatible with human rights, such as facial recognition or other biometric technologies that enable mass surveillance.
