= Horace Peaslee =

American architect and landscape designer (1884–1959)

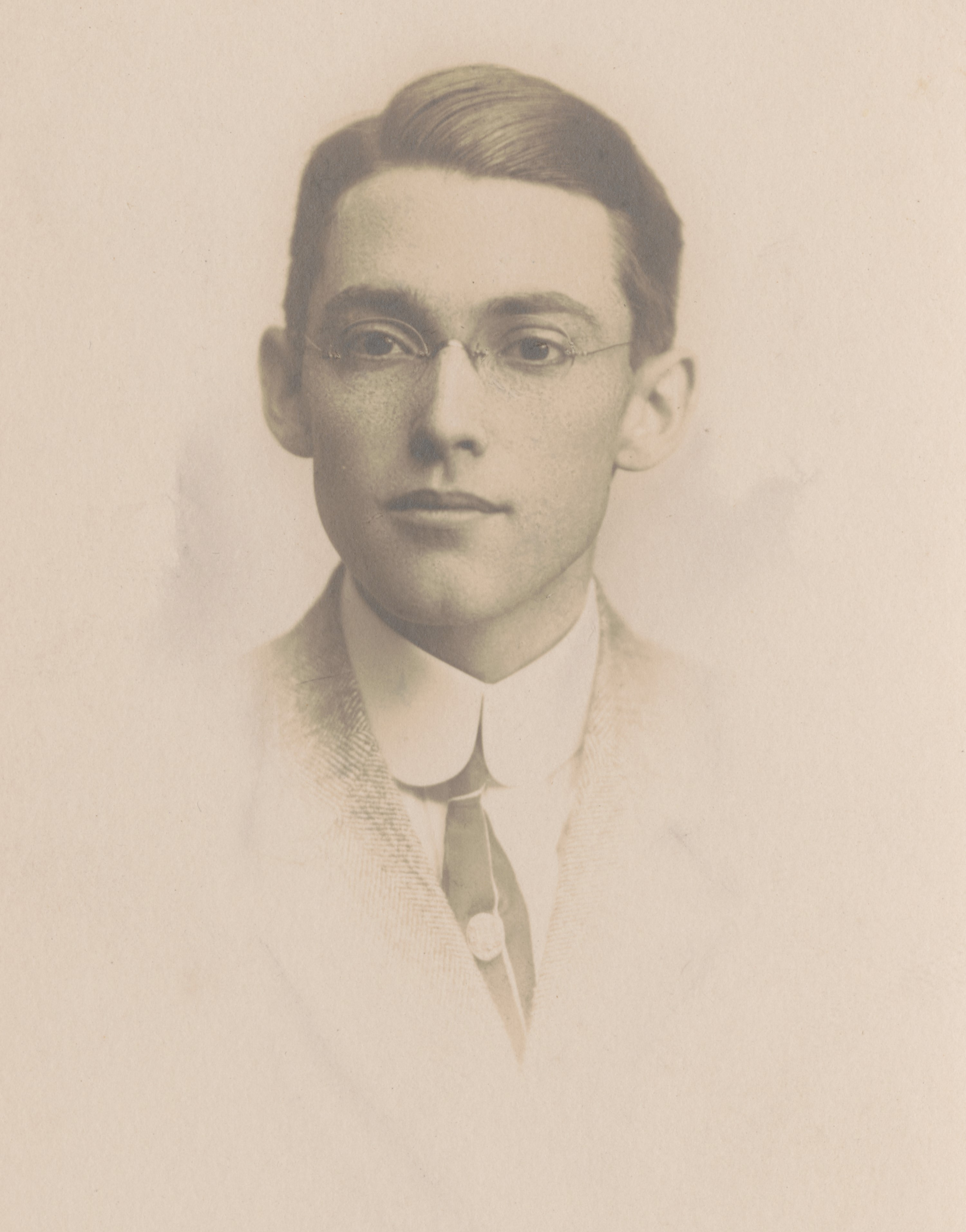
- 1910 class photograph
- Born: Horace Whittier Peaslee, Jr. November 9, 1884; Malden Bridge, New York
- Died: May 18, 1959 (aged 74); Washington, D.C.
- Resting place: Prospect Hill Cemetery; Valatie, New York
- Education: Cooper Union; Cornell University College of Architecture, Art, and Planning
- Occupation: Architect
- Years active: 1914–1959
- Spouse: Frances Monroe Hopkins
- Children: John Rider Peaslee
- Projects: St. John's Episcopal Church, Ashburton House, Eisenhower National Historic Site, Belle Grove Plantation, Christ Church, Townsend House, Dumbarton House, Friendship House, District of Columbia War Memorial, Edmund Burke
- Design: Meridian Hill Park, Iwo Jima Memorial, Colony Hill Historic District, Colonel William Robert Davis House, Montrose Park, Chatham Town Hall, Zero Milestone

Horace Whittier Peaslee Jr. (November 9, 1884 – May 18, 1959) was an American architect and landscape designer who primarily practiced in Washington, D.C. Born in New York, he attended Cooper Union and the Cornell University College of Architecture, Art, and Planning before moving to the nation's capital to work for the United States Office of Public Buildings and Grounds. During a tour of gardens in several European countries, he drew inspiration that was incorporated into Meridian Hill Park, an urban park in Washington, D.C., that is Peaslee's best known work. During World War I, he served as a captain in the United States Army Corps of Engineers and designed some of the temporary buildings of the National Mall.

Peaslee opened his own architectural practice in the late 1910s and designed residential, religious, educational, and public properties during his career. Most of his designs were examples of Colonial Revival architecture. Many of the buildings and parks he designed or renovated are listed on the National Register of Historic Places. Examples include St. John's Episcopal Church, the Eisenhower National Historic Site, the Townsend House, and Dumbarton House. In addition to buildings and parks, Peaslee designed the Zero Milestone and bases for the Marine Corps War Memorial (Iwo Jima Memorial) and Edmund Burke statue.

He was active in professional and social organizations, which included the Committee of 100 on the Federal City and National Capital Planning Commission, both of which he co-founded. He served as president of the American Institute of Architects's local chapter and later as its national vice president. Peaslee was instrumental in preserving Great Falls on the Potomac River in the 1920s and the National Capitol Columns that were removed from the United States Capitol in the 1950s. At the time of his death, Peaslee was serving as a consulting architect for the University of North Carolina at Chapel Hill.

== Early life ==
Horace Whittier Peaslee, Jr., was born November 9, 1884, in Malden Bridge, New York. He graduated from Chatham High School in 1902 and attended Cooper Union later that year. In 1906, Peaslee began his studies at Cornell University College of Architecture, Art, and Planning, and graduated four years later as valedictorian with a major in architecture and a minor in landscape architecture. He completed a one-year fellowship at Cornell in 1912. During his fellowship, Peaslee received an award from the Beaux Arts Society and his design of the Chatham Town Hall was chosen in a competition. His design appeared in an issue of The American Architect in 1913. According to Peaslee, his work on the town hall launched his career.

== Career ==
=== Landscape designs and military service ===
After his time at Cornell, Peaslee moved to Washington, D.C., where he began working as a landscape designer for the United States Office of Public Buildings and Grounds, assisting his Cornell lecturer George Burnap. He taught landscape architecture as a visiting fellow at the University of Illinois Urbana-Champaign from 1914 to 1916. In 1914, Peaslee and Burnap joined other officials from his office and members of the United States Commission of Fine Arts (CFA) on a tour of European gardens. They visited France, Italy, Spain, and Switzerland, seeking inspiration for planned gardens and parks in the United States. Peaslee studied the details of park designs in Europe, photographing and sketching water features and ornamentations. At the time, Burnap was designing Meridian Hill Park, an urban park in Washington, D.C., but was dismissed from his position in 1916. Peaslee was selected to replace him as lead designer, overseeing the park's construction from 1917 to 1935. His work on Meridian Hill Park would become his best known design.

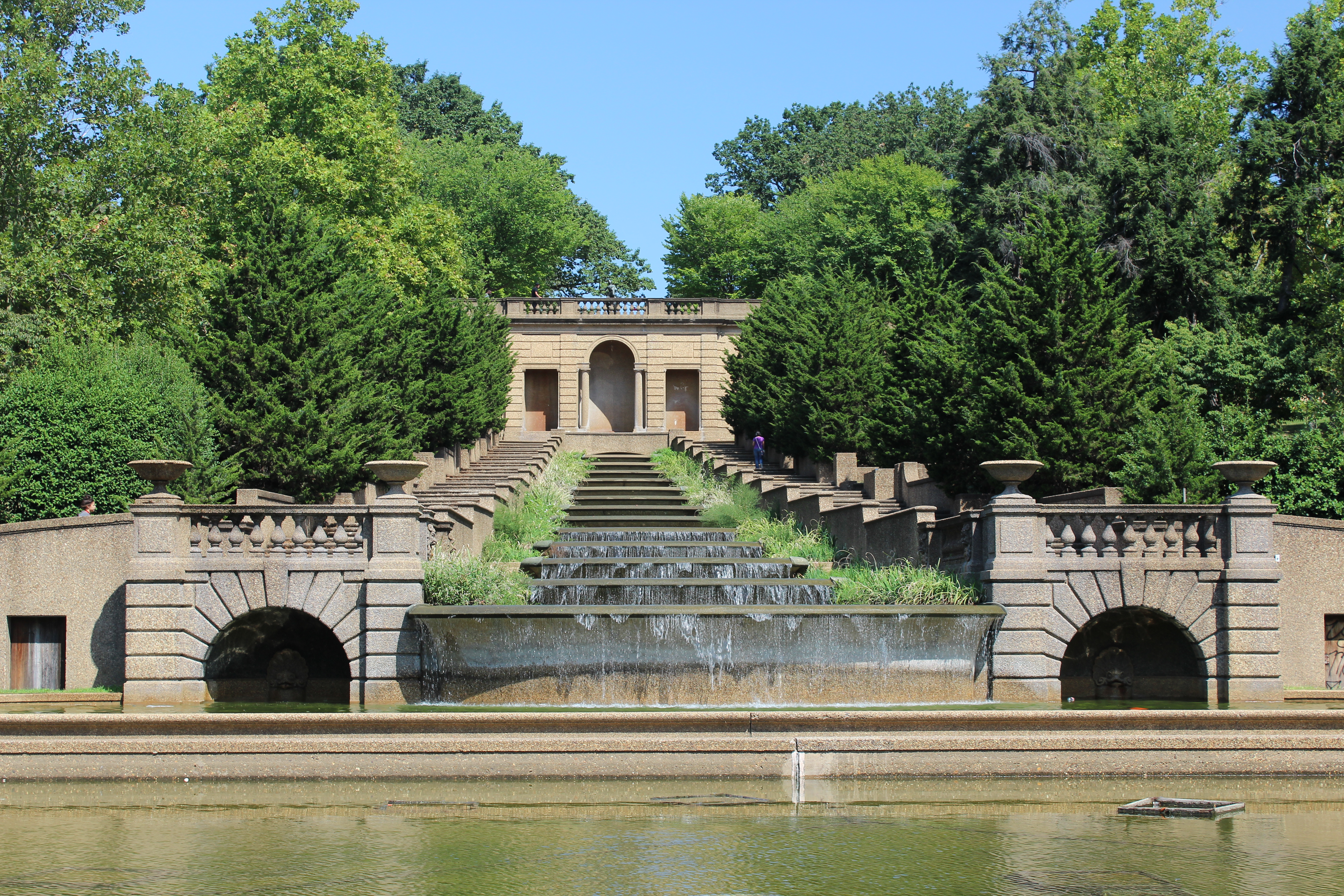
Meridian Hill Park in Washington, D.C. is Peaslee's best known design.

According to Peaslee, "From a beginning as Landscape Architectural Designer in 1915, through successive stages as Landscape Architect, and then Architect of the Office of Public Buildings and Grounds, and finally as Architect or Consulting Architect in independent practice, I either personally prepared, or directly supervised the preparation of all drawings for the visible construction of [Meridian Hill Park] and drafted the specifications covering visible design." He drew inspiration from the Villa Borghese gardens and Villa d'Este in Italy, intending to compliment the Renaissance Revival mansions being built along 16th Street NW. In addition to his work on Meridian Hill Park, in the late 1910s Peaslee designed the Field House in East Potomac Park, worked with Burnap to design Montrose Park in Georgetown, and designed the Fort Lincoln Cemetery chapel and gatehouse in Brentwood, Maryland. He authored eight articles in The Park International in the early 1920s which were focused on park building designs.

During World War I, Peaslee served as a captain in the United States Army Corps of Engineers, designing some of the temporary buildings on the National Mall and barracks at Camp Humphreys in Fairfax County, Virginia. Around this time Peaslee opened his own architectural practice in Washington, D.C. His designs and renovation works included residential, religious, educational, and public properties. One of his early employees was Rose Greely, who would later become the city's first woman to be a licensed architect. Another one of the city's early woman architects, Gertrude Sawyer, worked for Peaslee for around a decade.

=== Residential designs ===
Some of Peaslee's early residential designs included a house for Henry Berliner in 1922, located at 2829 Tilden Street NW in the Sheridan-Kalorama neighborhood, the Colonel William Robert Davis House in 1924, located at 3020 Albemarle Street NW in the Forest Hills neighborhood, 29 and 33 Kalorama Circle NW in 1925, and 3001 Garrison Street NW in 1928, also located in Forest Hills. The 25-acre (10 ha) estate on Garrison Street NW was the residence of Charles Hook Tompkins, whose construction company built the Lincoln Memorial Reflecting Pool and the White House East Wing, and now serves as the Peruvian ambassadorial residence. In 1925, Peaslee was hired to combine and expand two properties in Georgetown. The house, located at 3410 Volta Place NW, was expanded again several years later following designs by Greely.

In 1925, Peaslee designed a house for Colonel Clarence O. Sherrill at 2440 Kalorama Road NW in Sheridan-Kalorama, incorporating salvaged items from a demolished building. Two years later, Peaslee designed the Dr. W. Calhoun Sterling House, located at 2618 31st Street NW in the Woodland Normanstone neighborhood. He incorporated arches into Sterling's house that were salvaged from the Hay–Adams House, shortly before it was demolished and replaced with the Hay–Adams Hotel. Peaslee also repurposed a door from the Hay–Adams House into a residence he designed at 3014 Woodland Drive NW in 1928, also located in Woodland Normanstone.

Although many of Peaslee's residential designs were Colonial Revival, in 1927 he chose Art Deco when designing The Moorings apartment building at 1909 Q Street NW in Dupont Circle. From 1931 to 1941, Peaslee worked with Greely and architect Harvey Baxter in designing Colony Hill, a planned community in Washington, D.C., consisting of a few dozen houses. The community's first eleven Colonial Revival houses were designed by Peaslee, some of which were featured in The American Architect, House Beautiful, and Architectural Forum. Additional examples of residential buildings Peaslee designed include the house at 417 6th Street SE in Capitol Hill, built in 1937, and three houses in Forest Hills: 4600 Linnean Avenue NW, 3000 Garrison Street NW, and 5020 Linnean Avenue NW, built in 1931, 1938, and 1941, respectively.

=== School designs ===
Peaslee designed buildings for two schools in the Washington, D.C. area. The first was the Maret School when it moved to a new facility in Sheridan-Kalorama in 1923. The former school building located at 2118 Kalorama Road NW now houses the Embassy of Algeria. The second was the Landon School, which had moved in 1936 from 2131 Massachusetts Avenue NW to an estate in Bethesda, Maryland, previously owned by socialite Evalyn Walsh McLean. Peaslee, whose son attended the school, was hired to first restore and expand the estate's Andrews House. During the next three decades, he designed the school's first new building on campus, a gymnasium, and buildings for the lower school, administration, faculty residences, and academic center.

=== Monument and public art designs ===
Peaslee designed the base and landscaping of the Marine Corps War Memorial (Iwo Jima Memorial) in Arlington Ridge Park.

In 1921, Peaslee designed the Dante Alighieri statue landscaping in Meridian Hill Park. Several years later, he designed a base for the Noyes Armillary Sphere, also located in Meridian Hill Park. In 1923, Peaslee designed a base for the Edmund Burke statue, located on Massachusetts Avenue NW in Burke Park. That same year the Zero Milestone, located in President's Park south of the White House, was dedicated. Peaslee had been chosen to design the monument by Dr. S. M. Johnson, an advocate for the Good Roads Movement. Peaslee was one of five finalists in a competition to design the Tomb of the Unknown Soldier at Arlington National Cemetery, but architect Lorimer Rich was chosen in 1927.

Peaslee and Nathan C. Wyeth served as associate architects on Frederick H. Brooke's design of the District of Columbia War Memorial, which was built on the National Mall in 1931. In the 1950s, Peaslee was chosen to design the Marine Corps War Memorial (more commonly known as the Iwo Jima Memorial) along with sculptor Felix de Weldon, based on the photograph Raising the Flag on Iwo Jima by Joe Rosenthal. Peaslee also designed the 7.5-acre (3 ha) surrounding area, including a reviewing stand, pathways, and parking. In order to match the 10-foot (0.3 m) base with the volcanic sand color of the large sculpture, Peaslee used black diabase granite from a Swedish quarry, mixing it with black sand and concrete.

=== Restorations ===
In addition to designing new buildings and landscape work, Peaslee also took part in restoration projects. Working with architect Fiske Kimball from 1928 to 1932, Peaslee's first major renovation project was the headquarters of the National Society of the Colonial Dames of America, which had purchased Dumbarton House in Georgetown. Around this time Peaslee also oversaw exterior and interior renovations of Belle Grove Plantation's manor house near Middletown, Virginia. Additional projects in the 1930s included reconstruction of the original 1676 Maryland State House in St. Mary's City, Maryland, and renovations and additions to the Friendship House in Capitol Hill.

In the 1950s, Peaslee oversaw restoration of two churches designed by noted architect Benjamin Henry Latrobe: the Christ Church in Capitol Hill, and St. John's Episcopal Church, adjacent to Lafayette Square. His work at St. John's included extensive renovations of the recently purchased Ashburton House, which was converted into a parish hall. During the same decade Peaslee oversaw the restoration and expansion of the Bowie-Sevier House in Georgetown, and a major renovation project of the Townsend House in Dupont Circle, after it was purchased by the Cosmos Club.

== Personal life and legacy ==
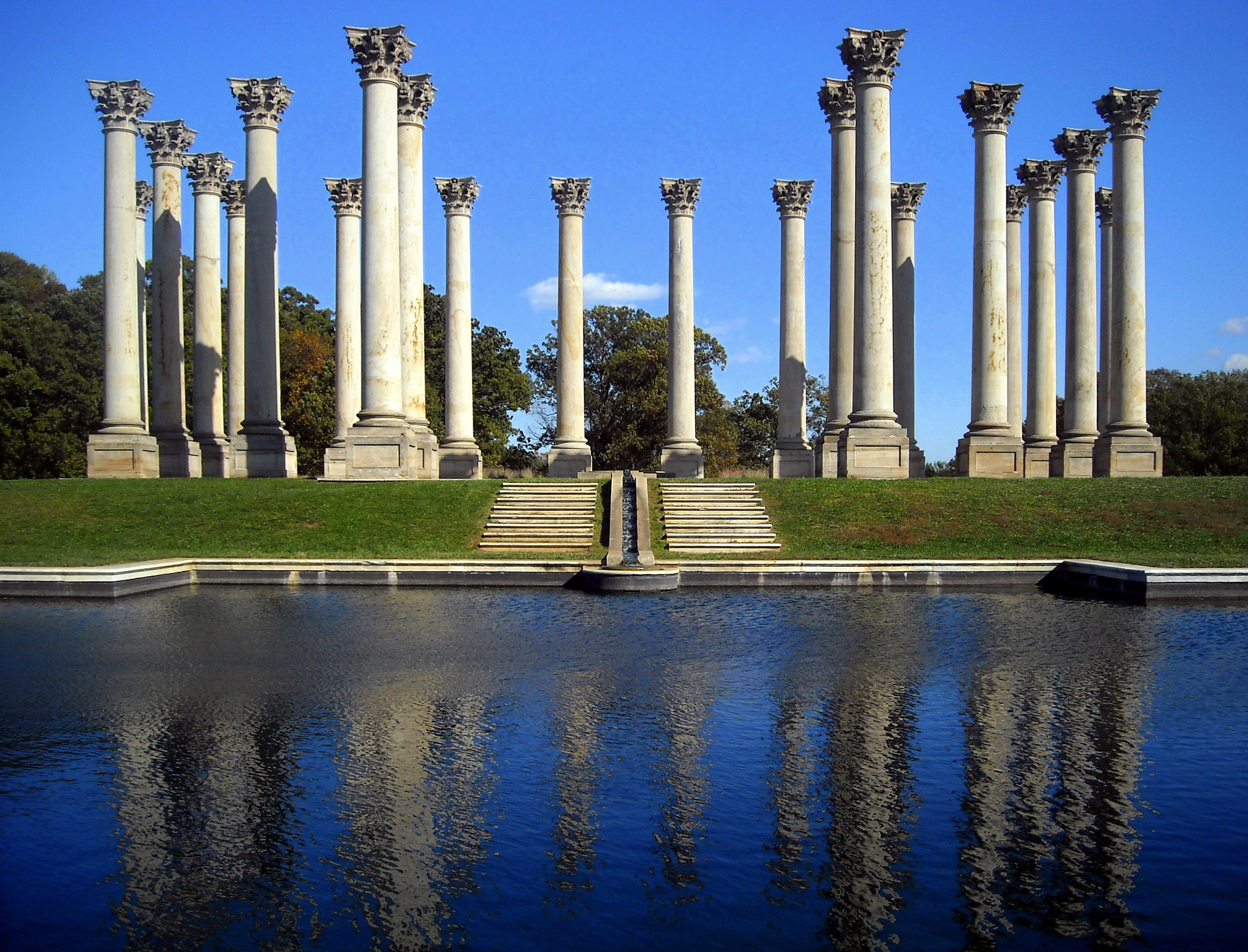
Peaslee helped preserve the National Capitol Columns now located at the United States National Arboretum.

Peaslee married Frances Monroe Hopkins on December 28, 1928, with whom he had one child, John Rider Peaslee. The couple lived at 1234 19th Street NW in Dupont Circle until her death in 1958. Horace died from a heart attack the following year on May 18, shortly after receiving an award from the Washington Board of Trade for his work on the Episcopal Church Home (Bowie-Sevier House). At the time of his death, Peaslee was serving as consulting architect for the University of North Carolina at Chapel Hill. He had recently concluded his work as supervising landscape architect of President Dwight D. Eisenhower's estate near Gettysburg, Pennsylvania. Peaslee had lobbied for preservation of the United States Capitol's east portico in 1958, but was unsuccessful. He was able to salvage the National Capitol Columns that were going to be demolished in the expansion project, which were later installed at the United States National Arboretum.

Throughout his career, Peaslee was actively involved in several architectural and historic preservation organizations. He served as a committee chair for the CFA from 1923 to 1924, co-founded the Committee of 100 on the Federal City in 1923 and National Capital Planning Commission in 1924, and vice-chair of the local Committee on City Planning from 1933 to 1934. He lobbied for construction of the George Washington Memorial Parkway, passage of the Shipstead-Luce Act, and preservation of Great Falls when a proposal was made in the 1920s to build a power station on the Potomac River.

Working with fellow architects from Washington, D.C., Peaslee helped establish the Architects' Advisory Council, which reviewed local design applications, and the Allied Architects of Washington, D.C., Inc., a group that collectively submitted designs for large projects. One of these projects, the Longworth House Office Building, was completed in 1933. In 1929, he was elected president of the American Institute of Architects's (AIA) local chapter and served as a national vice president of the AIA from 1930 to 1934. He was also an honorary member of the American Society of Landscape Architects. In addition to professional organizations, Peaslee was a member of the Cosmos Club, the Columbia Historical Society in New York, the University Club, the Cornell Club, the American Legion, the Dupont Circle Citizens Association, and St. John's Episcopal Church.

According to architectural historian and author Kim Prothro Williams, Peaslee's "architecture and landscape work and professional and civic activism in the realm of urban planning, historic preservation, and architectural design review has significantly shaped the development of the District of Columbia." Many of the buildings and parks Peaslee designed or renovated have been designated historic landmarks listed on the National Register of Historic Places (NRHP). Meridian Hill Park, St. John's Episcopal Church, Ashburton House, the Eisenhower National Historic Site, and Belle Grove Plantation are National Historic Landmarks. Christ Church, Chatham Town Hall, the Townsend House, Dumbarton House, Friendship House, the Edmund Burke statue, the District of Columbia War Memorial, Montrose Park, the Colonel William Robert Davis House, the Colony Hill Historic District, and Arlington Ridge Park are also listed on the NRHP.
