= Krug Park =

Krug Park may refer to:

- Krug Park (St. Joseph, Missouri), public park
- Krug Park (amusement park), former amusement park
