= George Burnap =

American landscape architect (1885–1938)

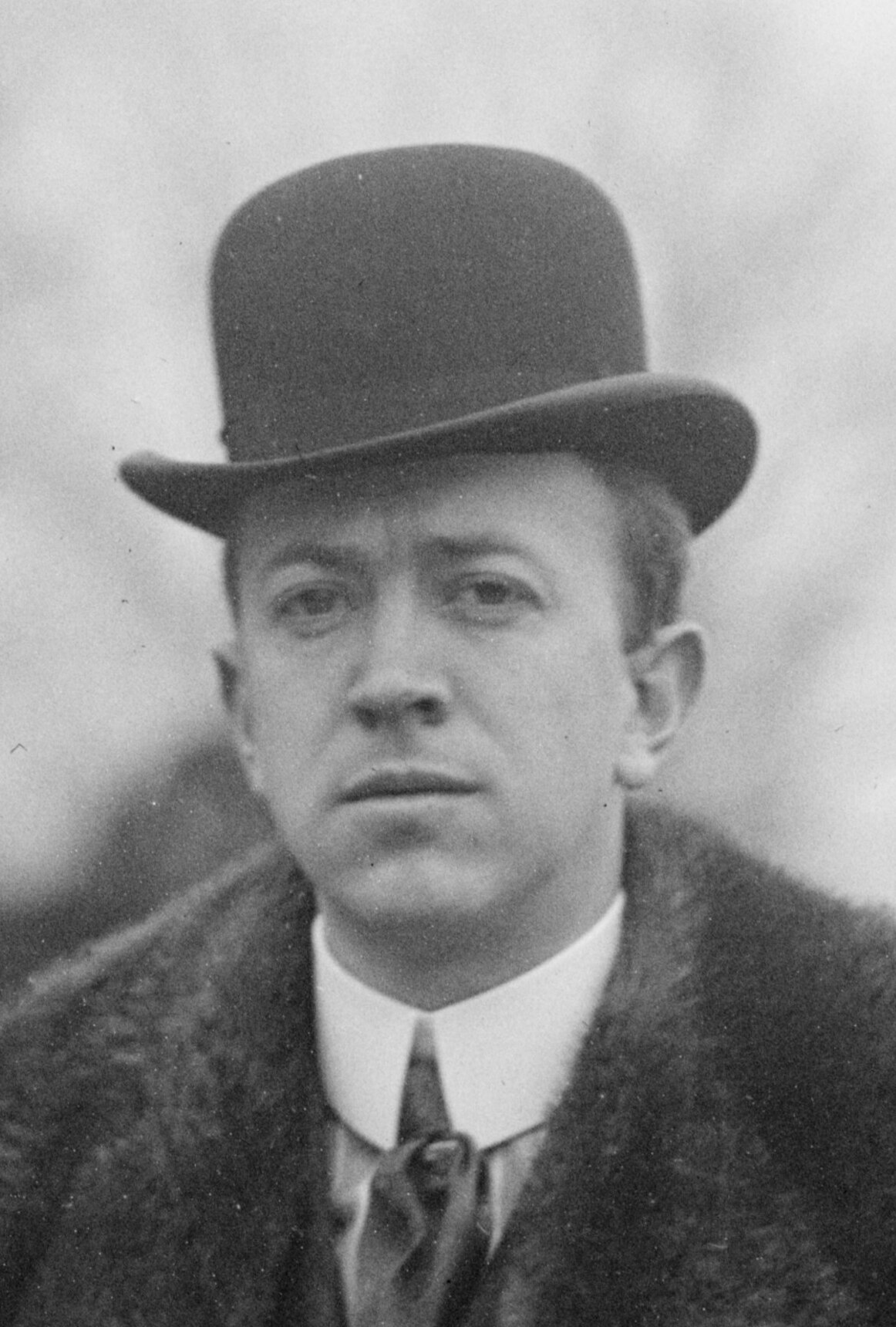
- Burnap in 1914
- Born: George Elberton Burnap; December 28, 1885; Hopkinton, Massachusetts
- Died: June 17, 1938 (aged 52); Washington, D.C.
- Resting place: Evergreen Cemetery; Hopkinton, Massachusetts
- Education: Massachusetts Institute of Technology; Cornell University; University of Paris
- Occupation: Architect
- Spouse: Jeanette Gallinger
- Design: Meridian Hill Park, Montrose Park, White House Rose Garden, East Potomac Park, St. Joseph Parkway, Hagerstown City Park

George Elberton Burnap (December 28, 1885 – June 17, 1938) was an American landscape architect. Born in Massachusetts, he attended the Massachusetts Institute of Technology and Cornell University before being appointed lead architect in the Office of Public Buildings and Grounds (OPBG) in Washington, D.C. During his years with the OPBG, he designed the first White House Rose Garden, Montrose Park, Rawlins Park, landscaping and roadways in East Potomac Park, and initiated the planting of Japanese cherry trees along the Tidal Basin. His most well-known design was of Meridian Hill Park, a large urban park built on elevated land. Due to disagreements over his salary and outside work, Burnap was dismissed in 1916. His former student, Horace Peaslee, oversaw the completion of Meridian Hill Park.

Burnap later designed parks in numerous states, including St. Joseph Parkway in St. Joseph, Missouri, where he worked for several years, and Hagerstown City Park in Hagerstown, Maryland. He was also a landscape consultant to the Office of Engineering Commissioners and Veterans Bureau, authored Parks: Their Design, Equipment and Use, and was a contributing writer to American Architecture and Building News and Architectural Record. He continued his education later in life, earning an urban planning diploma from the University of Paris's graduate school. Burnap married his American wife in Paris, but they separated a few months later. Their divorce proceedings and alimony court battle were the subjects of numerous articles in local newspapers. He died in 1938 and was buried in his home state.

== Early life ==
George Elberton Burnap was born on December 28, 1885, in Hopkinton, Massachusetts, the youngest of five children born to Charles Russell Burnap and Belinda Elizabeth (Gerry) Burnap. After graduating from high school in Everett, Massachusetts, Burnap attended the Massachusetts Institute of Technology (MIT). During his time at MIT majoring in landscape architecture, Burnap studied under Constant-Désiré Despradelle and Guy Lowell. After graduating in 1906, Burnap attended Cornell University, where he earned his Master of Arts in rural art. While studying at Cornell, he was a lecturer in six undergraduate courses, assisting Bryant Fleming and William Charles Barker.

== Career ==
In May 1910, Secretary Jacob M. Dickinson appointed Burnap to be the lead landscape architect in the Office of Public Buildings and Grounds (OPBG) in Washington, D.C., succeeding George H. Brown, the city's first landscape gardener. After taking the position, Burnap asked a former student at Cornell, Horace Peaslee, to be his assistant landscape designer. Burnap's job included overseeing the city's public parks and monuments. In 1912, he initiated the planting of Japanese cherry trees along the Tidal Basin and plans for roadways and landscaping in East Potomac Park. The following year, Burnap worked with First Lady Ellen Axson Wilson to design the first White House Rose Garden, splitting the previous garden into two sections. From 1913, to 1915, Burnap and Peaslee designed Montrose Park in Georgetown, incorporating elements from Richard Parrott's 19th-century estate.

Burnap joined Peaslee and members of the United States Commission of Fine Arts (CFA) in 1914 on a tour of gardens in France, Germany, Italy, Spain, and Switzerland, seeking inspiration for upcoming projects. The largest project Burnap worked on was Meridian Hill Park, a large urban park on elevated land that had been purchased by the United States Congress in 1910. The CFA approved Burnap's plans in 1914 which included Italianate and Baroque design elements. The initial plan included elaborate gardens and fountains on the park's upper and lower portions. Construction of the park began in 1915. The following year Burnap authored Parks: Their Design, Equipment and Use, the first of a planned four-volume series, and redesigned Rawlins Park.

In addition to his work on the city's public parks, Burnap worked on private landscaping projects. Examples include gardens at the Catholic University of America's Sisters' College and at the residence of psychiatrist Loren B.T. Johnson, 2108 16th Street NW, which now houses the Embassy of Angola. Although Burnap completed these projects during his time off, his superior Colonel William Wright Harts informed him it was interfering with his duty at the OPBG. Harts gave Burnap an ultimatum, to stop accepting private work or face suspension. Burnap declined, saying his annual government salary of $2,400 was inadequate. He was suspended without pay, and despite an appeal, dismissed from service in August 1916. After Burnap was dismissed, Peaslee took over as lead architect of Meridian Hill Park. While keeping some of Burnap's designs, including the Cascading Waterfall and fountain in the park's lower portion, the plan for formal gardens in the upper portion was replaced with an open grassy area.

In 1917, Burnap began working for the city government of St. Joseph, Missouri, but left in 1920 due to budget shortfalls in his department. That same year an exhibition of Burnap's garden designs took place at the Arts Club of Washington. In the 1920s, he designed parks in Council Bluffs, Iowa, Granville, New York, Greenwood, South Carolina, Omaha, Nebraska, and Petersburg, Virginia. He was a contributing editor to American Architecture and Building News and Architectural Record, worked as a landscape consultant to the Office of Engineering Commissioners and Veterans Bureau (precursor to the United States Department of Veterans Affairs), and designed landscaping for the Gallinger Municipal Hospital and Occoquan Workhouse.

While still working on various projects, Burnap traveled to France where he studied at the University of Paris, earning an Urban Planning diploma (le Diplôme d'urbanisme) in 1923 from the graduate School of Advanced Urban Studies (École des hautes études urbaines). He also worked with French landscape architect Jacques Gréber. Burnap returned to St. Joseph in 1924 after the city funded his design projects, including Hyde Park and the St. Joseph Parkway. In 1928, he designed Hagerstown City Park in Hagerstown, Maryland, which includes lagoons, islands, and the Washington County Museum of Fine Arts. That same year he designed the grounds of McKinley Technical High School in Washington, D.C.

== Personal life ==
On December 6, 1924, Burnap married Jeanette Gallinger, widow of Senator Jacob H. Gallinger's son, Ralph. The couple were married at the Church of the Star (l'Eglise d'Etoile) in Paris. They only lived together for less than four months, maintaining separate lives after Burnap left France. In 1926, local newspapers began publishing reports of the ensuing court battles over divorce proceedings and alimony. Their legal battle over alimony reached the District of Columbia Court of Appeals, which ruled in Burnap's favor in 1929. Burnap died on June 17, 1938, at the home of his sister, wife of businessman Edward Hamlin Everett. His funeral service took place in Boston and he was buried at Evergreen Cemetery in Hopkinton.

== Bibliography ==
- Parks: Their Design, Equipment and Use, Burnap, George, J. B. Lippincott & Co., 1916, OCLC 1594029
