= Netherlands Carillon =

Bell instrument in Arlington, Virginia, US

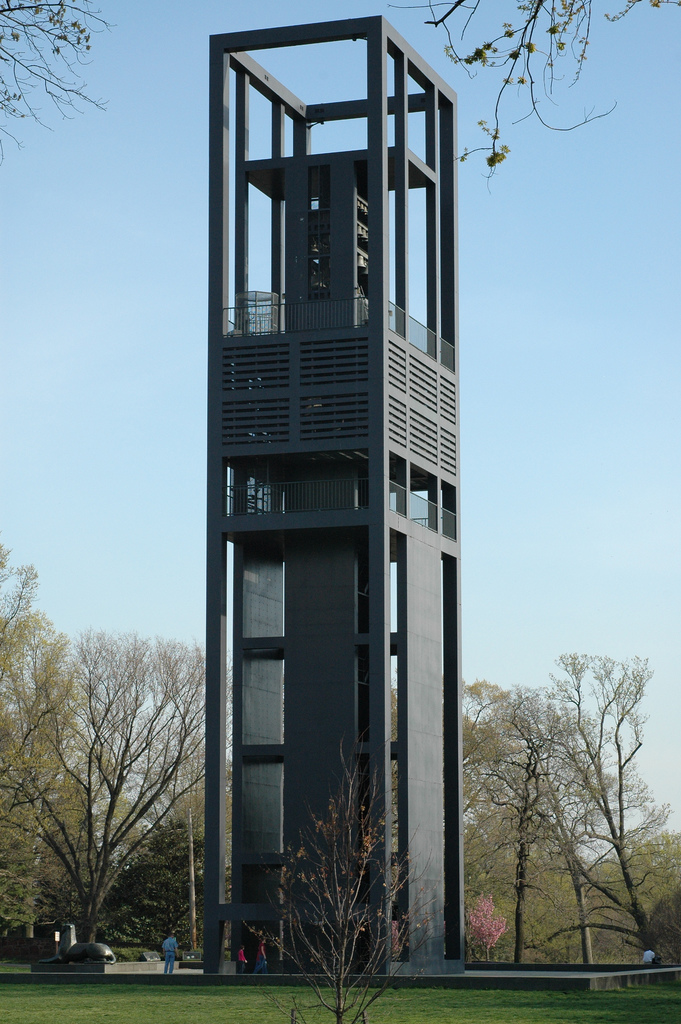
- The Netherlands Carillon viewed from the northwest.
- Interactive map of the Netherlands Carillon area

General information
- Type: Tower housing a carillon
- Architectural style: Modernist
- Location: Between Arlington National Cemetery and the Marine Corps War Memorial in Arlington, Virginia, United States
- Coordinates: 38°53′18″N 77°04′10″W
- Construction started: circa 1958
- Inaugurated: May 5, 1960
- Renovated: 1983, 1994–95, 2019–21
- Renovation cost: $0.3 million (1983); $1.4 million (1994–95); $5.8 million (2019–21)
- Owner: National Park Service

Height
- Architectural: 127 feet (39 m)
- Top floor: 83 feet (25 m)
- Observatory: 60 feet (18 m)

Technical details
- Floor count: 2
- Lifts/elevators: 0
- Grounds: 93 square feet (8.6 m^{2})

Design and construction
- Architect: Joost W. C. Boks
- Architecture firm: Petit & Fritsen
- Other designers: Petit & Fritsen, Royal Eijsbouts, Van Bergen (bell casting, 1952–53)

Renovating team
- Renovating firm: Petit & Fritsen (bell casting, 1995, 2020)

Website
- home.nps.gov/gwmp/learn/historyculture/netherlandscarillon.htm

The Netherlands Carillon is a 127-foot (39-m)-tall campanile housing a 53-bell carillon located in Arlington County, Virginia, United States.

The instrument and tower were given in the 1950s "From the People of the Netherlands to the People of the United States of America" to thank the United States for its contributions to the liberation of the Netherlands in 1945 and for its economic aid in the years after. The Netherlands Carillon is a historic property listed on the National Register of Historic Places as part of Arlington Ridge Park, which is part of the George Washington Memorial Parkway. It is owned and operated by the National Park Service.

The carillon is situated on a ridge overlooking the Potomac River and Washington, D.C., and it provides expansive views of the National Mall, West Potomac Park (its original, temporary location), and Arlington National Cemetery. Its adjacency to the Marine Corps War Memorial to the north and Arlington National Cemetery to the south draws 1.2 million visitors annually, including recreational visitors from Rosslyn's residential areas.

Throughout the day, the carillon automatically plays the Westminster Quarters. On significant days of the year in Dutch and American culture, it plays automated concerts, and from June to August, the director-carillonist Edward Nassor hosts a concert series whereby visiting carillonists perform weekly concerts on the instrument.

== History ==
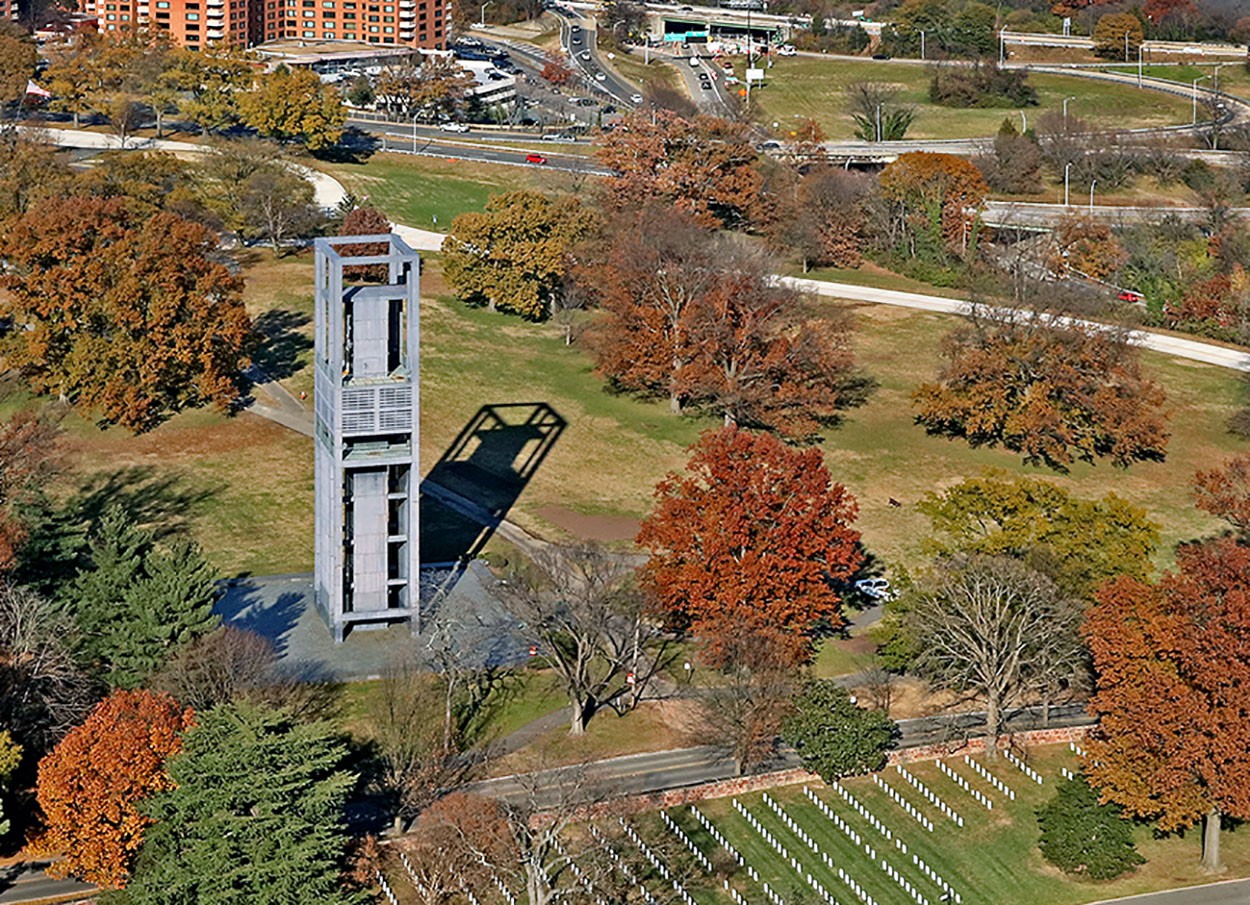
Netherlands Carillon in Arlington County, Virginia

In late 1951, Govert L. Verheul, press officer of the Dutch Ministry of Economic Affairs in The Hague, proposed that the Netherlands present a gift to the United States to commemorate their actions during and after World War II and as a symbol of the two countries' lasting friendship. He came up with the idea of gifting a carillon when washing dishes one night and accidentally clinking wine glasses together. Consequently, a large-scale fundraising campaign was launched, and it received an enthusiastic response. It was eventually endorsed by Queen Juliana. On April 4, 1952, she visited the United States to present a small silver bell to President Harry S. Truman as a token of the carillon that was to come. In ceremonies at Meridian Hill Park in Washington, D.C., the queen spoke of the importance of the small bells of the future instrument:

To achieve real harmony, justice should be done also to the small and tiny voices, which are not supported by the might of their weight. Mankind could learn from this. So many voices in our troubled world are still unheard. Let that be an incentive for all of us when we hear the bells ringing.

Two years later, 49 bells arrived and were installed in West Potomac Park, where they were formally accepted by the United States. The Netherlands did not initially have the money to provide a proper campanile for the carillon, so it was housed in a temporary structure. Gerrit Rietveld, a Dutch furniture designer and architect, was approached to design the campanile, but he was eventually removed from the project because of his perceived communist sympathies. Instead, Dutch architect Joost W. C. Boks designed the carillon's permanent home. The tower was erected just north of Arlington National Cemetery and south of the Marine Corps War Memorial and was completed by early 1960. The carillon and new tower received a formal dedication ceremony on May 5, 1960, or the fifteenth anniversary of Dutch Liberation Day. The inaugural concert was performed by renowned carillonist Charles T. Chapman.

A tulip garden was planted in a circular bed immediately to the east of the plaza in 1964, also a gift from the Netherlands. A small successional woodland to the southwest forms the backdrop to the carillon as a result of the 1960s National Capital Parks Planting Plan. Additional landscaped beds in the form of musical notes were planted in 1967 and 1972 as part of Lady Bird Johnson's Beautification Program, with a variety of annuals and perennials, in addition to tulips. The program also planted the horseshoe of trees for the campanile's backdrop.

After its dedication in 1960, the carillon was seldom played. It only performed for Easter Sunday services sponsored by the Arlington Ministerial Association. The few performances were by Frank Péchin Law. He assumed the position of director-carillonist after his instrumental involvement in establishing the "Summer Series of Recitals on the Netherlands Carillon" in July 1963, sponsored by the US Department of the Interior. Every Saturday from July through August, the carillon is played by a guest carillonist, invited by the director-carillonist. In the early 1970s, the Netherlands Carillon was repainted from a dark bronze to a gray blue color. In 1983, less than twenty-five years after the carillon's construction and after years of pressure from Mr. Law, a major renovation was undertaken to address deterioration of the tower's steel panels. The National Park Service announced a $300,000 (equivalent to $1,060,000 in 2025) renovation plan for the instrument in 1981, but budget issues delayed the project. Again, the tower was repainted the light gray blue color, neither time with the approval of the Commission of Fine Arts. Upon Mr. Law's death in 1985, the Netherlands Carillon fell silent until Edward M. Nassor took over the position of director-carillonist in 1987.

In the years before the fiftieth anniversary of Dutch Liberation Day in 1995, a group of prominent Dutch businessmen established a foundation to assist in the refurbishment of the carillon and tower, which had not seen major care since 1970. They were motivated by the significance of the meaning behind the Netherlands Carillon to lead this effort. By teaming up with the Netherlands Chamber of Commerce in the United States, the Netherland-America Foundation, and the government of the Netherlands, approximately $1,400,000 (equivalent to $3,000,000 in 2025) was raised for the project to move forward. The tower was closed for modernization changes, and the original dark bronze color of the tower was restored. The bells were transported to the Netherlands to be repaired by Royal Eijsbouts, except for the largest thirteen, which remained in the tower and were repaired in place. The original playing keyboard was replaced. Royal Eijsbouts also cast a fiftieth bell in celebration of the fiftieth anniversary of Dutch liberation. It was presented by the Dutch prime minister Wim Kok to the U.S. president Bill Clinton on February 28, 1995, and the renovated carillon was dedicated on May 5, 1995. After receiving the new bell, President Clinton commented on its significance:

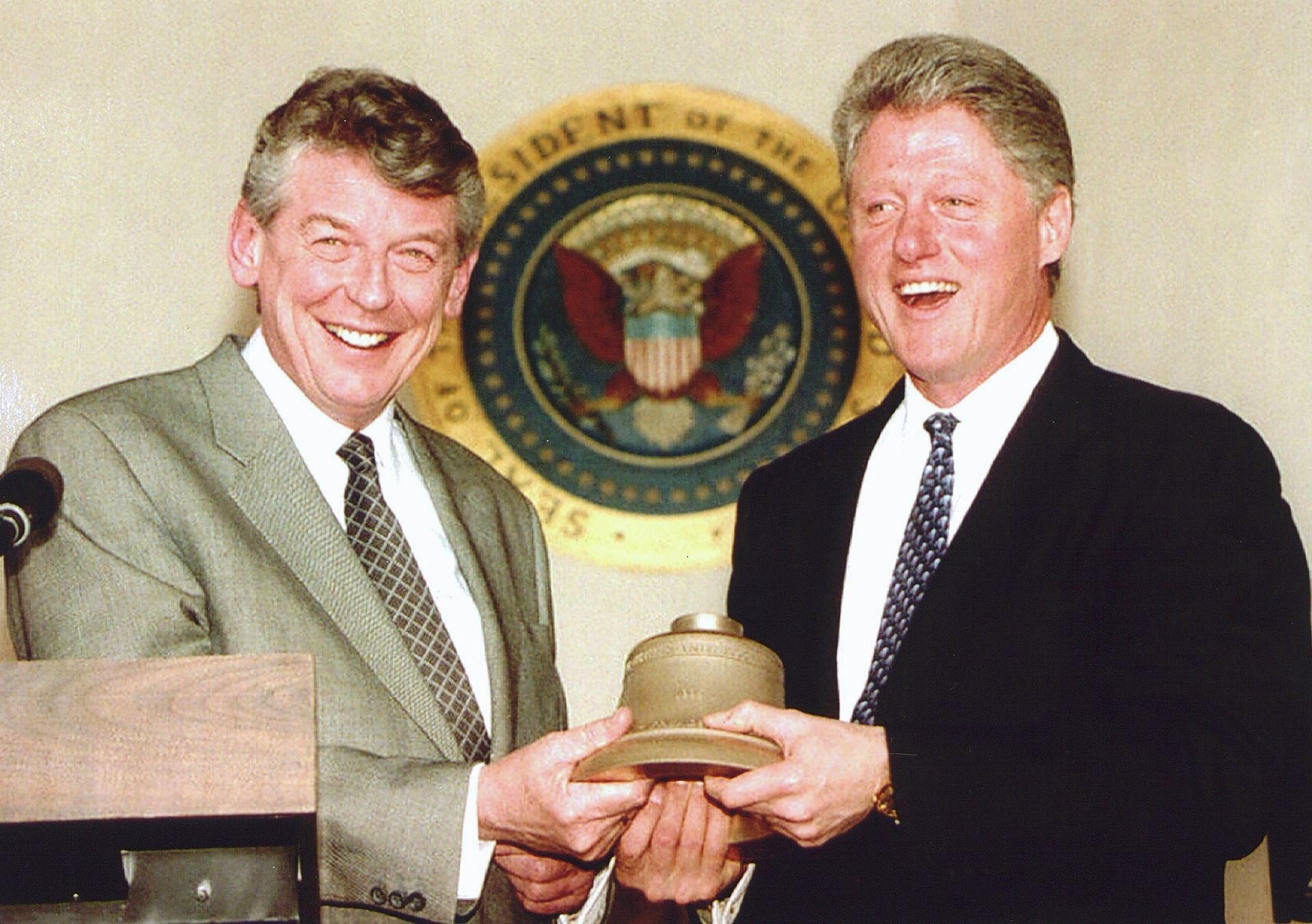
Dutch prime minister Wim Kok and U.S. president Bill Clinton pose with the Netherlands Carillon's 50th bell, February 28, 1995

As we move forward to meet the challenges of this new century, it is fitting that we and our Dutch friends will be reminded of the common cause we shared fifty years ago by the sound of this beautiful new bell. May it also be sounding fifty years from now and even beyond.

The Netherlands Carillon found itself in bad shape again less than twenty years later. Due to severe rusting and fears of structural instability, the tower was closed to the public in the early 2010s. In 2016, the National Park Service and Royal Netherlands Embassy launched a campaign to fundraise money for a $5,800,000 (equivalent to $7,800,000 in 2025) restoration of the carillon. The Park Service committed $4 million. In October 2019, the third renovation of the carillon was officially launched. The National Park Service was tasked with work on the tower, while the Royal Netherlands Embassy was tasked with work on the carillon. The carillon was transported to the Royal Eijsbouts foundry and arrived on December 3, 2019. In celebration of the Dutch "75 Years of Freedom" campaign, the carillon received three new bells with each dedicated to an American who had a significant impact on Dutch and American society: General George C. Marshall, Martin Luther King Jr., and Eleanor Roosevelt. The addition of these three bells converted the carillon to a concert pitch instrument and upgraded it to "grand carillon" status. The tower required extensive restorative work to the steel plates and inner structure of the tower. Additional supports were installed to account for the added weight of the three new bells.

The first carillon at the Arlington National Cemetery was installed by Amvets in 1949 and dedicated by President Truman.

== Design and symbolism ==
=== Carillon ===
In the early 1950s, there were three major Dutch bell founders: Van Bergen, Royal Eijsbouts and Petit & Fritsen. In order to avoid showing favoritism, all three founders were asked to cast the original forty-nine bells jointly and anonymously between 1952 and 1953. The total weight of the bells is 61,403 pounds (27,852 kg), ranging from 12,654 pounds (5,740 kg) for the bourdon (largest) bell and 35 pounds (16 kg) for the smallest. The bells are constructed of a bronze alloy of approximately four-fifths copper and one-fifth tin. Each bell carries an emblem signifying a group within Dutch society. The verses cast on the bells were composed by the Dutch poet, Ben van Eysselsteijn.

Original 49 Bells' Dedications and Inscriptions
	Note (pre–2020)	Pitch (note post-2020)	Dedication	Verse inscription (in English)
1	B♭	G	Netherlands Antilles	Islands over the ocean shining in the sun— your wishes, hope and wanting, Antilles, shall ring out in my voice.
2	C	A	South Holland	Shoulder to shoulder in Union is strength. We join hands working and praying. Everybody must see: We are with you, free America.
3	D	B	North Holland	You brought deliverance after the fearful dark of hunger, pain and shame: My bell tolls the gratitude of free Holland.
4	D♯	C	Overyssel	The lion striding of the Yssel unites what was once divided and binds us in holy understanding: unity is built on harmony.
5	E	C♯	Gelderland	Voice cast from fire and steel echo the old call: Gelre! Gelre! With all out might, we shall defend our freedom.
6	F	D	North Brabant	From Duke John to our day Brabant has taught us: freedom can be suppressed but it will rise again.
7	F♯	D♯	Groningen	Voice of town and country, sound through me— help from shores across the sea fought for your liberation. For a world without shame free of fear and free of chains we battle.
8	G	E	Utrecht	Tower of the grey bishopric which points towards heaven. Thus pointing, hoping, we fought to free the seat of Holland’s unity.
9	G♯	F	Limburg	High on the mountain, deep in the nine around the silent shrine of St. Servatius: Limburg! I will be your voice.
10	A	F♯	Friesland	Proud Friesland says: Bear your fate in silence and strength; Be no one’s master, no one’s slave and kneel for the Lord only.
11	A♯	G	Zealand	Enemy and water regretted it later: The victor of today thinks himself a hero, but tomorrow he is beaten himself.
12	B	G♯	Drenthe	Once undergrowth, heath and shifting sands, now the provider of Dutch rye; This miracle was wrought by Drenthe.
13	C	A	Mining industry	I call, I am the voice of those who wring warmth, light and prosperity from the depth of the earth.
14	C♯	A♯	Commerce	Holland is built on commerce; Look ahead; Do not be narrow-minded or small; Be moderate: Investment comes before profits.
15	D	B	Industry	Industrious people, now liberated; Work, work always: Dutch effort make Holland strong.
16	D♯	C	Merchant marine	You who set your course between the stars and the waves, pray the Lord for protection and a favorable wind.
17	E	C♯	Finance industry	If you own money, it obeys and follows you. If money owns you: Obey it and it will swallow you.
18	F	D	Aviation industry	High bridge from nation to nation over seas, over clouds, The engines say it: Holland is prepared for new times.
19	F♯	D♯	Royal Netherlands Navy	From the days of Admiral De Ruyter to the present time: We still roam the seas as the lion the jungle.
20	G	E	Royal Netherlands Army	If possible hoist the flag in peace. If it has to be do your work well and resist bravely.
21	G♯	F	Royal Netherlands Air Force	Higher than eagles be your flight swift rulers of clouds and sky; Keep tyrants from our borders.
22	A	F♯	Civil servants	Army of peace: Civil servants; The ship of State will have a safe course as long as you support law and peace.
23	A♯	G	Women's organizations	You who are strong and independent and with understanding hearts: Free women, help us to build a better world in a new age.
24	B	G♯	Roosteren	Thou who hath liberated us and guided us miraculously through the battle in anxious times. praise be to Thee in eternity
25	C	A	Transportation industry	Time and distance vanish, mankind goes ever faster; But if this does not bring us peace it does not help us.
26	C♯	A♯	Middle class	Holland vanishes if the middle-class languishes. If it grows, then Holland blooms.
27	D	B	Trades	Never, apprentices, is labor disgraceful or petty. Watch the masters, follow their example.
28	D♯	C	Communication industry	Messenger of the gods with swift winged feet, may nations and peoples meet because of your flight.
29	E	C♯	Fishing industry	Lakes and seas are their hunting grounds, fish is their game, clouds and waves are their spacious domain.
30	F	D	Farming industry	They who resolutely sow the new seed. will reap a rich harvest, with the help of the Lord.
31	F♯	D♯	Horticulture	You who feed the cities, listen to my praising voice, Westland and Betuwe, gardens full of fruit.
32	G	E	Arts	The breath of God is in their work and shows us, how they create for us out of nothing.
33	G♯	F	Sciences	Torch, preserve your light; we pass you on; without you there is darkness; be our guide of light.
34	A	F♯	Education	Make us share in the truth, teach us earnestly to understand life.
35	A♯	G	Commercial arts	Beauty, adorn our life by your nearness, stay with us in everything.
36	B	G♯	Sport	The same purpose makes us a unity; It is the game which unites us.
37	C	A	Students	The future works with both head and hands for the common wealth of all free nations.
38	C♯	A♯	Youth	We twelve are jubilant in swift and joyful tones: the high voices of the youth of the Netherlands.
39	D	B	Youth	Out of nostalgia a name was born. We and Orange belong together. The fortieth bell. Suffer less than we do, do better than we did: bring peace!
40	D♯	C	Youth	(None)
41	E	C♯	Youth	Do like the bird of dawn: watch your time and your ground.
42	F	D	Youth	Do not remain in dream, flower and seed; You are the future, the deeds.
43	F♯	D♯	Youth	Posterity full of hope, spread your wings wide: The world is waiting.
44	G	E	Youth	A free people: a gay people. A working people: a strong people.
45	G♯	F	Youth	Both of these you will learn: to blossom, and to defend yourself.
46	A	F♯	Youth	Be like lambs in the pasture: playful, free and without cares.
47	A♯	G	Youth	Flower at the stream: enjoy your May; Your autumn will come later.
48	B	G♯	Youth	Graceful, agile and swift be your life and your play.
49	C	A	Youth	I am the smallest, the purest.

A fiftieth bell, cast by Royal Eijsbouts, was added following Dutch- and American-sponsored renovations in 1995, and dedicated on May 5, the 50th anniversary of the liberation of the Netherlands. It is two semitones higher in pitch than the lightest of the original 49 bells. The years "1945" and "1995" and the words "freedom" and "friendship" are inscribed on this bell.

The 2019–21 renovation increased the size of the carillon to 53 bells, all cast by Royal Eijsbouts, and converted the instrument to concert pitch. These three additional bells are dedicated jointly to "75 Years of Freedom" and individually to people who had a major impact on the Netherlands and the United States during and after World War II: 1) General George C. Marshall for his role in the Marshall Plan, from which the Netherlands received over $1 billion for post-war reconstruction efforts; 2) the Martin Luther King Jr., for his role as the voice of the American civil rights movement; and 3) Eleanor Roosevelt, for her role as an advocate for social justice and human rights.

"75 Years of Freedom" bells cast for the Netherlands Carillon in 2020
Namesake inscription	Pitch	Weight	Diameter	Additional inscriptions
General George C. Marshall	B♭0	7,595 lb (3,445 kg)	5 ft 9 in (1.75 m)	Classic Dutch imagery and coat of arms on upper rim; "75 Years of Freedom" logo
Martin Luther King Jr.	B♭4	37.5 lb (17.0 kg)	9.25 in (23.5 cm)	Dutch coat of arms, the year "2020"
Eleanor Roosevelt	C5	26.5 lb (12.0 kg)	8.25 in (21.0 cm)	Dutch coat of arms, the year "2020"

=== Tower ===
The carillon's bells hang dead in a tower approximately 127 feet (39 m) high, 36 feet (11 m) long, and 25 feet (7.6 m) wide. The original plans had called for the structure to be 270 feet (82 m) tall, but was then reduced after receiving concerns about its height in relationship to the Lincoln Memorial from the Commission of Fine Arts. The tower is an open steel structure reinforced by steel plates and a bronze baked-enamel finish. It was designed by renowned Dutch architect Joost W. C. Boks (1904–1986) and constructed in 1960. At the base of the tower, a rectangular staircase leads to an observation deck 60 feet (18 m) off the ground. From there, a spiral staircase winds further upward to a second observatory 83 feet (25 m) off the ground. The playing cabin sits in the center of the upper observation deck. At the base of the tower, a large inscription reads "From the People of the Netherlands to the People of the United States of America." The interconnecting lines and rectangles of the structure's frame echo the work of Dutch abstract painter Piet Mondrian. The tower's design also reflects the rejection of classical European architecture, which, in the years immediately following World War II, was associated with fascist regimes. The Netherlands Carillon is the first modernist steel memorial associated with the otherwise classical stone architecture found on the National Mall.

=== Grounds ===
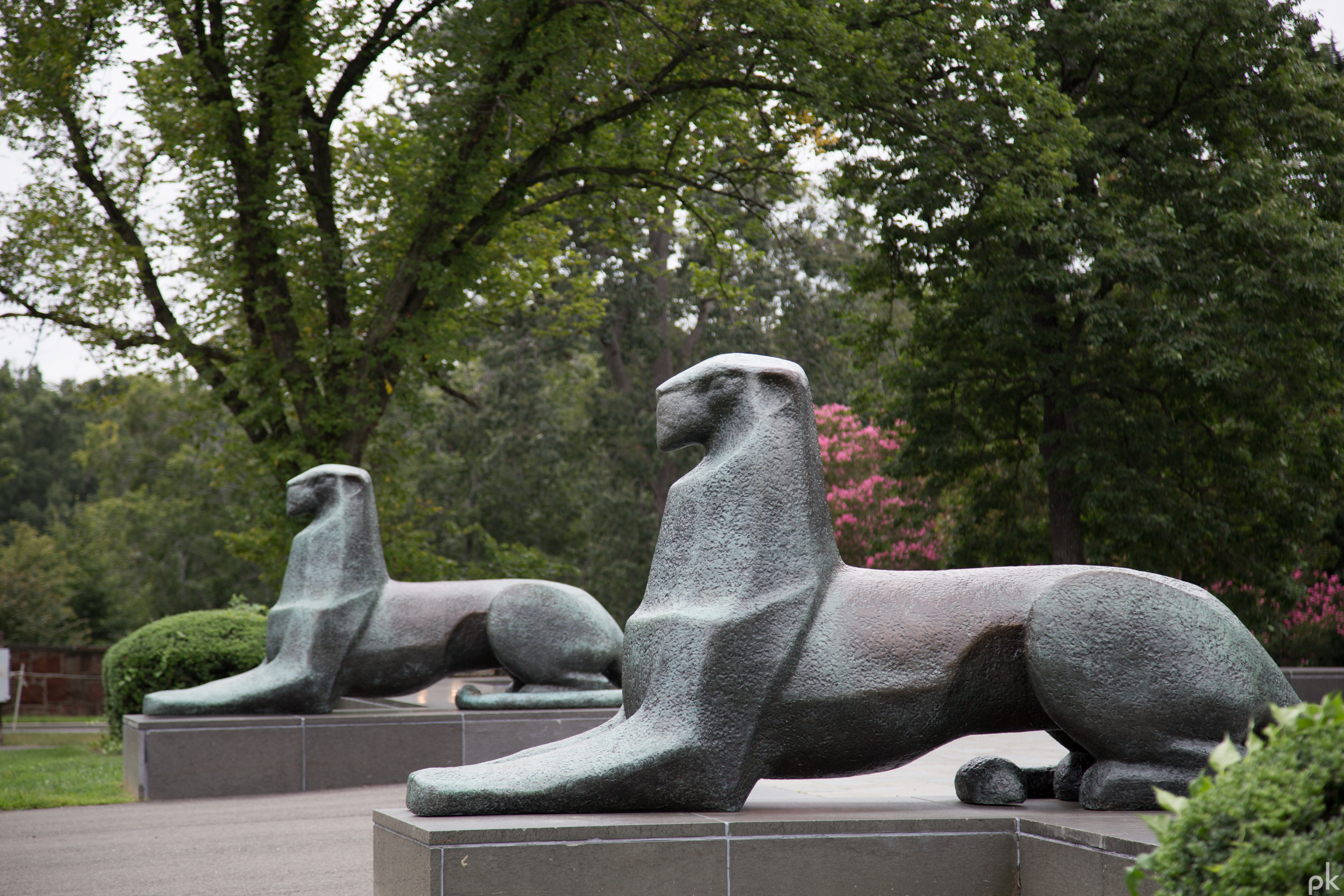
The Netherlands Carillon's bronze lions overlooking the garden of tulips.

The Netherlands Carillon stands on a 93 square feet (8.6 m^{2}) quartzite plaza and is enclosed by a low lava stone wall. Two bronze lions, which represent the Dutch royal family, guard the entrance to the plaza. They were designed by Dutch sculptor Paul Philip Koning. The Netherlands Carillon is located just north of Arlington National Cemetery and south of the Marine Corps War Memorial. It is administered by the National Park Service as part of the George Washington Memorial Parkway complex in Arlington Ridge Park.

A tulip library was planted in a circular bed immediately to the east of the plaza in 1964. As they are culturally and economically significant to the Netherlands, ten thousand tulips are planted in these gardens each year. In 1967 and 1972, First Lady Lady Bird Johnson's Beautification Program embellished the carillon grounds with new flower gardens in the shape of musical notes. These gardens are planted with tulips and other perennials and annuals. The program also planted the horseshoe of trees surrounding the backdrop of the campanile.

== Concerts ==
The Netherlands Carillon keeps time throughout the day by playing the Westminster Quarters on the hours and quarters. The carillon plays several automated concerts each day and on significant days in Dutch and American culture:

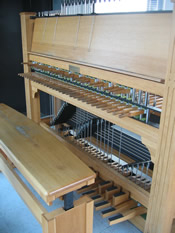
The keyboard through which the Netherlands Carillon can be played manually.

Recordings of performances on the Netherlands Carillon in August 2012
Twinkle, Twinkle, Little Star
Lisa Lonie plays "Twinkle, Twinkle, Little Star," as arranged by John Courter.

Ode to Joy
Lisa Lonie plays the Ode to Joy theme from Beethoven's Symphony No. 9, as arranged by Frank DellaPenna.

"Frolic" from Music for Twilight
Lisa Lonie plays "Frolic" from Frank DellaPenna's Music for Twilight.

- Mondays through Saturdays at noon and 6:00 PM
  - Medley of armed forces anthems
  - Stars and Stripes Forever
- Sundays at noon
  - Star-Spangled Banner
  - Wilhelmus (the Dutch national anthem)
  - Stars and Stripes Forever
- Sundays at 6:00 PM
  - Star-Spangled Banner
  - America the Beautiful
  - Eternal Father, Strong To Save (the Navy Hymn)
- May 5 (Dutch Liberation Day) at noon and 6:00 PM
  - Star-Spangled Banner
  - Wilhelmus (the Dutch national anthem)
- September 2 at 9:04 AM (The time at which the Japanese Instrument of Surrender was signed aboard the USS Missouri in 1945.)
  - Star-Spangled Banner
  - America the Beautiful
  - Eternal Father, Strong To Save
- Thanksgiving Day at noon and 6:00 PM
  - Simple Gifts
  - We Gather Together
- December 31 at 6:00 PM
  - Auld Lang Syne

During the months of June, July, and August, director-carillonist Edward Nassor organizes weekly concerts and recitals on Saturday afternoons. Carillonists from across the world are invited to play various styles of music each week. A schedule of concerts and visiting carillonists is published on the National Park Service's website in the months before the season begins.

== See also ==
- Netherlands–United States relations
- Other war memorial carillons
  - National War Memorial (New Zealand)
  - Netherlands Centennial Carillon
- List of carillons in the United States
