= St. Joseph Parkway =

- St. Joseph Park and Parkway System
- U.S. National Register of Historic Places
- U.S. Historic district
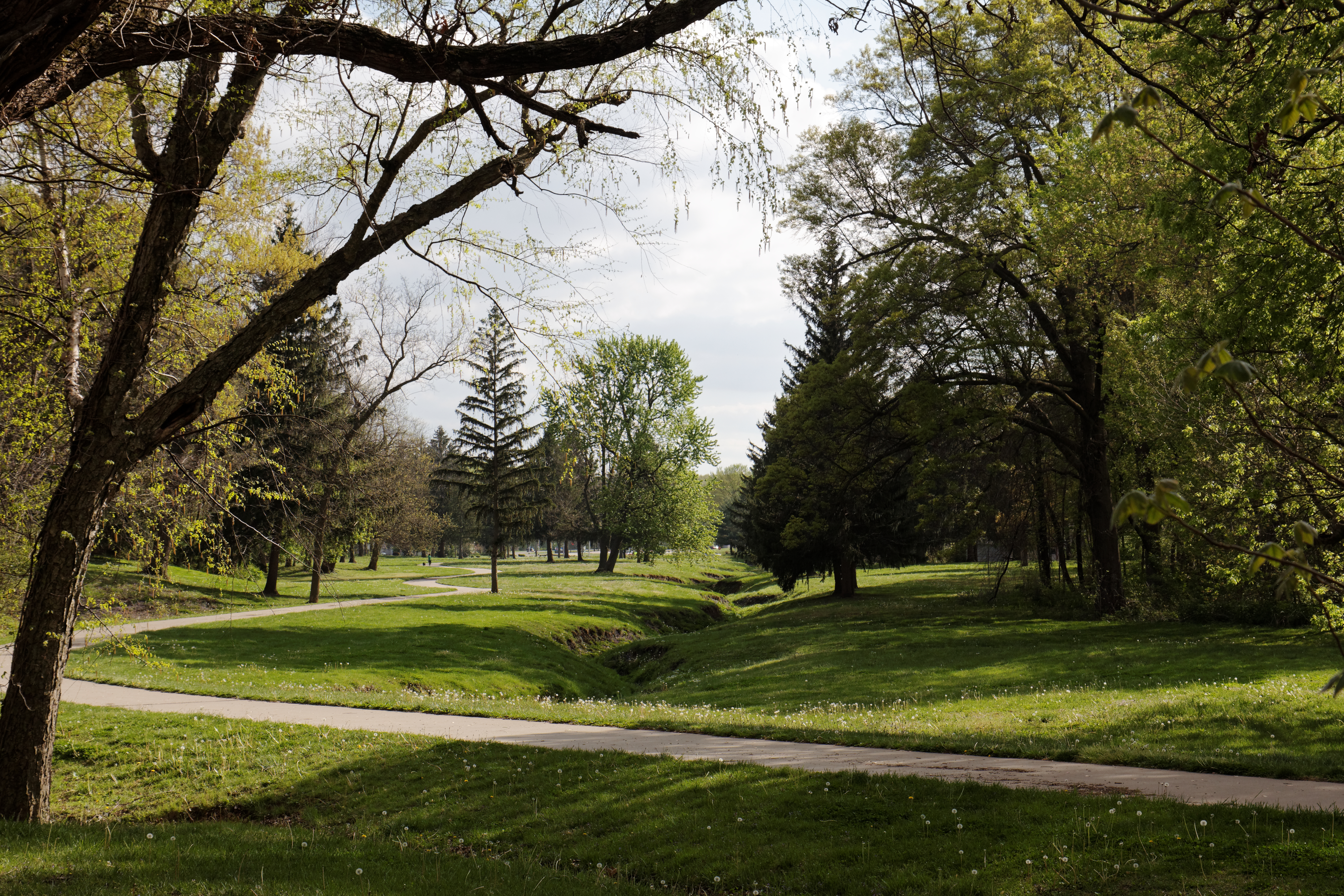
- St. Joseph parkway, April 2016

- Location within Missouri Location within the United States
- Location: Roughly, along Northwest, Northeast, Corby Grove, Southwest and A Pkwys. and Noyes Blvd. from Krug Park to Hyde Park, St. Joseph, Missouri
- Coordinates: 39°45′04″N 94°50′25″W
- Area: 983 acres (398 ha)
- Architect: Robinson, Charles Mulford; et al.
- Architectural style: Renaissance
- MPS: St. Joseph MPS
- NRHP reference No.: 94001566
- Added to NRHP: January 20, 1995

The St. Joseph Park and Parkway System is a national historic district located at St. Joseph, Missouri. It is St. Joseph, Missouri's hiking and biking Parkway ribbons through the city for 26 miles. Developed in 1918 by internationally known landscape architect George Burnap, St. Joseph was one of the first cities in the United States to develop a comprehensive parkway plan. Popular for hiking and biking activities, the completed system connects principal parks and recreation facilities, providing a "green belt" throughout the city.

St. Joseph's Parkway system was listed in the National Register of Historic Places in 1994.

== See also ==
- Krug Park
