= National Iwo Jima Memorial =

American war memorial in Connecticut

Coordinates: 41.69823°N 72.75852°W

The US National Iwo Jima Memorial is a monument by sculptor Joseph Petrovics, located on Ella Grasso Boulevard, near the New Britain/Newington town line in Connecticut. It was erected by the Iwo Jima Survivors Association, Inc. of Newington, Connecticut. It was dedicated on February 23, 1995, on the 50th anniversary of the flag raising on Iwo Jima. It is dedicated to the memory of the 6,821 US servicemen who gave their lives during the 1945 Battle of Iwo Jima. Inscribed on the base are the names of the 100 men from Connecticut who gave their lives in the battle.

The park also has an eternal flame and monuments dedicated to combat Medical Corps personnel and chaplains.

== See also ==
- Marine Corps War Memorial
