= Montrose Park =

- U.S. National Register of Historic Places
- U.S. National Historic Landmark District – Contributing property
- D.C. Inventory of Historic Sites
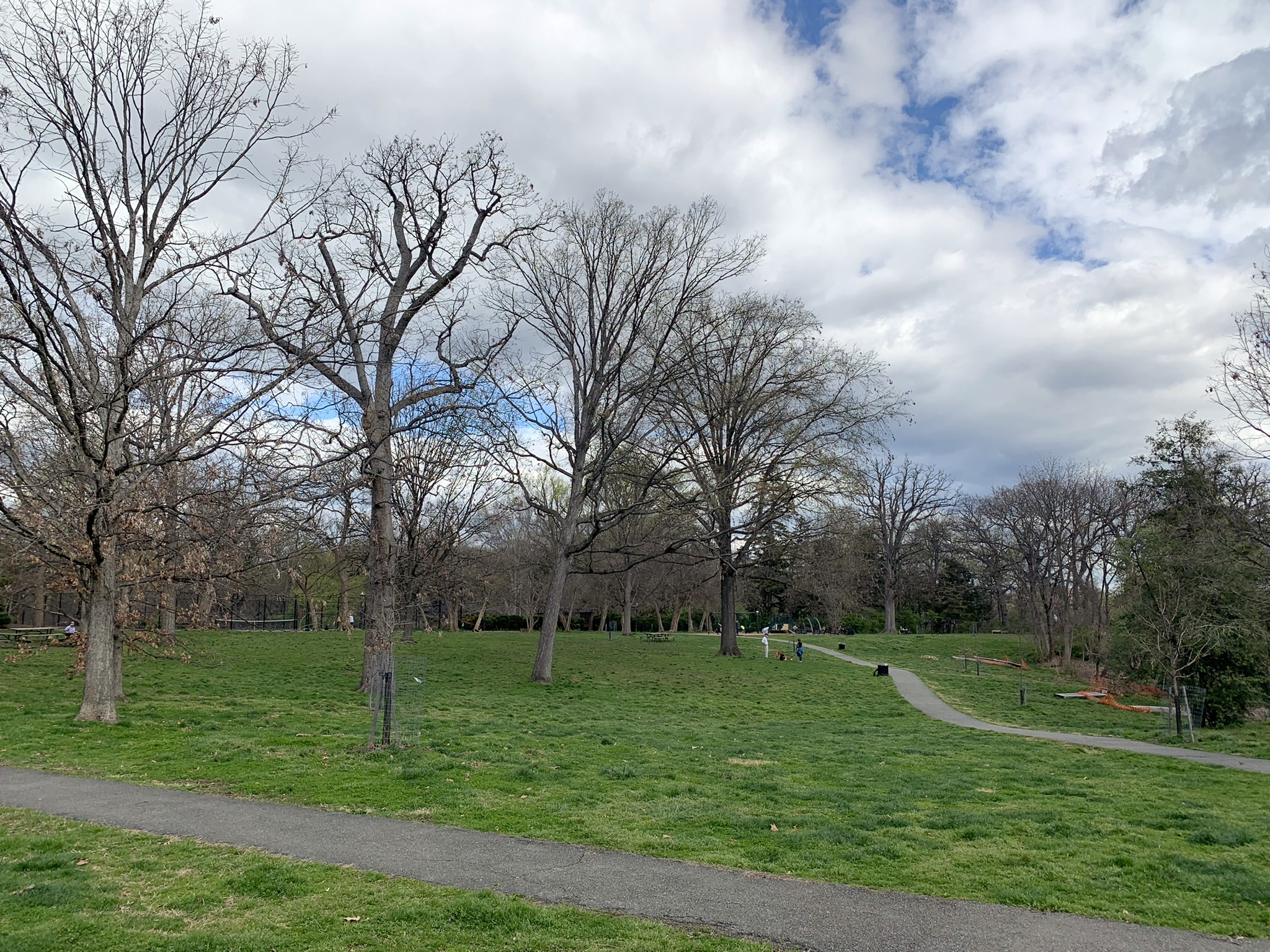
- Montrose Park in 2022

- Location within Washington, D.C.
- Location: R Street and Lovers' Lane, N.W., Washington, District of Columbia
- Coordinates: 38°54′51″N 77°03′38″W
- Built: 1911
- Part of: Georgetown Historic District (ID67000025)
- NRHP reference No.: 07001178

Significant dates
- Added to NRHP: November 15, 2007
- Designated DCIHS: March 3, 1979

Montrose Park is a public park owned by the federal government, located in the 3000 block of R Street, Northwest, Washington, D.C., in the Georgetown neighborhood. It is located between Dumbarton Oaks Park and Oak Hill Cemetery. Both Montrose Park and Dumbarton Oaks Park were jointly listed on the National Register of Historic Places on May 28, 1967. Montrose Park obtained an individual listing in 2007.

In addition to a large children's play area in the back of the park, there are two sets of tennis courts, as well as open space with footwalks and trails that lead into Rock Creek Park.

== History ==
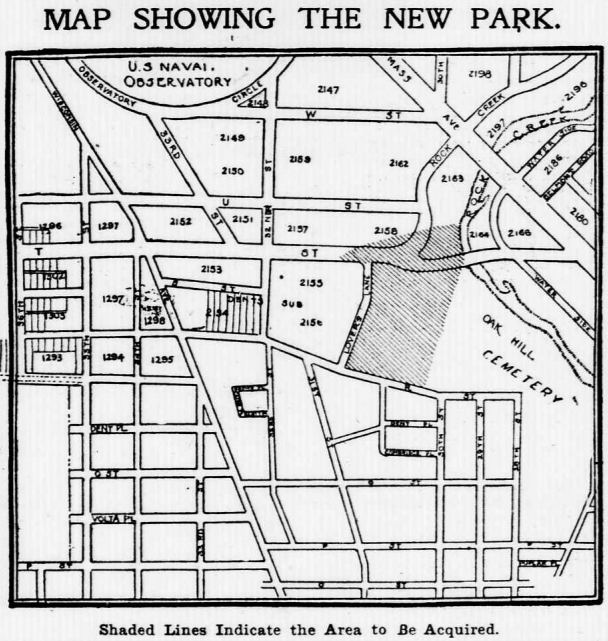
A map of Georgetown Heights prior to the creation of Dumbarton Oaks Park, Dumbarton Oaks Gardens and Montrose Park, showing the proposed location of Montrose Park.

The property was early owned by ropemaker Robert Parrott, who allowed the community to use it as a picnic ground. Sarah Louisa Rittenhouse successfully led a group to lobby Congress to acquire the property as an addition to Rock Creek Park. The park was established in 1911 "after a hard-fought battle" in Congress. To honor Rittenhouse's efforts to make the Parrott property a park rather than a housing development, an "armillary sphere" was created in her honor through fundraising efforts by Washington, DC, hostesses.

In 1914, the federal Office of Public Buildings and Grounds hired George Burnap and Horace Peaslee to develop plans for Montrose Park to keep its ambience that of a large country estate, including a network of paths, an entrance ellipse, a pergola, and a lodge. When that office was abolished in 1933, the National Park Service took over managing the park. Ten years later, a Cultural Landscape Report was published as the preferred treatment document for the park. A service group, the Friends of Montrose Park, assists the Park Service in maintaining and restoring the park as outlined in that report. The park retains a 500 ft (0.15 km)-long ropewalk that was used from 1804 to 1814.

== See also ==
- Rock Creek Park
