= Tracy Memorial Village Hall Complex =

Historic place in New York, United States

- U.S. National Register of Historic Places
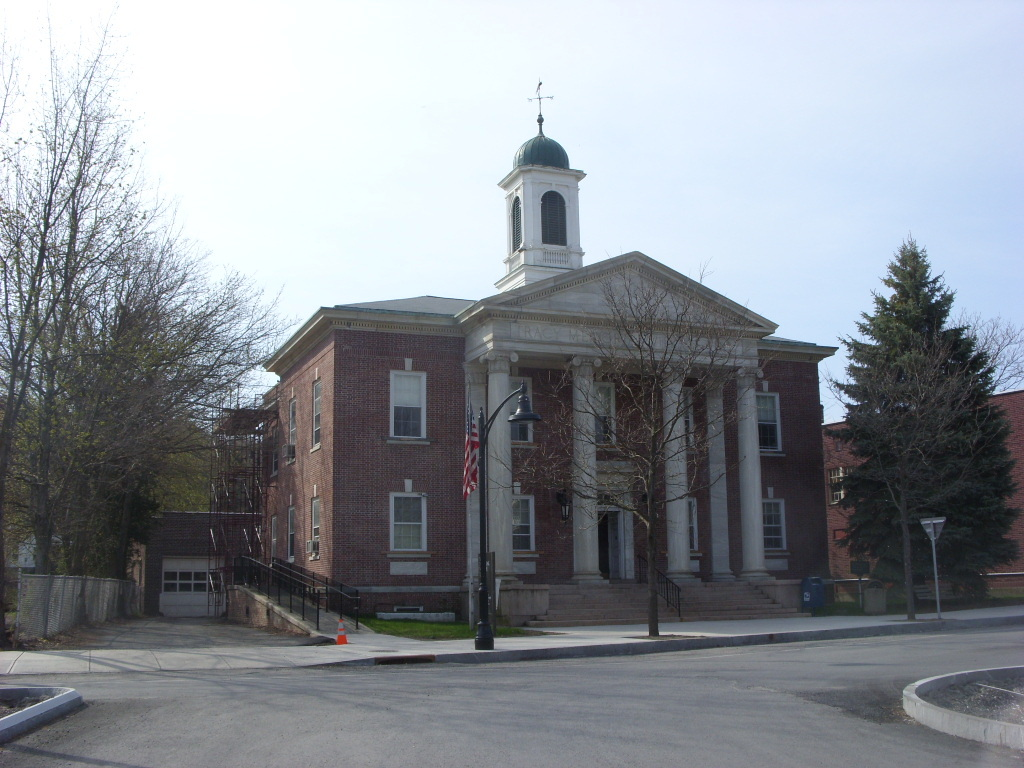
- Tracy Memorial Village Hall Complex, April 2009

- Location within New York Location within the United States
- Location: 516 Church Ave., Chatham, New York
- Coordinates: 42°21′49″N 73°35′50″W
- Area: 0.61 acres (0.25 ha)
- Built: 1912-1913, 1914, 1925
- Built by: Torrington Building Company; Kline & Crosby
- Architect: Horace Peaslee; George Burnap
- Architectural style: Classical Revival, Colonial Revival
- NRHP reference No.: 15000953
- Added to NRHP: January 5, 2016

Tracy Memorial Village Hall Complex is a historic village hall located at Chatham, Columbia County, New York. It was built in 1912–1913, and is a two-story, rectangular brick building in a Classical Revival / Colonial Revival style. It is topped by a hipped roof with cupola. The front facade features a monumental Ionic order portico of grey marble. Also on the property is the contributing firehouse (1925) and the H.F. Jenks Company Cup Fountain (1914) located in the Central Square.

It was added to the National Register of Historic Places in 2016.
