= Marine Corps War Memorial =

National war memorial in Arlington, Virginia, U.S.

- United States of America
- Marine Corps War Memorial
- For the Marine dead of all wars, and their comrades of other services who fell fighting beside them.
- Unveiled: November 10, 1954; 72 years ago
- Location: 38°53′25.6″N 77°04′11.0″W near Washington, D.C.; U.S
- Designed by: Felix de Weldon (sculptor); Horace Peaslee (architect)
- Uncommon Valor Was A Common Virtue; In Honor And Memory Of The Men Of The United States Marine Corps Who Have Given Their Lives To Their Country Since 10 November 1775

The United States Marine Corps War Memorial (Iwo Jima Memorial) is a national memorial located in Arlington Ridge Park in Arlington County, Virginia. The memorial was dedicated in 1954 to all Marines who have given their lives in defense of the United States since 1775. It is located in Arlington Ridge Park within the George Washington Memorial Parkway, near the Ord-Weitzel Gate to Arlington National Cemetery and the Netherlands Carillon. The memorial was turned over to the National Park Service in 1955.

The war memorial was inspired by the iconic 1945 photograph of six Marines raising a U.S. flag atop Mount Suribachi during the Battle of Iwo Jima in World War II taken by Associated Press combat photographer Joe Rosenthal. Upon first seeing the photograph, sculptor Felix de Weldon created a maquette for a sculpture based on the photo in a single weekend at Patuxent River Naval Air Station in Maryland, where he was serving in the Navy. He and architect Horace Peaslee designed the memorial. Their proposal was presented to Congress, but funding was not possible during the war. In 1947, a federal foundation was established to raise funds for the memorial.

== History ==
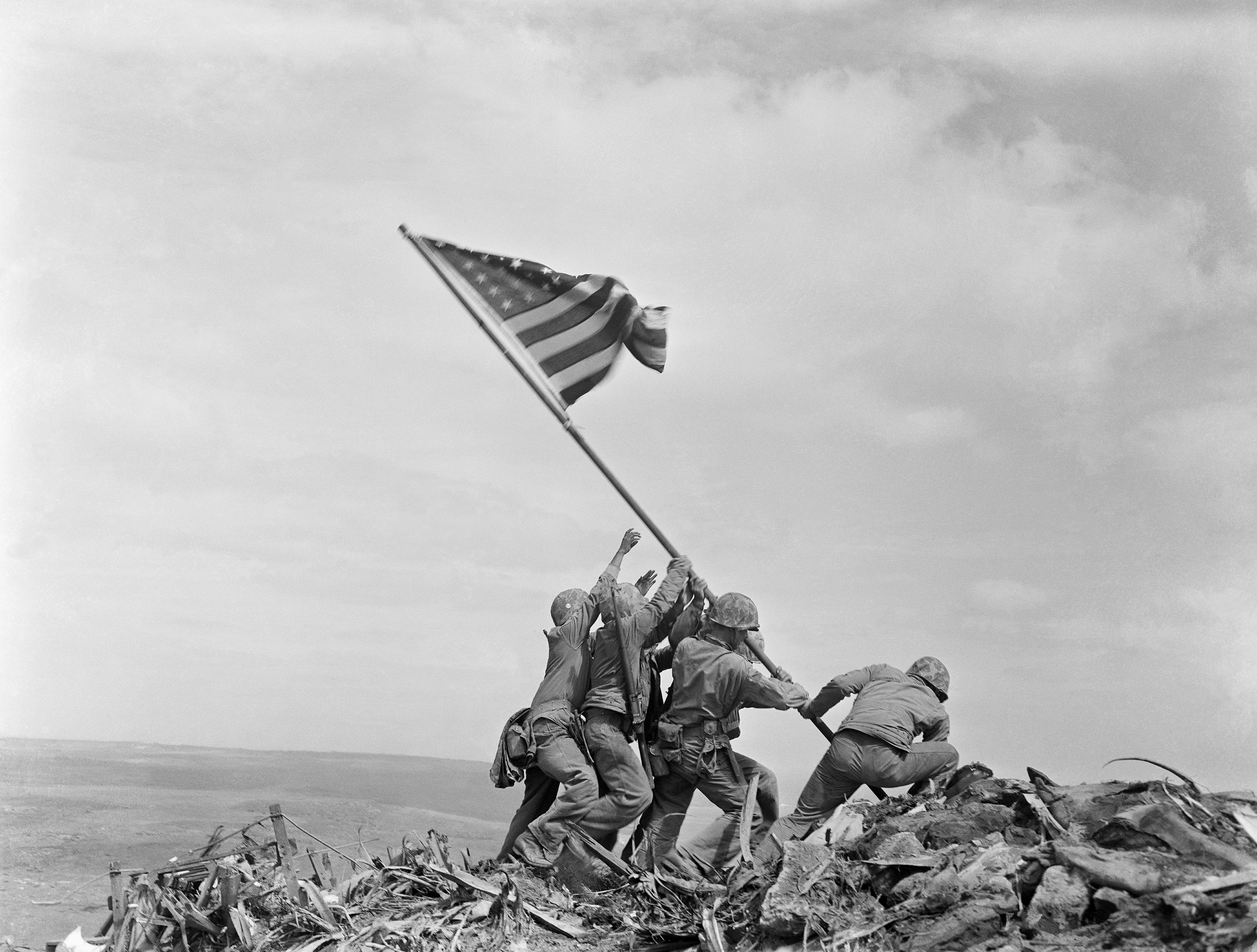
The original 1945 photograph

A portion of the color film shot of the second flag-raising on Mount Suribachi by Sgt. Bill Genaust, USMC, excerpted from the 1945 film To the Shores of Iwo Jima

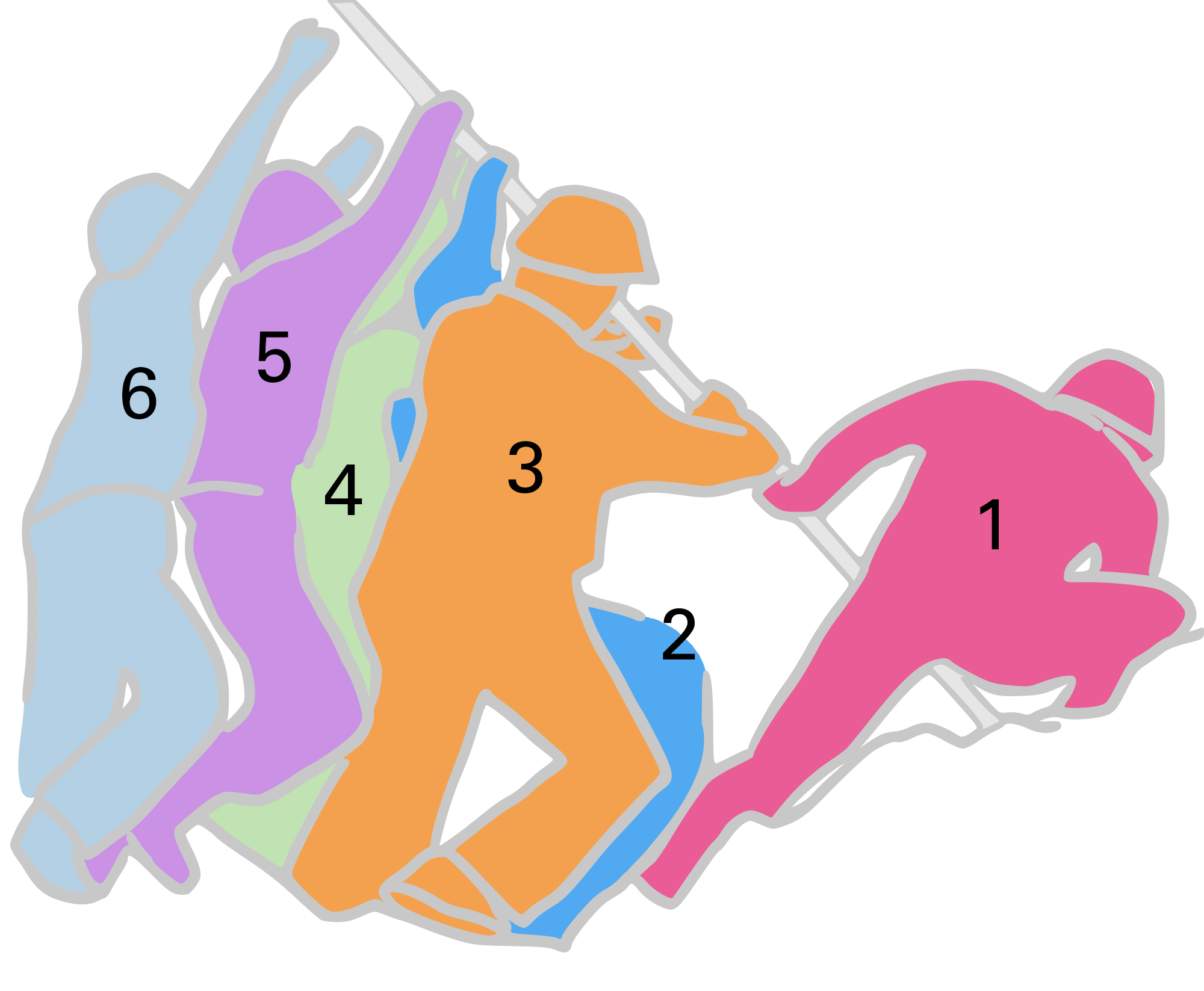
The six Marine flag-raisers depicted on the memorial: #1, Cpl. Harlon Block (KIA) #2, Pfc. Harold Keller #3, Pfc. Franklin Sousley (KIA) #4, Sgt. Michael Strank (KIA) #5, Pfc. Harold Schultz #6, Pfc. Ira Hayes

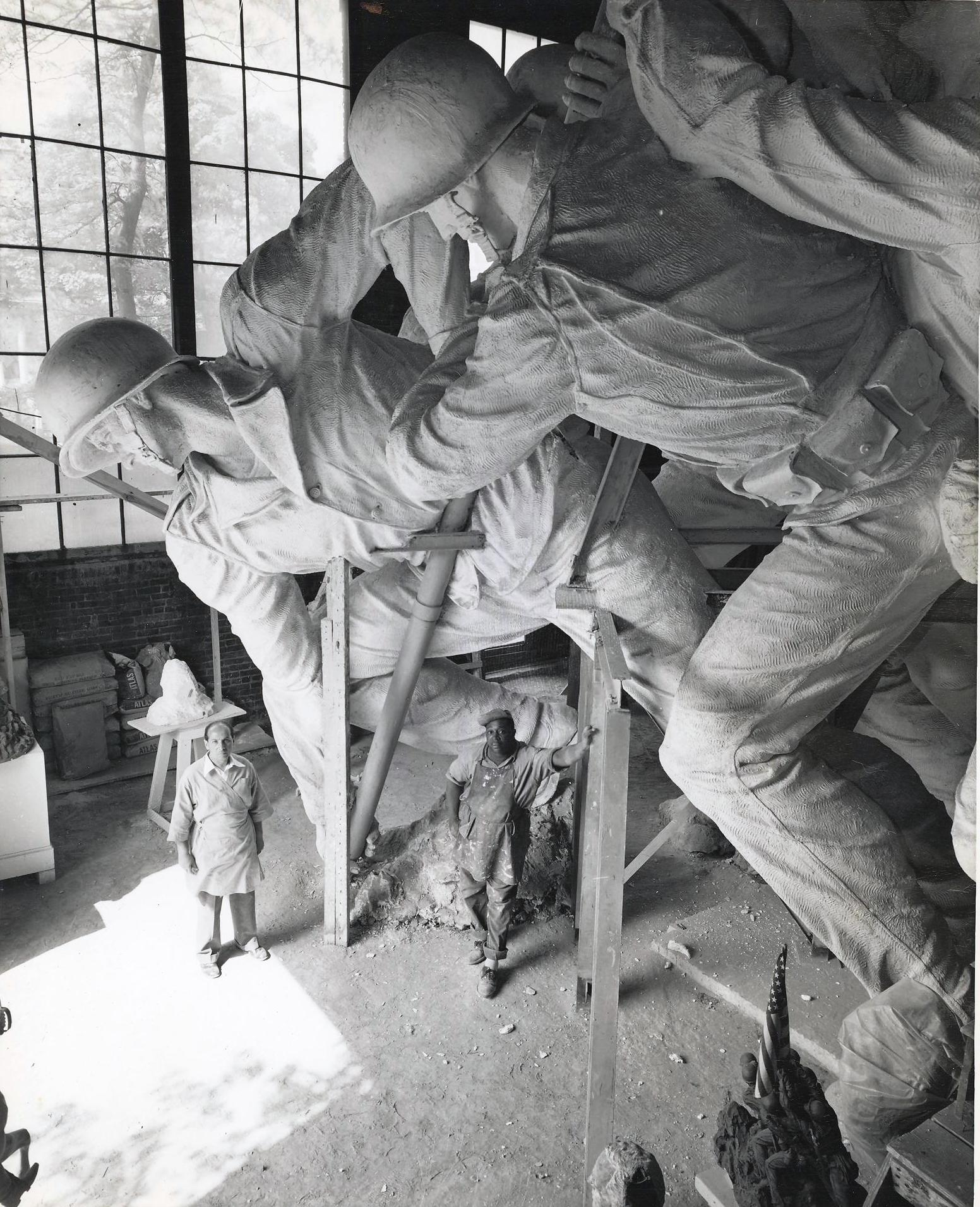
Felix de Weldon (left) puts the finishing touches on the full-size plaster model in his studio in Washington, D.C. The model was cut into 108 pieces, which were then sand-cast in bronze and welded at Bedi-Rassy Art Foundry in Brooklyn—a process that took nearly 3.5 years.

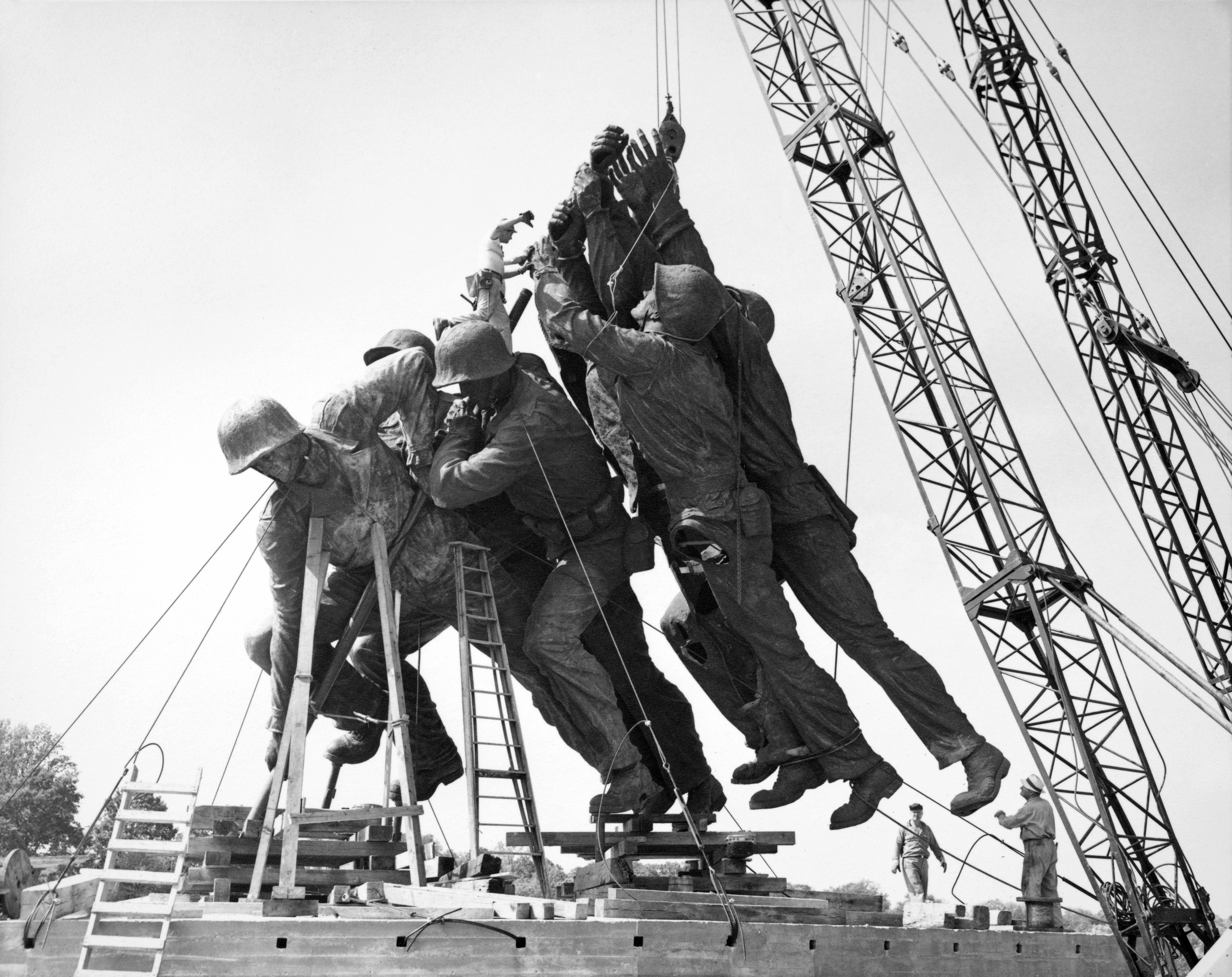
Installation of the memorial began in September 1954.

The centerpiece of the memorial is a colossal sculpture group depicting the six Marines who raised the second and largest of two U.S. flags that were both raised atop Mount Suribachi located at the south end of Iwo Jima, on February 23, 1945. The first flag flown over the mountain was regarded to be too small to be seen by all the American troops on the other side of it where most of the fighting would take place, so it was replaced by a larger flag.

The flag-raising also was recorded by Marine Sergeant Bill Genaust, a combat motion picture cameraman. He filmed the event in color while standing beside Rosenthal. Genaust's footage established that the second flag raising was not staged. On March 4, 1945, he was killed by the Japanese after entering a cave on Iwo Jima and his remains have never been found. The subjects of Rosenthal's photograph (identification changes were made in 1947, 2016, and 2019), from right to left, are as follows:

- Position 1: Corporal Harlon H. Block
- Position 2: Corporal Harold P. Keller
- Position 3: Private First Class Franklin R. Sousley
- Position 4: Sergeant Michael Strank
- Position 5: Private First Class Harold H. Schultz
- Position 6: Private First Class Ira H. Hayes

The Memorial was approved by the United States Congress and commission for the memorial was awarded in 1951, after it was approved and accepted by the Marine Corps League who also selected De Weldon as the sculptor. De Weldon spent three years creating a full-sized master model in plaster, with figures 32 feet (9.8 m) tall. This was disassembled like a giant puzzle, and each piece was separately cast in bronze. Peaslee's base for the memorial is made of black diabase granite from a quarry in Lönsboda, a small town in the southernmost province of Sweden. It features a number of inscriptions. The Groundbreaking ceremony was held on February 19, 1954, exactly nine years after the Marines landed on Iwo Jima. General Lemuel Shepherd, 20th Commandant of the Marine Corps, did the groundbreaking. Construction of the memorial began in September. The bronze pieces of the sculpture were assembled to Brooklyn, New York for casting in bronze. This took about 3 months to complete. After that, they were reassembled into a dozen pieces and were shipped back to Arlington, Virginia in a 3 truck convoy, to which was added a 60 feet (18 m) flagpole. The total cost of the memorial was $850,000, including the development of the site. It was paid for with donations mostly from active duty Marines and Marine Reservists. Other donors included former Marines and friends of the Marine Corps and members of the Naval Service; no public funds were used.

The memorial was dedicated on Wednesday, November 10, 1954, the 179th anniversary of the founding of the Marine Corps. The presiding officials included President Dwight D. Eisenhower, Vice President Richard Nixon, Secretary of Defense Charles E. Wilson, Deputy Secretary of Defense Robert Anderson, Assistant Secretary of the Interior Orme Lewis, and General Lemuel C. Shepherd. Besides the words and prayers said by three military chaplains, remarks during the dedication were given by Robert Anderson, Chairman of the Day, Colonel J.W. Moreau, U.S. Marine Corps (Retired), President, Marine Corps War Memorial Foundation, Orme Lewis, and General Lemuel Shepherd who presented the monument to the people of the United States. Following that, a U.S. flag was raised up the Memorial's flagpole. Felix de Weldon also spoke, and Richard Nixon gave the dedicatory address. The dedication ceremony ended with the playing of taps. The Memorial was under the stewardship of the Marine Corps Memorial Foundation until the monument was dedicated.

President John F. Kennedy issued a proclamation on June 12, 1961, that a Flag of the United States should fly over the memorial 24 hours a day, which is one of the few official sites where this is required. Despite being mounted on the staff of the sculpture, which depicts an event that occurred when the U.S. flag had 48 stars, the flag used is a modern one (specifically, one featuring the number and arrangement of stars prescribed as of when the flag is being flown) in keeping with both the text of the proclamation and the memorial's dedication to all Marines who died in defense of the United States regardless of when their deaths occurred.

The memorial is located on a high ridge, overlooking the national capital. The Marine Barracks, Washington, D.C. uses the memorial as the centerpiece of its weekly Sunset Parade, featuring the Drum and Bugle Corps and the Silent Drill Platoon.

== Memorial marker and inscriptions ==
The memorial consists of front and rear inscriptions, and inscribed in gold letters around the polished black granite upper base of the memorial is the date and location of every United States Marine Corps major action up to the present time.

Front (west side): "Uncommon Valor Was a Common Virtue" – "Semper Fidelis"

Rear (east side): "In Honor and Memory of the Men of The United States Marine Corps Who Have Given Their Lives to Their Country Since 10 November 1775"

The "uncommon valor" remark was made by Fleet Admiral Chester W. Nimitz, USN on 17 March 1945. A fuller version of his comment is "The battle of Iwo Island has been won. The United States Marines, by their individual and collective courage, have conquered a base which is as necessary to us in our continuing forward movement toward final victory as it was vital to the enemy in staving off ultimate defeat.... Among the Americans who served on Iwo Island, uncommon valor was a common virtue."

Felix de Weldon's and Joe Rosenthal's names are also inscribed on the bottom left and bottom right base of the front side of the memorial. Rosenthal's name was added in 1982.

=== Marker ===
"Dedicated to the Marine Dead of All Wars, and Their Comrades of Other Services Who Fell Fighting Beside Them.

Created By Felix De Weldon, And Inspired By The Immortal Photograph Taken By Joseph J. Rosenthal On February 23, 1945, Atop Mt. Suribachi, Iwo Jima, Volcano Islands.

Erected By The Marine Corps War Memorial Foundation, With Funds Provided By Marines and Their Friends, and with the Cooperation and Support of Many Public Officials.

Dedicated, November 10, 1954"

=== Major action inscriptions ===
- Revolutionary War 1775–1783
- French Naval War 1798–1801
- Tripoli 1801–1805
- War of 1812 1812–1815
- Florida Indian Wars 1835–1842
- Mexico 1846–1848
- War Between the States 1861–1865
- Spanish War 1898
- Philippine Insurrection 1898–1902
- Boxer Rebellion 1900
- Nicaragua 1912
- Vera Cruz 1914
- Haiti 1915–1934
- Santo Domingo 1916–1924
- World War I 1917–1918
  - Belleau Wood
  - Soissons
  - St. Mihiel
  - Blanc Mont
  - Meuse-Argonne
- Nicaragua 1926–1933
- World War II 1941–1945
  - 1941;
  - Pearl Harbor
  - Wake Island
  - Bataan & Corregidor
  - 1942;
  - Midway
  - Guadalcanal
  - 1943;
  - New Georgia
  - Bougainville
  - Tarawa
  - New Britain
  - 1944;
  - Marshall Islands
  - Marianas Islands
  - Peleliu
  - 1945;
  - Iwo Jima
  - Okinawa
- Korea 1950
- Lebanon 1958
- Vietnam 1962–1975
- Dominican Republic 1965
- Lebanon 1981–1984
- Grenada 1983
- Persian Gulf 1987–1991
- Panama 1988–1990
- Somalia 1992–1994
- Afghanistan 2001–2021
- Iraq 2003–

== Memorial rumor and criticism ==
A persistent rumor has attributed the existence of a thirteenth hand from the six statues of the men depicted on the memorial, and speculation about the possible reasons for it. When informed of the rumor, de Weldon exclaimed, "Thirteen hands. Who needed thirteen hands? Twelve were enough."

In discussing the site for the United States Air Force Memorial, originally to be near de Weldon's work, J. Carter Brown, chairman of the United States Commission of Fine Arts in 1998, described the Marine Corps Memorial as kitsch. "It was taken from a photograph, it is by a sculptor, even though he was a member of this commission at one point, who is not going to go down as a Michelangelo in history—and yet it is very effective, largely because of its site," he said. Brown's remark was met with calls for his resignation from the commission, and disagreement over his categorization from the commission's staff.

== Refurbishment ==
On April 29, 2015, philanthropist David Rubenstein pledged over five million dollars to refurbish the memorial in honor of his father, a Marine veteran from World War II who died in 2013, "and all Marines who have died in service to the United States." The $5.37 million donation, made through the National Park Foundation, supported cleaning and waxing the statue, polishing the black granite panels, regilding inscriptions, relandscaping, and making repairs to the pavement, lighting and flagpole. While the Park Service performs regular routine maintenance, this was the first comprehensive refurbishment of the memorial since its dedication in 1954. The work was done in three phases with completion in 2018.

== Related memorials ==
=== Prototype ===
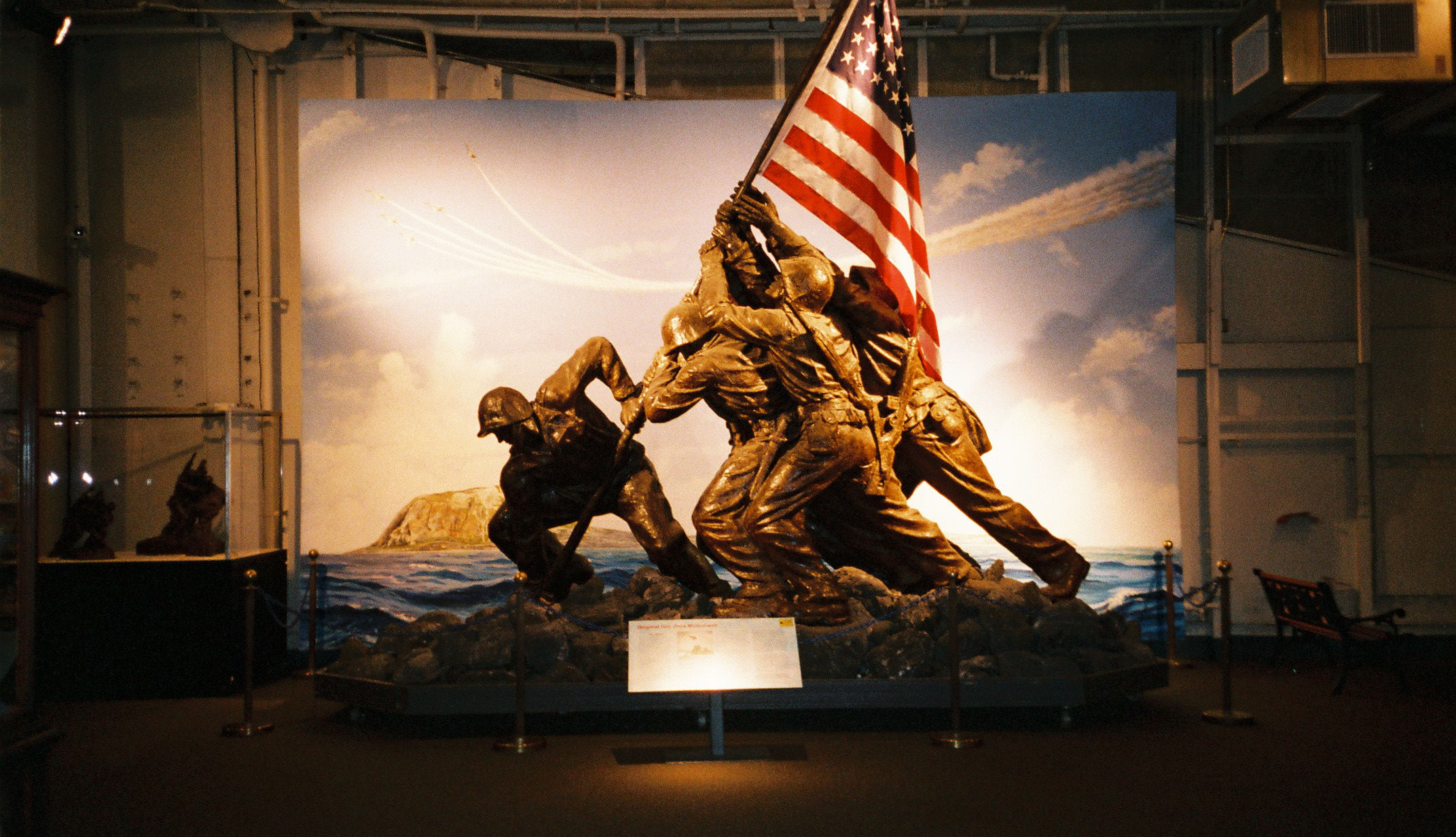
The Original Iwo Jima Monument is a 1945 cast-stone prototype of the Marine Corps War Memorial that was last exhibited at the Intrepid Sea, Air & Space Museum 1995–2007.

When there were no government funds for sculpture during the war, de Weldon self-financed a cast stone version of similar design in a one-third size that was placed on a parcel of land in Washington, D.C. until 1947, when it was put into storage. It later was restored and displayed at a museum on an aircraft carrier and again, returned to storage. This small concrete statue of the second U.S. flag raising at Iwo Jima in 1945 was scheduled to be auctioned in February 2013 at a New York auction dedicated to World War II artifacts, but it failed to receive the minimum bid required for the auction of it to begin.

=== Replicas and related memorials ===
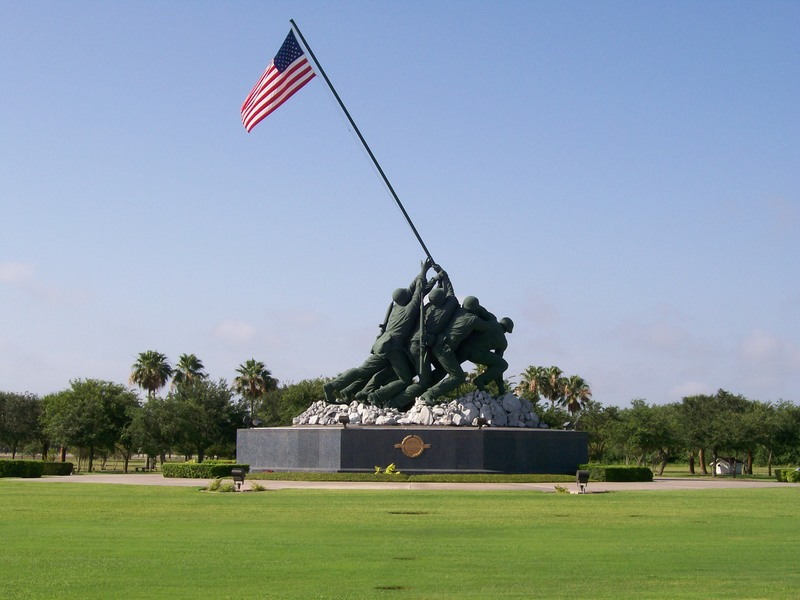
In 1981, de Weldon gave the full-size plaster model used to cast the Marine Corps War Memorial in bronze to the Marine Military Academy, a private preparatory school in Texas. The sculptor supervised the reassembly of the monument, which was dedicated on the academy parade grounds on April 16, 1982.

- The original plaster working model used to cast the Marine Corps War Memorial currently stands in Harlingen, Texas, at the Marine Military Academy, a private Marine Corps-inspired youth military academy. The academy is the final resting place of Corporal Harlon Block, one of the flag raisers who was killed in action on Iwo Jima.
- A small model stands in the lobby of Spruance Hall, U.S. Naval War College, Newport, Rhode Island. It was presented by Felix de Weldon, a resident of Newport.
- There are scaled-down replicas at three Marine bases:
  - At Marine Corps Base Quantico in Virginia just outside the front gate.
  - At Marine Corps Base Hawaii in Kāne'ohe Bay.
  - At Marine Corps Recruit Depot Parris Island in South Carolina on the Peatross Parade Deck, where the replica is steel that is one-third scale and also sculpted by Weldon. For the final act of The Crucible, the Marines' 54-hour final training test, Marine recruits at Parris Island hike 9 miles to the statue as the sun rises and the flag is raised. They then are addressed on the flag raising and its meaning and are then awarded their Eagle, Globe and Anchor emblems by their drill instructors signifying them as full-fledged Marines.
- A similar (though not identical) statue was erected located at Cape Coral, Florida, in 1964
- On 18 May 1973, a bronze relief of the memorial was placed along Cedar Point Road near St. Nicholas's Chapel at the Patuxent River Naval Air Station in Maryland.
- A version of the memorial dedicated in commemoration of the 50th anniversary of World War II stands in the Knoebels Amusement Resort in Elysburg, Pennsylvania.
- A similar design is used for the National Iwo Jima Memorial in Newington, Connecticut, which was dedicated in 1995 to the 6,821 U.S. servicemen who died in the battle.
- A replica was installed at Bicentennial Park in Fall River, Massachusetts, along the banks of the Taunton River, in 2005.
- The tilted spire above the National Museum of the Marine Corps is a visual allusion to the original sculpture.
- A plywood cutout version is found along Highway 62 ca. 17 miles (27 km) from the center of Twentynine Palms, California.
- Iwo Jima Sculpture and Memorial Wall at Foster Park in Young Harris, Georgia

== See also ==
- List of national memorials of the United States
- Iron Mike
- National Museum of the Marine Corps
- United States Navy Memorial
