= Krug Park (St. Joseph, Missouri) =

City park in Missouri, U.S.

Coordinates: 39.80°N 94.85°W

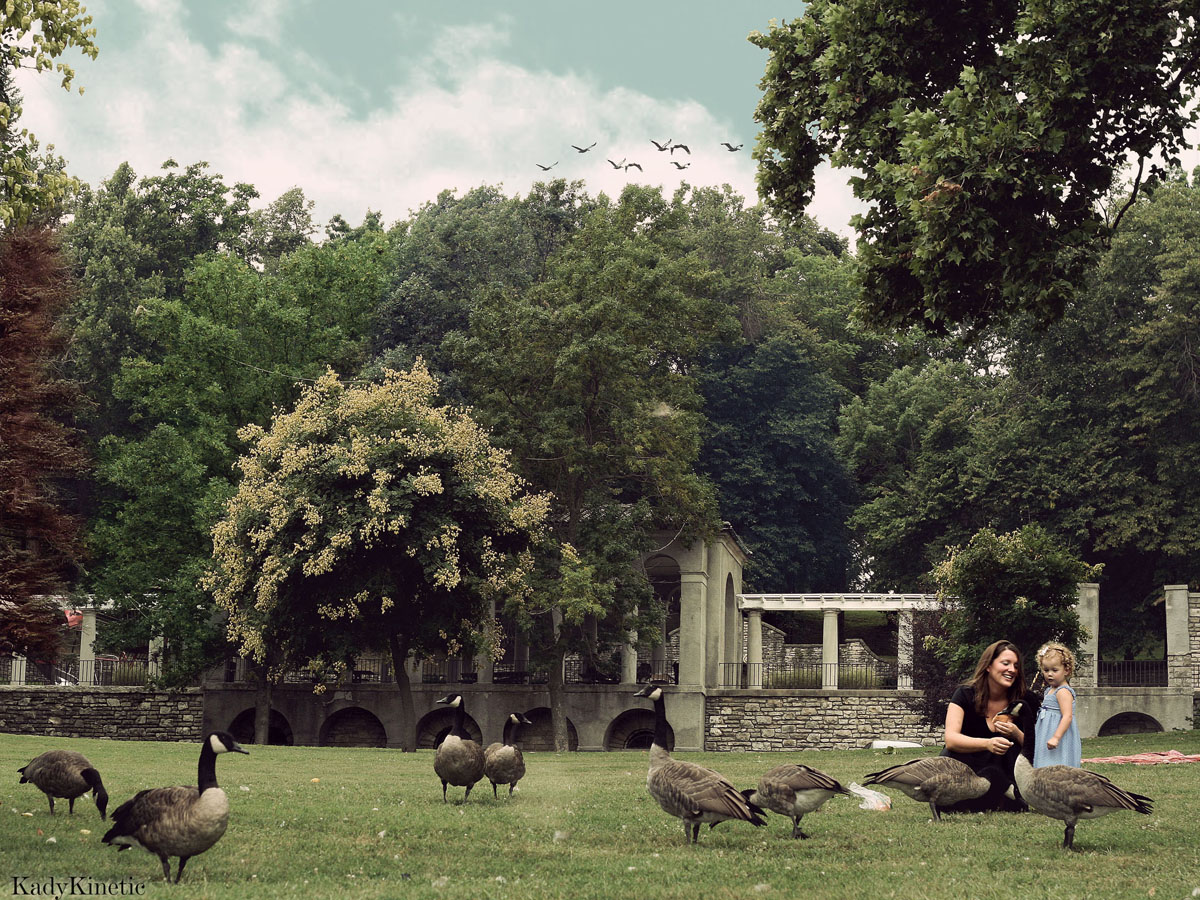
Geese at Krug Park

Krug Park, located at the northern end of the Parkway St. Joseph in Saint Joseph, Missouri, is a large city park with Italian Renaissance structures, extensive landscaping and flowerbeds. The park's 163 acres (0.66 km^{2}) house an amphitheater, a lagoon, rose gardens, picnic areas, an Italian castle, scenic walking trails, and various playgrounds. Krug Park "lights up" during the holiday season as Holiday Park.

== History ==
The park is often referred to as St. Joseph's oldest park. While other areas were given for public use earlier, it is true that Krug Park was the first public outing area under the jurisdiction of the board of park commissioners which received public expenditure. As such, it was developed before any other parks. On February 26, 1890, Henry Krug, donated 10 acres (40,000 m^{2}) to the City for use exclusively as a park, on the conditions "that no intoxicating liquors shall ever be kept, sold or disposed of in or upon said premises...nor shall any gambling or gambling devices be permitted." The City was to keep the park in good condition, under police control, and expend annually at least $2,000.00 under the direction of the park commissioners.

Early plans of Krug Park are not available, but from narrative sources it appears that the City quickly spent in excess of the required $2,000.00 per year. As St. Joseph's only developed public space, Krug Park became the "catch-all" for everything that the public seemed to desire. Park Superintendent Rudolph G. Rau seemed particularly fond of flower displays and formally designed beds, and Krug Park boasted many such spectacular displays. It also had at one time a zoo, greenhouses, botanical gardens, gazebos, the Robidoux cabin, a fountain, and a lily pond.

Krug Park was officially open to the public on May 6, 1902. The impressive stone gateway was just nearing completion at that time. The conservatory, which had been constructed at least since 1900, was a very popular spot for park visitors during this period. Alligators were kept in the pond in front of conservatory, and several other exotic animals were housed around the park. Old war cannons were moved to the park, and (as a result of a hoax) so was the so-called "Robidoux cabin." A reporter in need of a story saw an old cabin being torn down, and claimed that it belonged to the town's founder, Joseph Robidoux. As a result, the cabin was moved to Krug Park and maintained for many years.

== Notable Homicides ==
Throughout its history, there have been three notable homicides on park grounds.

In July 1913, 19-year-old Madeline Rowbotham was murdered at the entrance of Krug Park. Her ex-boyfriend, Thomas Harris, slit her throat with a razor. After cutting her throat, the razor broke as he attempted to slash his own throat, and he was restrained. Harris was convicted of murder and served 29 years of a life sentence. He was paroled in 1942 and died in St. Joseph in 1954.

On January 26th, 1940, the frozen bodies of Alfred L. Dick and his fiancée Jane Miller were found inside a car parked at the top of the hill. The medical examination and police inquest determined that Alfred had shot Jane multiple times before shooting himself.

On October 16th, 2016, 17-year-old Kaytlin Root was stabbed to death by Sebastian Dowell and an accomplice, Amanda Bennett, on the walking trail west of the hilltop. Interrogation revealed that the murder was a part of a Satanic ritual motivated by the suspect's interest in occultism. Both Dowell and Bennett were found guilty of first-degree murder in 2017 and sentenced to life in prison with the possibility of parole in 2042.
