= Arlington Ridge Park =

- U.S. National Register of Historic Places
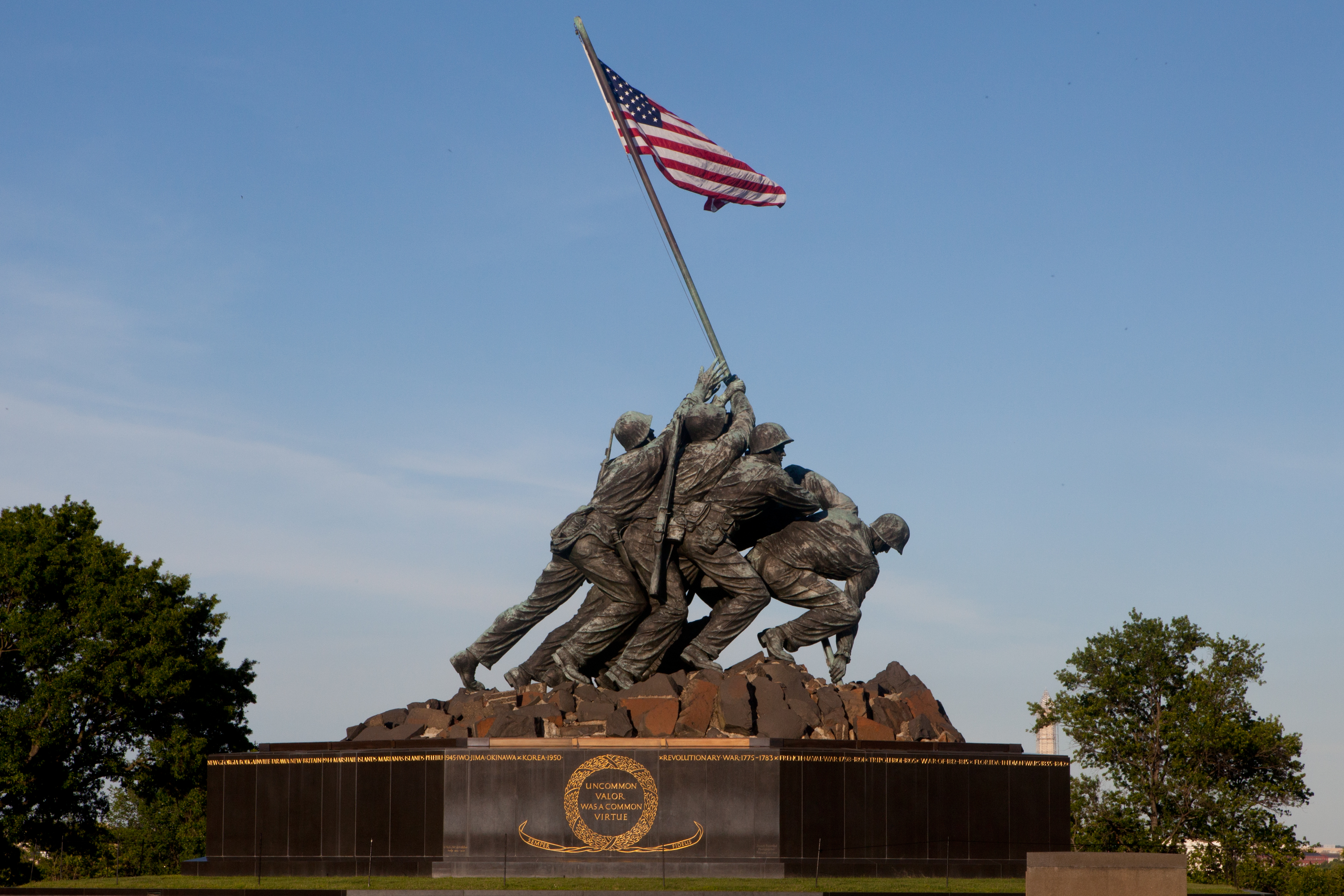
- Marine Corps War Memorial

- Location within District of Columbia Location within Virginia Location within the United States
- Location: NW corner of N. Meade St. and Marshall Dr., Arlington County, Virginia, U.S.
- Coordinates: 38°53′15″N 77°4′18″W
- Area: 27.5 acres (11.1 ha)
- Built: 1953-1954, 1960
- Architect: Neild, Edward F.; et al.
- MPS: Parkways of the National Capital Region MPS
- NRHP reference No.: 09000688
- Added to NRHP: September 4, 2009

Arlington Ridge Park, also known as the Nevius Tract, is a historic park property located in Arlington County, Virginia. The property lies within the boundaries of the George Washington Memorial Parkway. It includes the Marine Corps War Memorial (1954), also known as the Iwo Jima Memorial; and the Netherlands Carillon (1960).

It was listed on the National Register of Historic Places in 2009.
