= Colony Hill =

Neighborhood in Washington, D.C., U.S.

- Neighborhood of Washington, D.C.
- Map of Washington, D.C., with Colony Hill highlighted in red
- Coordinates: 38.913384°N 77.084539°W
- Country: United States
- District: Washington, D.C.
- Ward: Ward 3

Government
  - Councilmember: Matthew Frumin
- Postal code: ZIP code

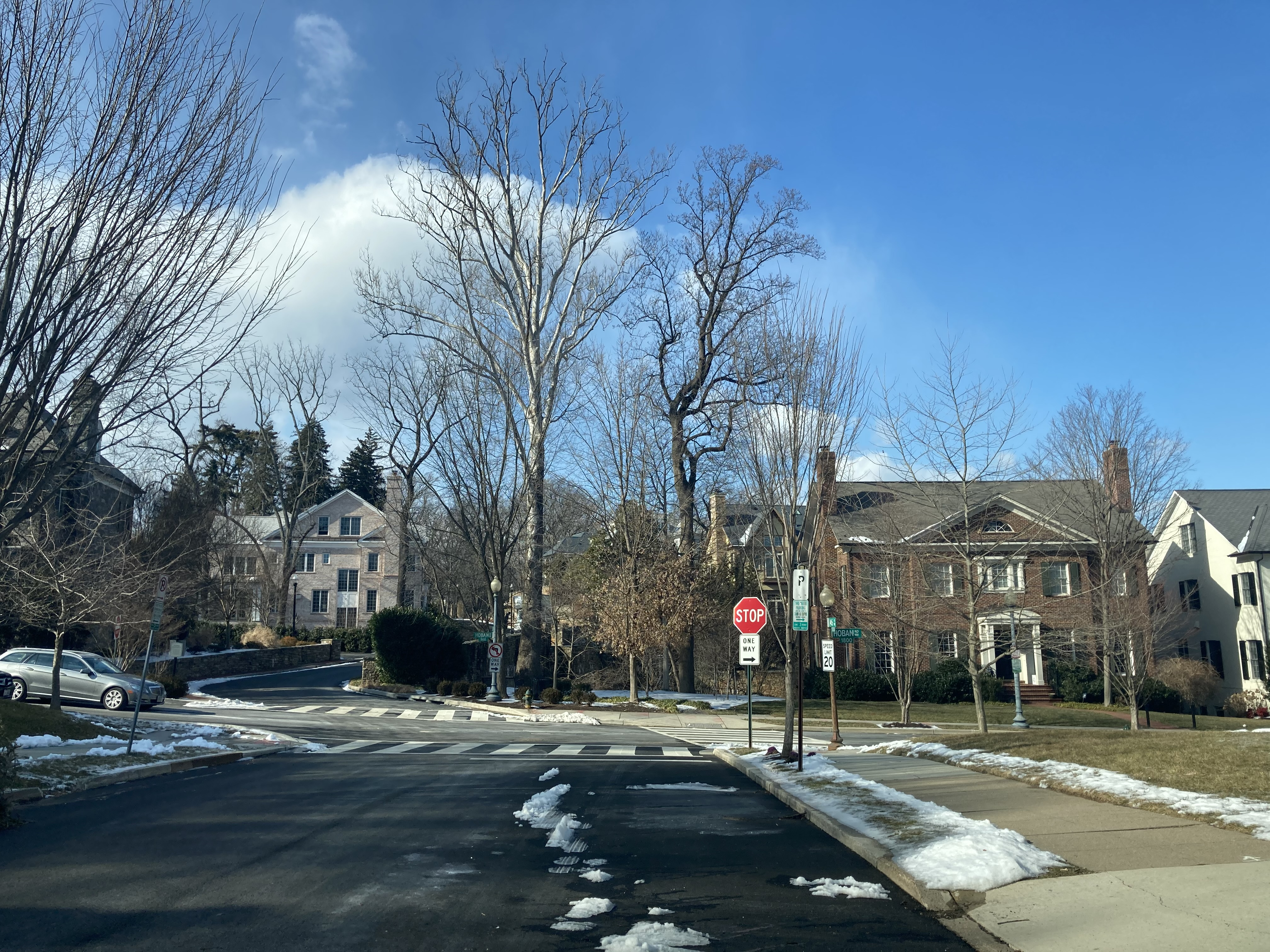
Intersection of 45th St. and Hoban Rd. NW, February 2021

Colony Hill is a small neighborhood located in the southwest corner of Glover Archbold Park in Northwest Washington, D.C. It is bounded on the north and east by the park, on the south by Reservoir Road NW, and on the west by Foxhall Road NW. Colony Hill falls within Ward 3.

Developed in the 1930s, Colony Hill has been a designated historic district since 2021.

Colony Hill is purely residential, and consists of only three streets: Foxhall Road, Hoban Road NW, 45th Street NW, and Hadfield Lane NW, which are bordered by Glover Archbold Park, Reservoir Road and Foxhall Road. It belongs within the 20007 zip code.
