= Edward Hamlin Everett House =

1915 Beaux-Arts mansion

Coordinates: 38°54′42″N 77°03′03″W

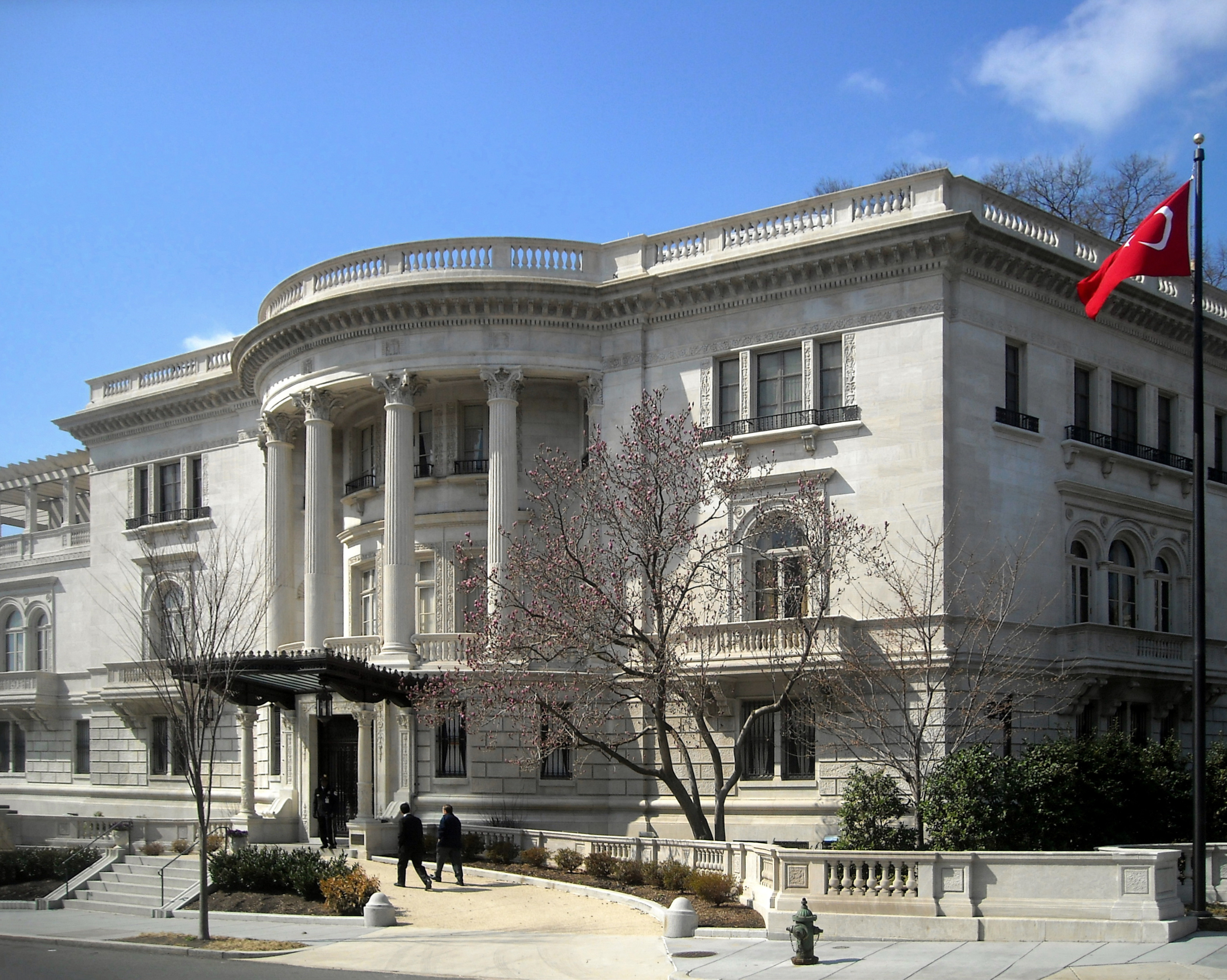
The Edward H. Everett House in 2009

Edward Hamlin Everett House, is a 1915 Beaux-Arts mansion located, just off Sheridan Circle, at 1606 23rd St., NW in Washington, D.C. that today is the Residence of the Ambassador of Turkey.

== History ==
View from dining room toward conservatory, c. 2005

The building, Beaux-Arts in style, was built between 1910 and 1915 for Edward Hamlin Everett, a bottling millionaire. Everett's company, The American Bottle Company, merged with Corning to eventually become Owens Corning. Prior to the 1929 stock market crash, his estimated wealth was between $40–50 million. Everett also owned Château de l'Aile in Vevey, Switzerland and The Orchards, his summer residence in Bennington, Vermont that was also designed by Totten and later became Southern Vermont College.

The house was designed by George Oakley Totten Jr., a graduate of the École des Beaux-Arts in Paris who was one of Washington D.C.'s most prolific and skilled architects in the Gilded Age. The house was built as the winter residence for Everett who sought to enter society in the nation's capital.

"As one moves past the Neoclassical façade, rooms jump from Baroque to Ottoman to Renaissance to Art Nouveau styles, studiously maintaining their individual integrity against each other."

After Everett's death, his widow, Grace Burnap, approached the Turkish government and offered to rent out the mansion to them. Totten, the architect of the house, had spent a brief period in Turkey as the official architect for Ottoman Sultan Abdul Hamid II. The Turkish ambassador, Munir Ertegun, moved in with his family in 1934. Several years later, they bought the mansion, fully furnished with Everett's antiques, including Sèvres porcelain and Gobelin wall tapestries.

In 2007, the house was fully restored after three years and $20 million renovation by Washington restoration architect Belinda Reeder and embassy interior designer Anikó Gaal Schott.

=== 2017 Attacks ===
Erdoğan just before the clash. Video from Voice of America.

On May 16, 2017, dozens of peaceful protestors were assaulted by Turkish security officials. Turkish President Recep Tayyip Erdoğan, visiting the Ambassador's residence that sits on Sheridan Circle, watched the clashes from a distance.

== Gallery ==
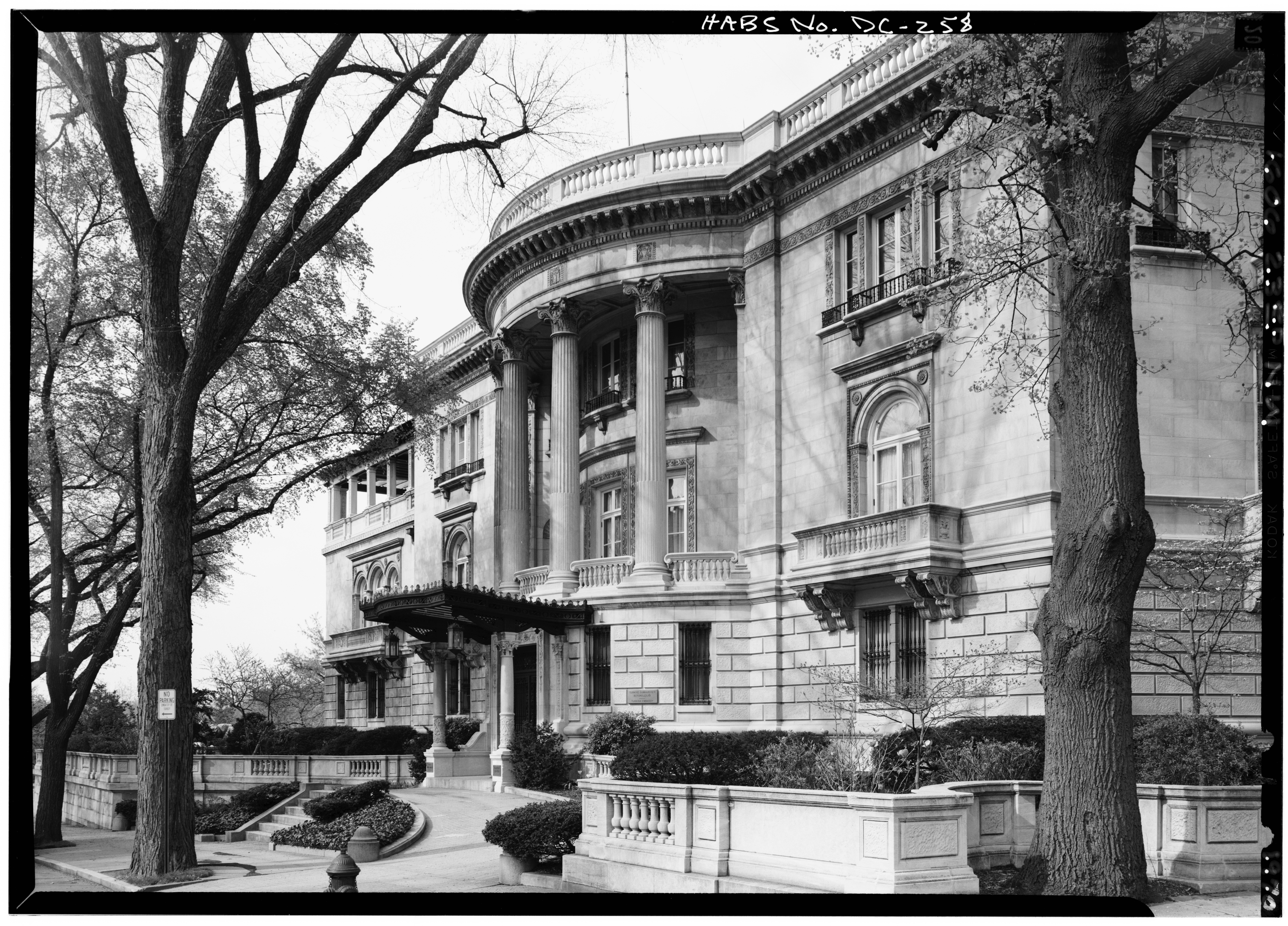
View of house from Sheridan Circle, 1970

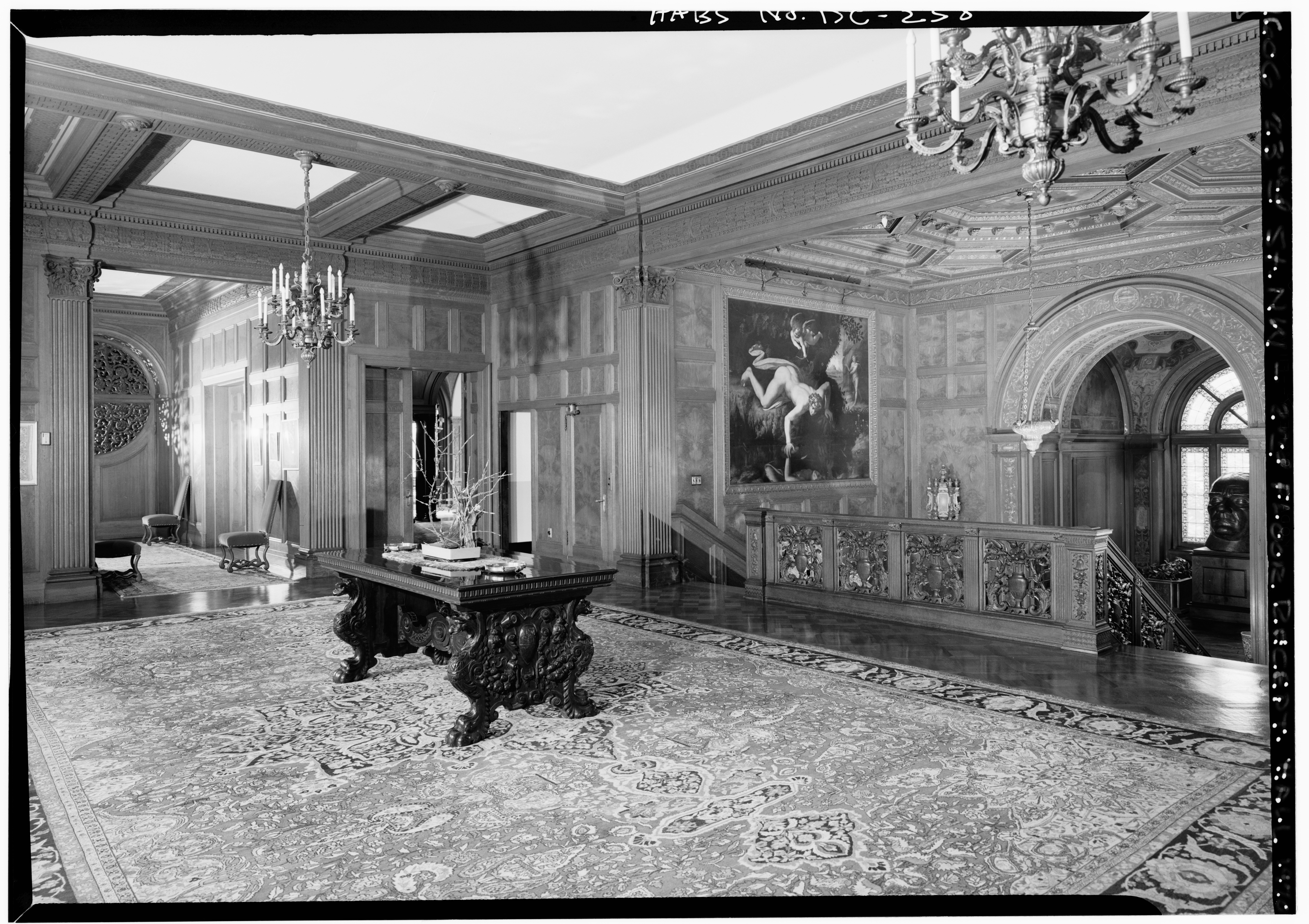
Second floor reception hall, 1970

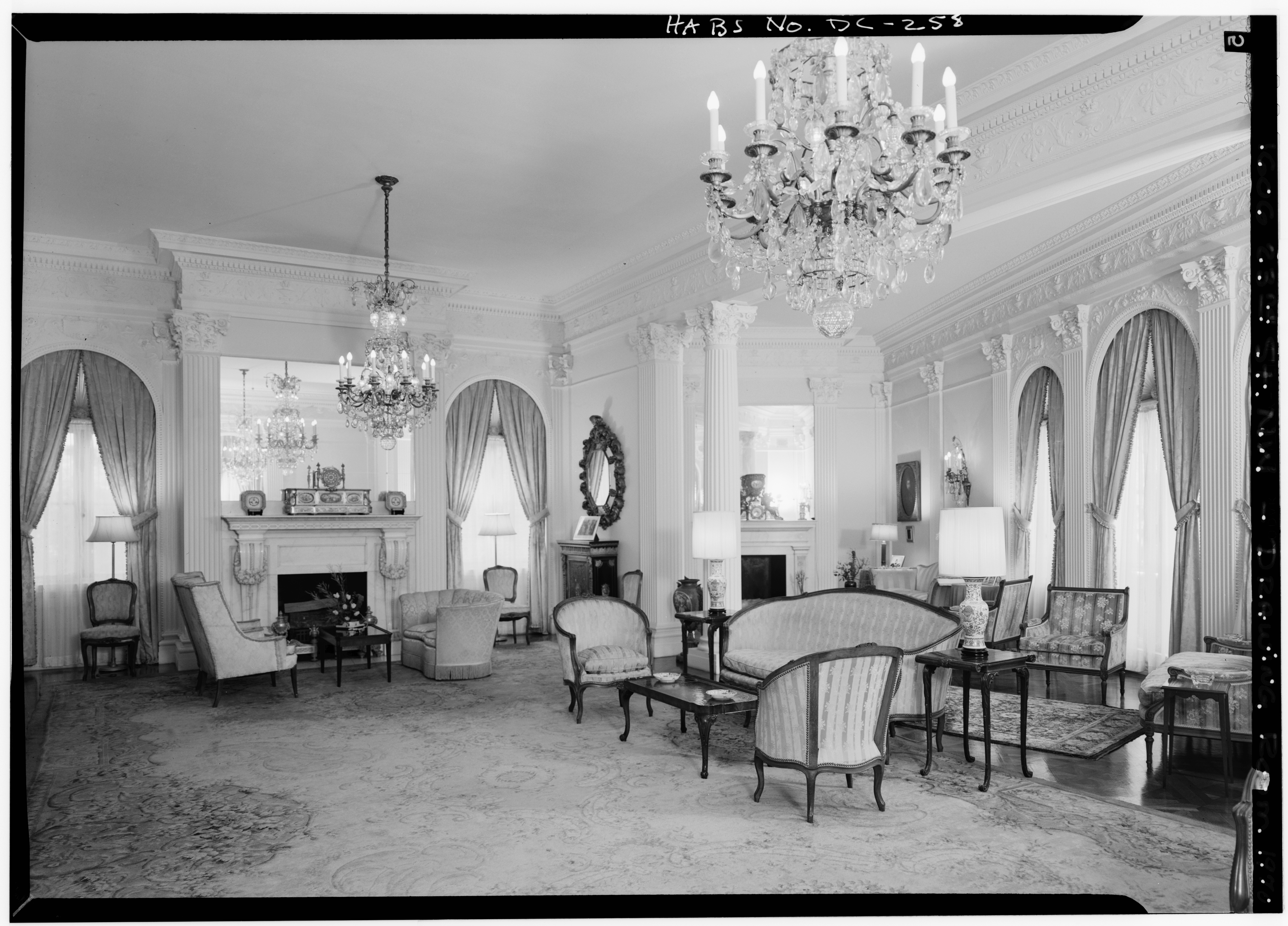
Second floor drawing room, 1970

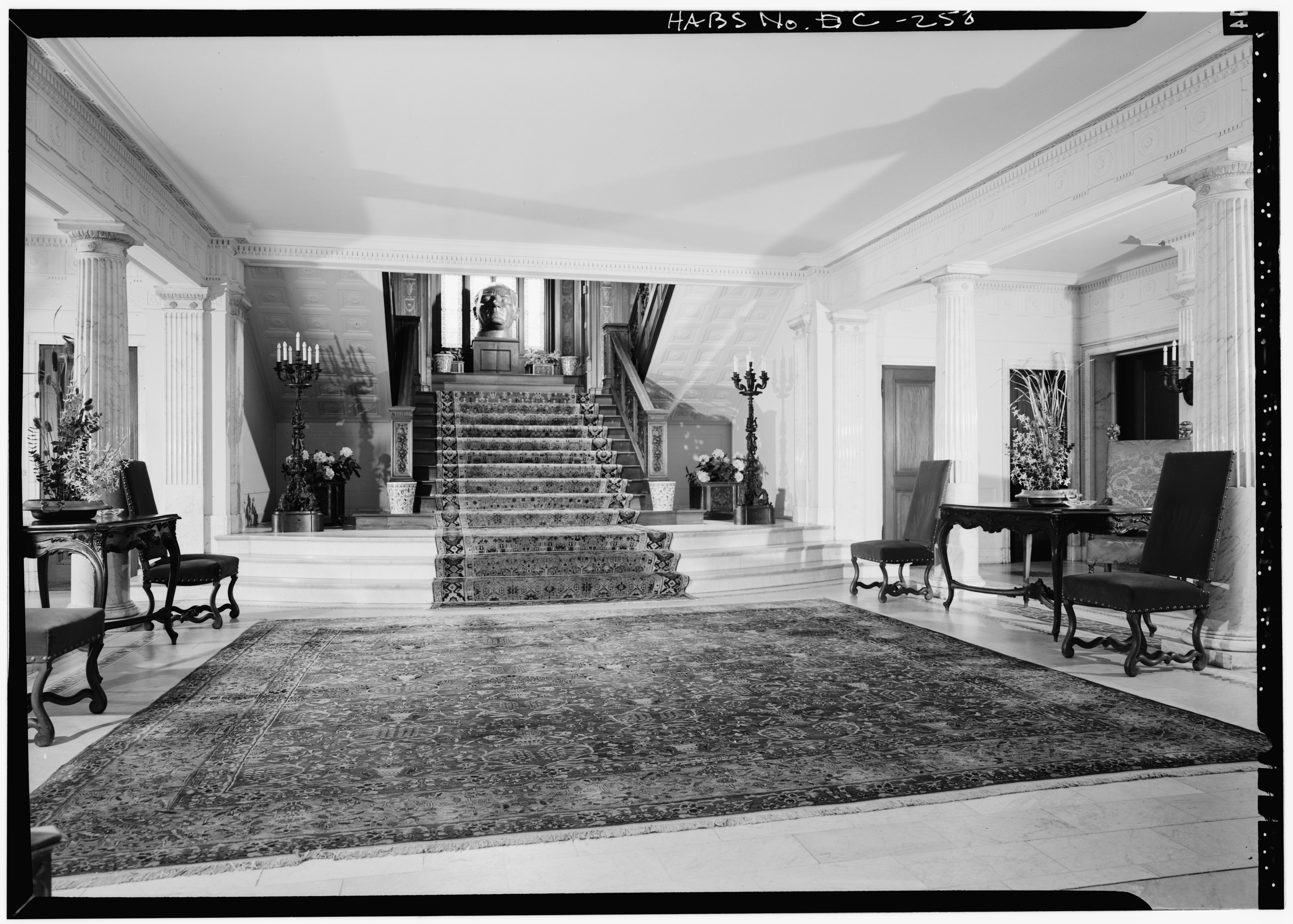
Ground floor entrance hall, 1970

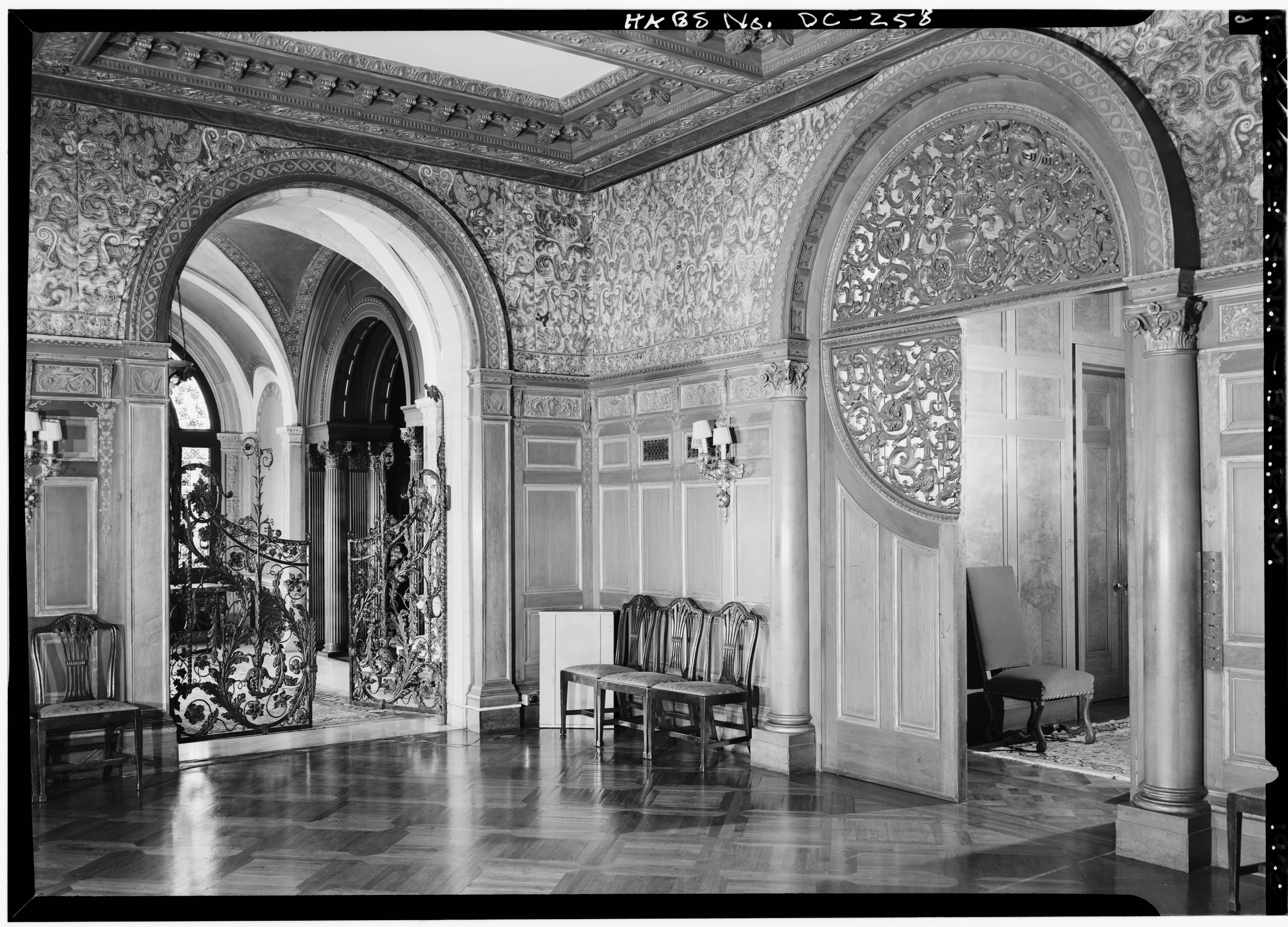
View from dining room toward conservatory, 1970

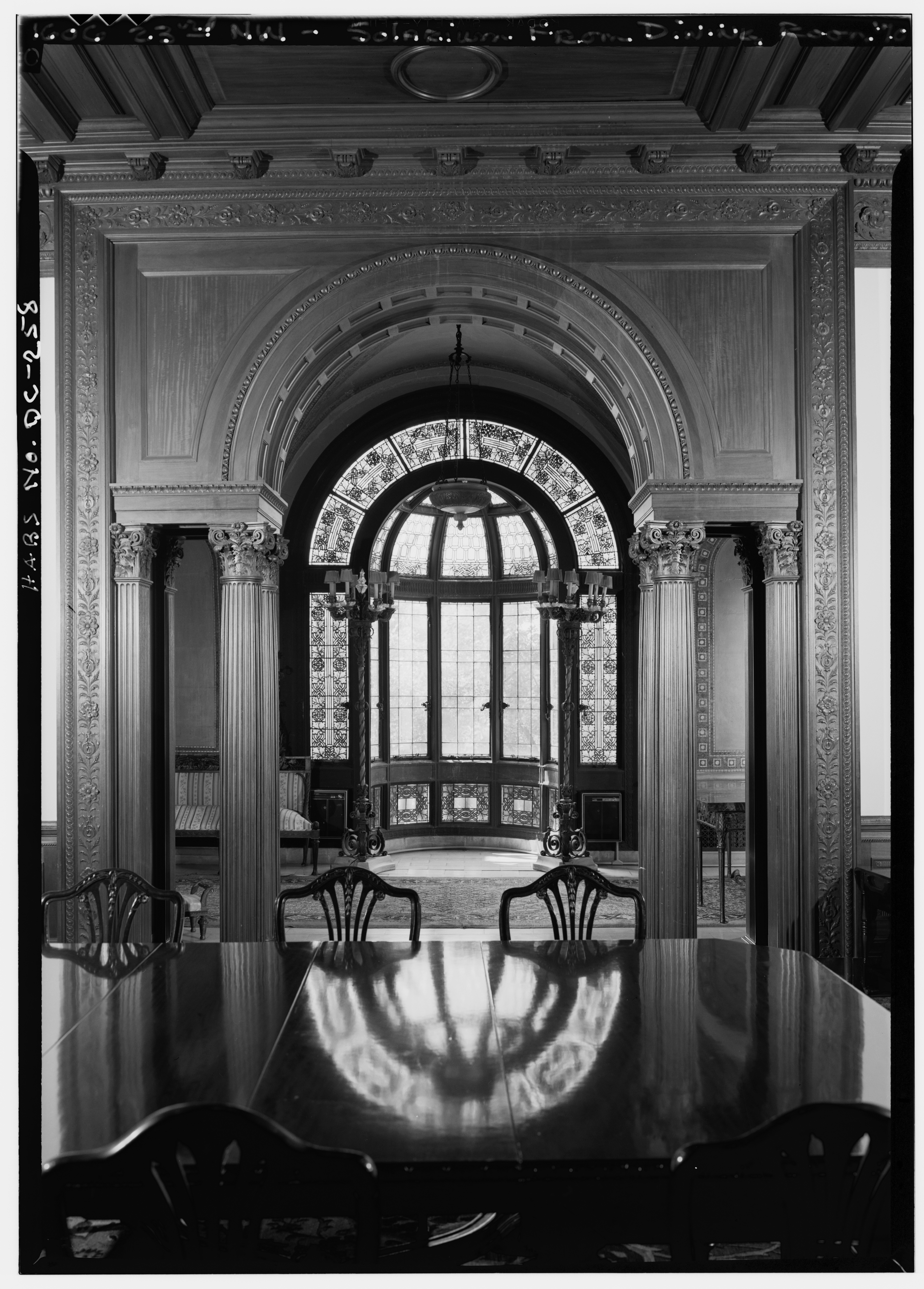
View from dining room toward conservatory, 1970

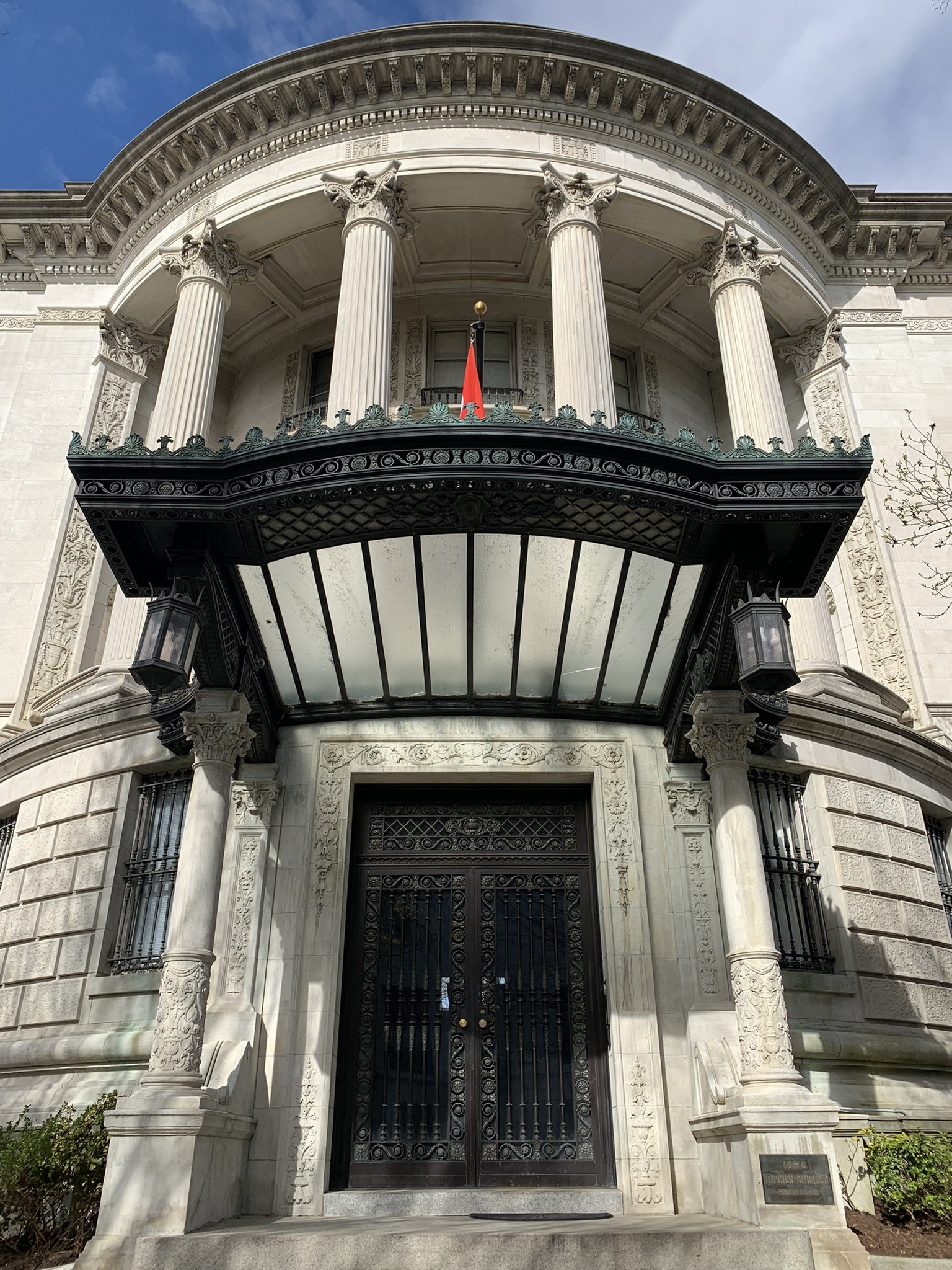
Main entrance

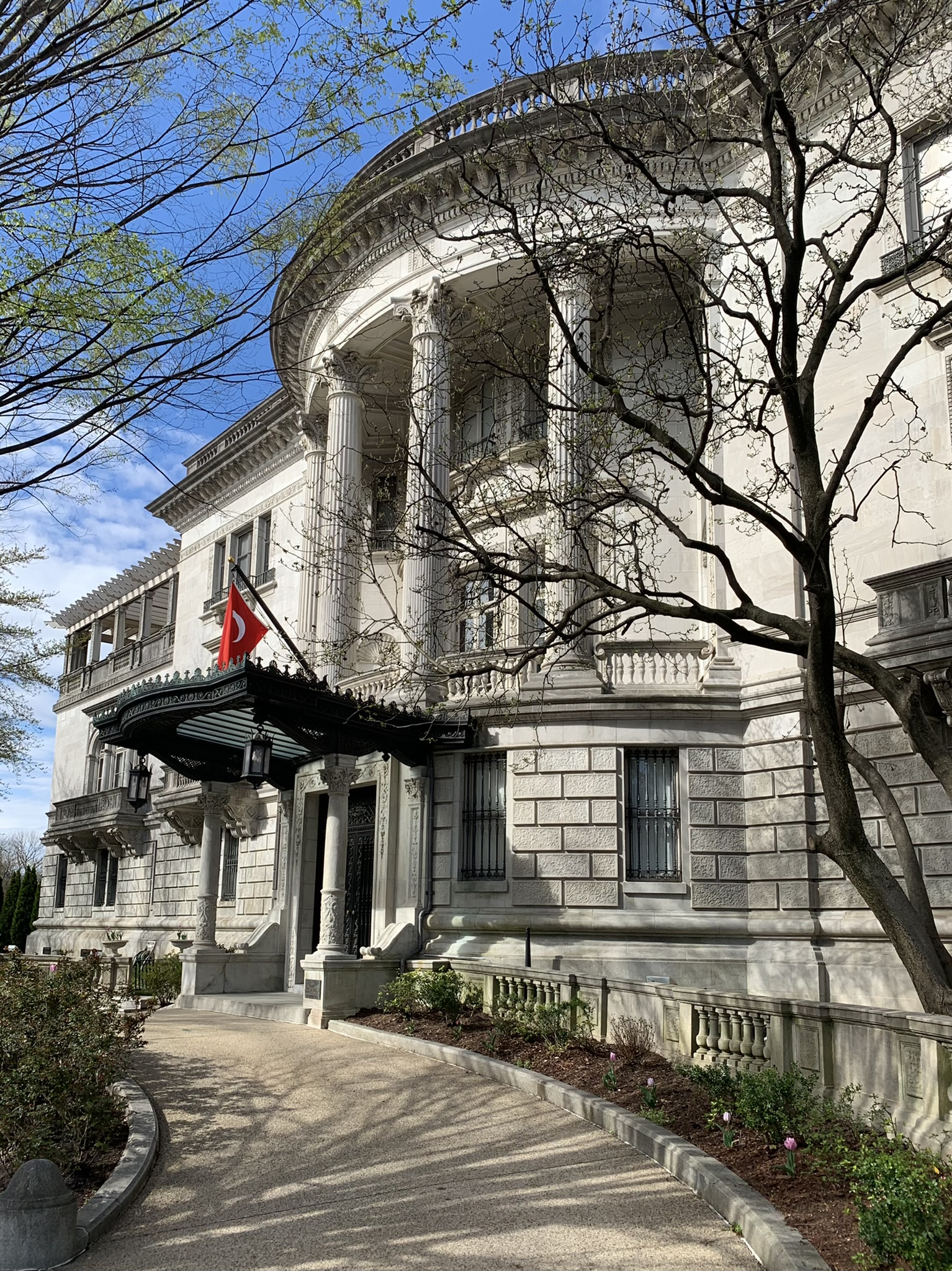
Driveway

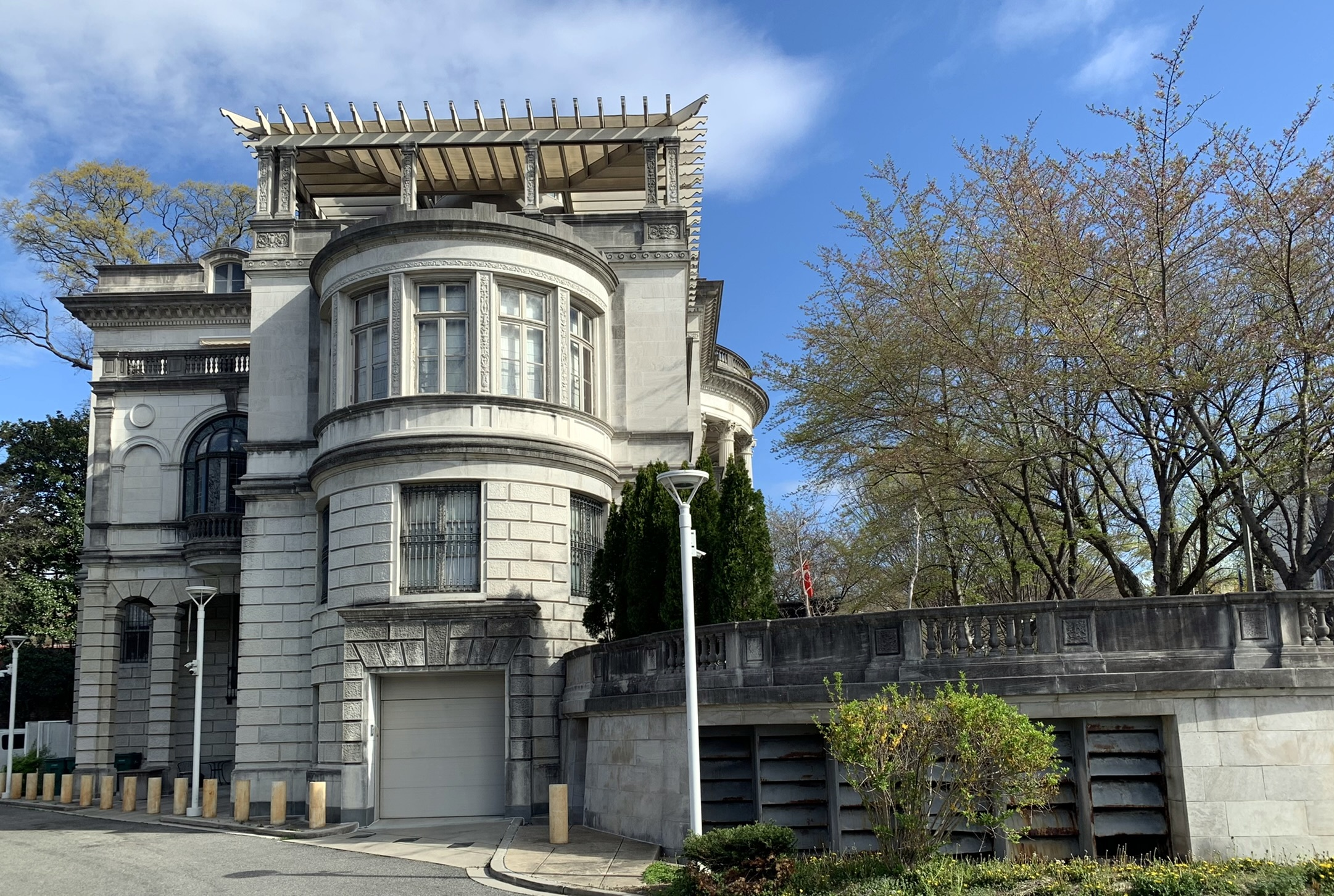
South side

== See also ==
- History of Washington, D.C.
