= Edward Hamlin Everett =

- Born: May 18, 1851; Cleveland, Ohio, U.S.
- Died: April 26, 1929 (aged 77); Boston, Massachusetts, U.S.
- Education: Phillips Academy
- Known for: Founder of the Bennington Museum
- Spouses: Amy Webster King (m. 1886; died 1917) Grace Belle Burnap (m. 1920)
- Children: 5
- Parent(s): Dr. Henry Everett; Mary Hamlin
- Relatives: Sylvester T. Everett (uncle); Henry W. Putnam (step-father)

Edward Hamlin Everett (May 18, 1851 – April 26, 1929) was a noted American businessman and philanthropist, and a founder of the Bennington Museum in Bennington, Vermont.

== Early life ==
Everett was born in Cleveland, Ohio, on May 18, 1851. He was a son of Dr. Henry Everett (1819–1854), a urologist who died when he was only three years old, and Mary (née Hamlin) (1830–1890). After his mother remarried to Henry W. Putnam, a businessman, inventor, manufacturer, and philanthropist, she moved to New York City and young Everett stayed in Cleveland with his uncle, Sylvester T. Everett. Sylvester was a financier who began his career at Cleveland's oldest banking house, Brockway, Wason, Everett & Co., which had been co-founded by Edward's father, Dr. Henry Everett. His uncle married a granddaughter of Jeptha Wade as his second wife. Through his mother, Edward was related to Hannibal Hamlin, Abraham Lincoln's first vice president.

Edward lived with his uncle in Cleveland for five years and spent summers in Bennington, Vermont, with his mother and stepfather. In 1866, Edward enrolled at Phillips Academy in Andover, Massachusetts. However, he left Phillips at the end of one year, and enrolled in Bennington High School, where he graduated two years later in 1869.

== Career ==
He began his career as a bottle salesman for his stepfather, Henry W. Putnam, the inventor of the Lightning fruit jar (a predecessor to the Mason jar). In 1870, he returned to Cleveland, where he took a job as a bank clerk, staying there for another seven or eight years during which he learned about glass manufacturing. He moved to Chicago sometime around 1877.

In September 1880, Everett purchased the Star Glass Works in Newark, Ohio, and five years later, in 1885, Everett renamed his company the E.H. Everett Company, capitalized at $100,000, of which he held 96% of the shares. Everett continued to acquire companies and expand his holdings before forming the Ohio Bottle Company, valued at $4 million, in 1904. A year later, he merged the Ohio Bottle Company with the Adolphus Busch Glass Manufacturing Company in St. Louis and a number of smaller Illinois and Ohio firms to form the American Bottle Company. The American Bottle Company later merged with Corning to eventually become Owens Corning.

In 1887, one of his workers in Ohio struck natural gas and, by 1906, Everett owned 50 gas wells in Licking and Knox County, later drilling over 400 wells. He expanded his investments later extended to cattle, real estate, orchids and apple orchards, and large stockholdings the Anheuser-Busch Co. His orchard of 70,000 trees at Old Bennington was once the largest one-man owned orchard in America. He was also one of the first manufacturers of automobiles. Between 1914 and 1924, his fruit orchard businesses in Vermont and Ohio suffered operating losses of over $600,000. In late 1919, he sold his Texas enterprises and properties near Port O'Connor for a loss of $133,000. In mid-1921, Everett was forced to cash out of his $3 million share of a $40 million New York syndicate that was to build two commercial buildings adjacent to Grand Central Terminal in Midtown Manhattan.

== Personal life ==
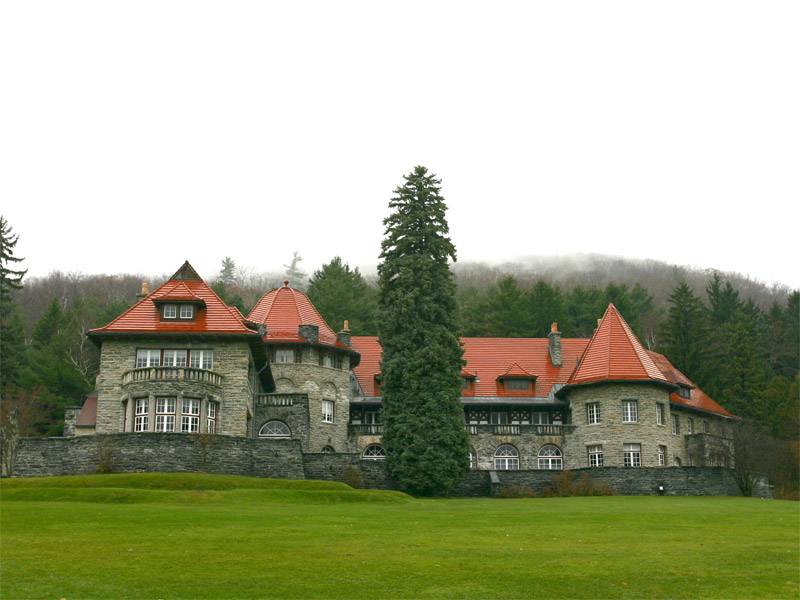
The Orchards, Everett's summer residence in Bennington, Vermont

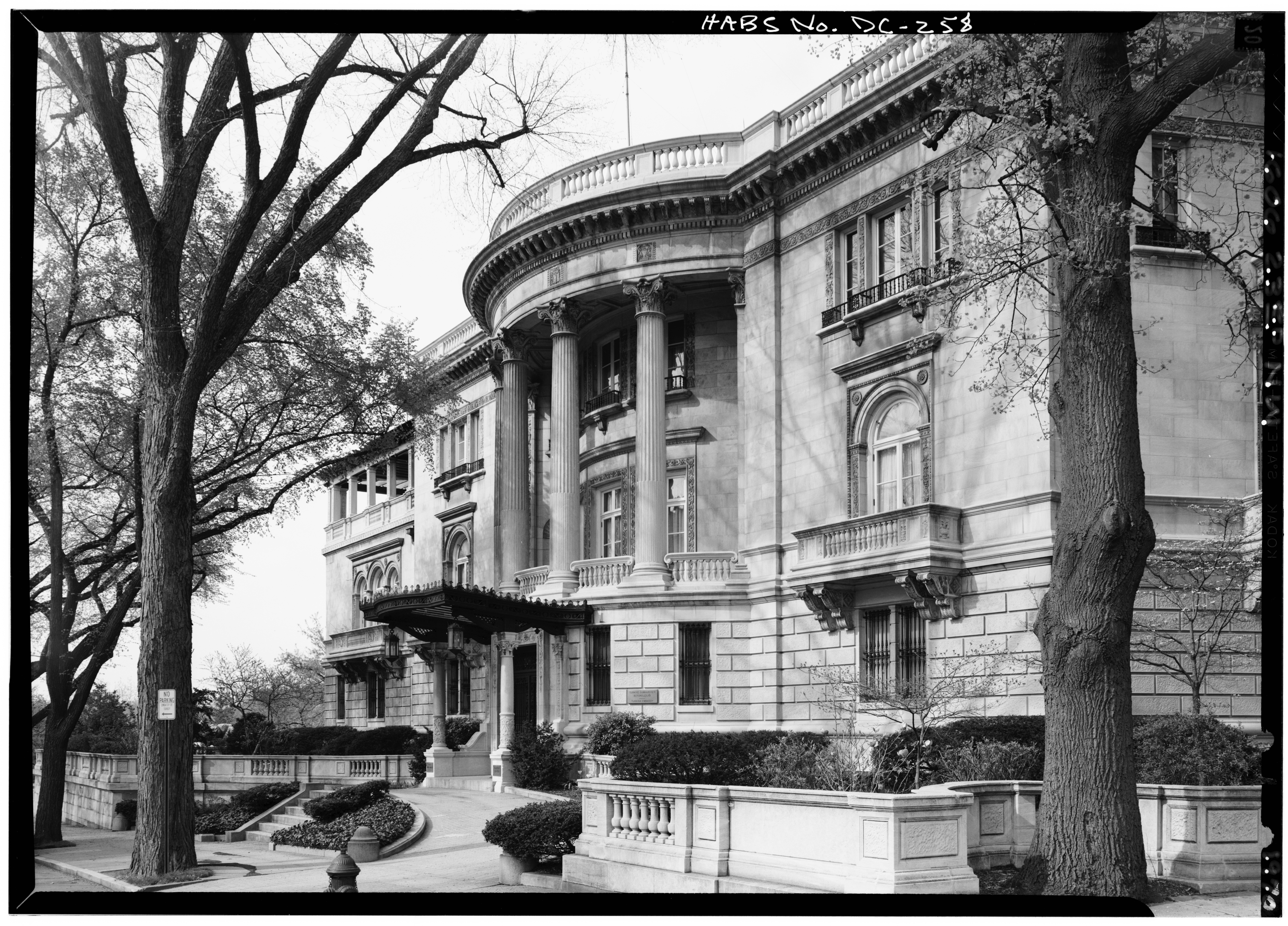
View of the Everett Mansion from Sheridan Square in Washington, D.C., designed by George Oakley Totten Jr.

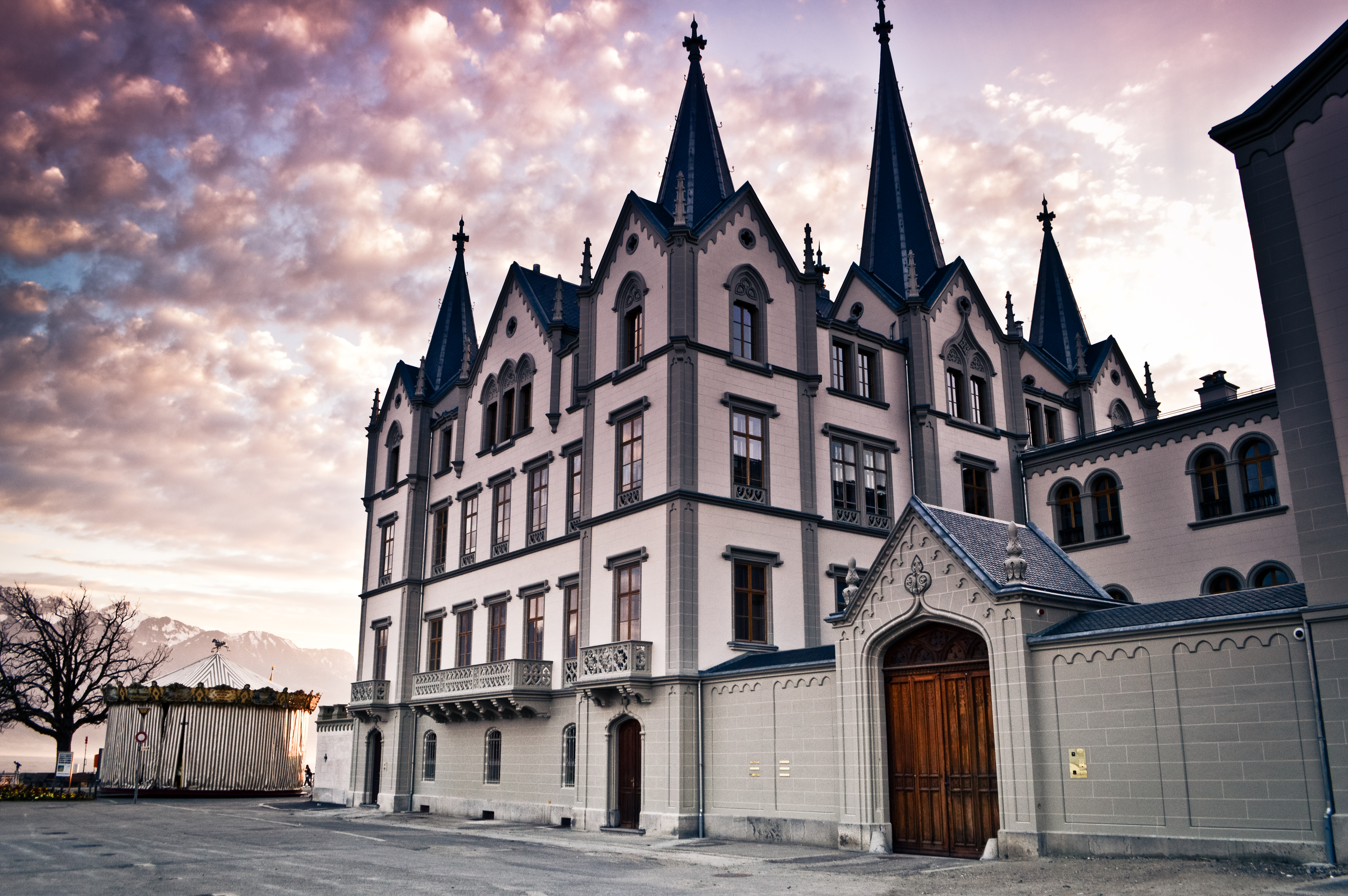
Everett's Château de l'Aile in Vevey, Switzerland

On July 8, 1886, Everett was married to Amy Webster King (1863–1917), the daughter of Oren Granger King, a business associate. Together, they were the parents of three daughters:

- Amy King Everett (1887–1964), who married Dr. Lucius Arthur Wing, a son of Charles Mayhew Wing.
- Mary Putnam Everett (1892–1961), who married Luigi Guilio Turri and lived in Italy.
- Anne Holton Everett (1897–1948), who married James Kirtland Selden of Methuen Mills.

In 1918, Everett was introduced to Grace Belle Burnap (1879–1969) at a dinner given by society hostess Mary Foote Henderson, widow of U.S. Senator John B. Henderson. Burnap was the sister of George Burnap, a landscape architect best known for Meridian Hill Park in Washington and St. Joseph Parkway in Missouri. After spending some time in Europe, Everett married Grace on March 27, 1920, at St. James Church in Chicago. A singer, Grace had attended the Boston Conservatory of Music and studied voice in Munich and Paris. Together, they were the parents of two more daughters:

- Grace Elizabeth Everett (1921–1945), who was with the Women Airforce Service Pilots during World War II, was killed in an airplane accident at the Bennington Airport.
- Sarah Everett (1922–2006), who married Horace D. McCowan Jr., a lawyer and chairman of the E. H. Everett Company, an oil and gas production company in Newark, Ohio in 1950.

In 1922, Everett was diagnosed with prostate cancer. Everett died at the Massachusetts General Hospital in Boston on April 26, 1929, of complications from prostate cancer surgery. He was buried in the Everett mausoleum in Park Lawn Cemetery in Bennington, Vermont (purportedly modeled after the Theseion at the Acropolis of Athens). Prior to the 1929 stock market crash, Everett's wealth was estimated to be between $40–50 million. However, it was greatly reduced due to the depression and poor business decisions in his later years. His last will left most of his estate to his second wife, Grace; however, his daughters from his first marriage contested the will. A legal battle ensued that would last for several years. In April 1936, Grace sold their Washington residence, and all its furnishings and interior decorations, to the Turkish government for $402,000.

=== Descendants ===
Though his youngest daughter Sarah, he was a grandfather of Grace Elizabeth "Lisa" McCowan, who married Thomas C. Foley in 1989. They divorced in January 1994 and Foley later served as the United States Ambassador to Ireland under George W. Bush.

=== Real estate ===
In 1912, Everett transferred title of his Newark home on Buena Vista Street to the help establish the town's first hospital, and later deeded 20 acres on Everett Avenue to the Newark Board of Education for Everett Park. From 1910 to 1915, Everett built a large mansion in Washington, D.C., known as the Edward Hamlin Everett House, from 1911 to 1914, he built a large summer residence in Bennington, known as The Orchards, on 500 acres of farm land (which later became the Southern Vermont College). He also vacationed at the Château de l'Aile in Vevey, Switzerland.

In June 1911, Everett purchased the venerable Richmond Hotel at 17th and H Streets, and several adjoining properties for $275,000. The Richmond, which was diagonally across from the Metropolitan Club had been built in 1883. Beginning in the summer of 1912, he extensively renovated and refurnished the hotel to make it more upscale and appealing to an affluent clientele.
