= Henry W. Putnam =

American businessman (born 1825)

- Born: 1 September 1825; Essex New York
- Died: 29 January 1915 (aged 89); San Rafael, California, United States
- Resting place: Old Bennington Cemetery; Bennington, Vermont

Henry William Putnam (1825–1915) was an American businessman, inventor, manufacturer, and philanthropist born in Essex, New York, and who later lived in Cleveland, Ohio, Bennington, Vermont, Escondido, California, and San Diego, California.

Putnam is known for inventions, improvements, and manufacturing of the Lightning stopper, fence wire barbing machine, and the adjustable clothes wringer. He donated a city water works system to the town of Bennington.

== Businessman ==
Putnam operated his businesses under the name Putnam Manufacturing Company, with plants in Bennington, Vermont, Cleveland, Ohio, and an office on Platt street in New York.

=== Putnam bottle top stopper ===
On March 15, 1859, Putnam was granted a United States patent for the Henry W. Putnam Stopper Fastening (US patent #23,263) that was reissued (US patent #1,606) on January 19, 1864. In this patent Putnam states being from New York but formally from Cleveland, Ohio. The Putnam Lightning stopper saw widespread use as a means to hold externally inserted corks into blob top soda bottles. On September 10, 1878 a patent (#207,982) was issued for an “Improvement in Bottle Stoppers and Bottle Fasteners”. On February 10, 1880 Putnam received a patent (#224,304) for the "Putnam Magic Stopper" that was an improvement to the Lightning stopper. He received Patent #256,857 on April 25, 1882, adapting the Lightning closure to wide-mouth jars. This became a successful challenger to the Mason jar’s screw cap.

On October 28, 1879, David E. Stevens received a patent (#231,001) that he assigned to Henry Putnam. The Newark Star Glass Company, run by Stevens and Richard F. Lumley, had closed in 1878 because of a glass workers strike. In 1880 Putnam's stepson, Edward Hamlin Everett, who previously owned the Edward H. Everett Glass Company, bought the Newark Star Glass Company. The sale was likely the reason for the patent assignment to Putnam.

=== Putnam Wringer ===
In 1861 Putnam received a United States patent for an adjustable clothes wringer, called the Putnam Wringer, that was also patented in Canada, England, and Australia.

=== Barbing machine ===
Putnam was issued a patent (#253,824) February 14, 1882, for a fence wire barbing machine.

=== Brooklyn Elevated Railway ===
Putnam was president of Brooklyn Elevated Railroad, and along with his son Henry W. Putnam Jr. was a director.
