= George Oakley Totten Jr. =

American architect (1866–1939)

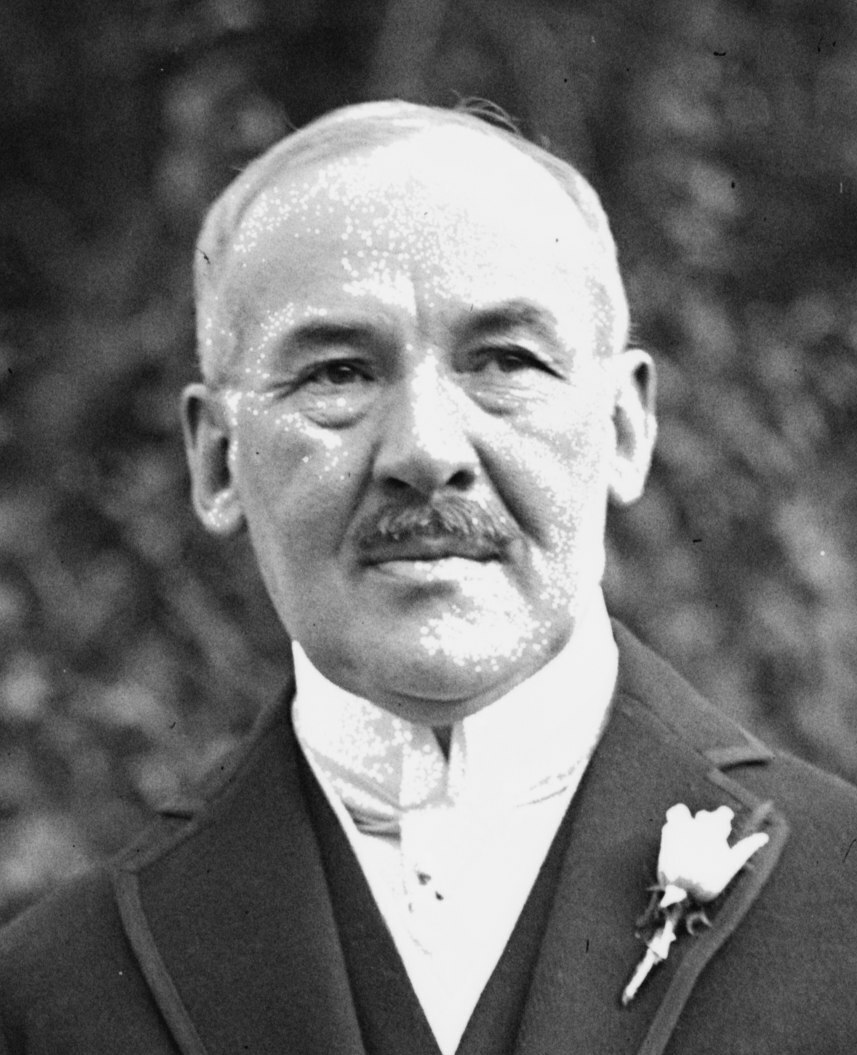
George O. Totten, 1921

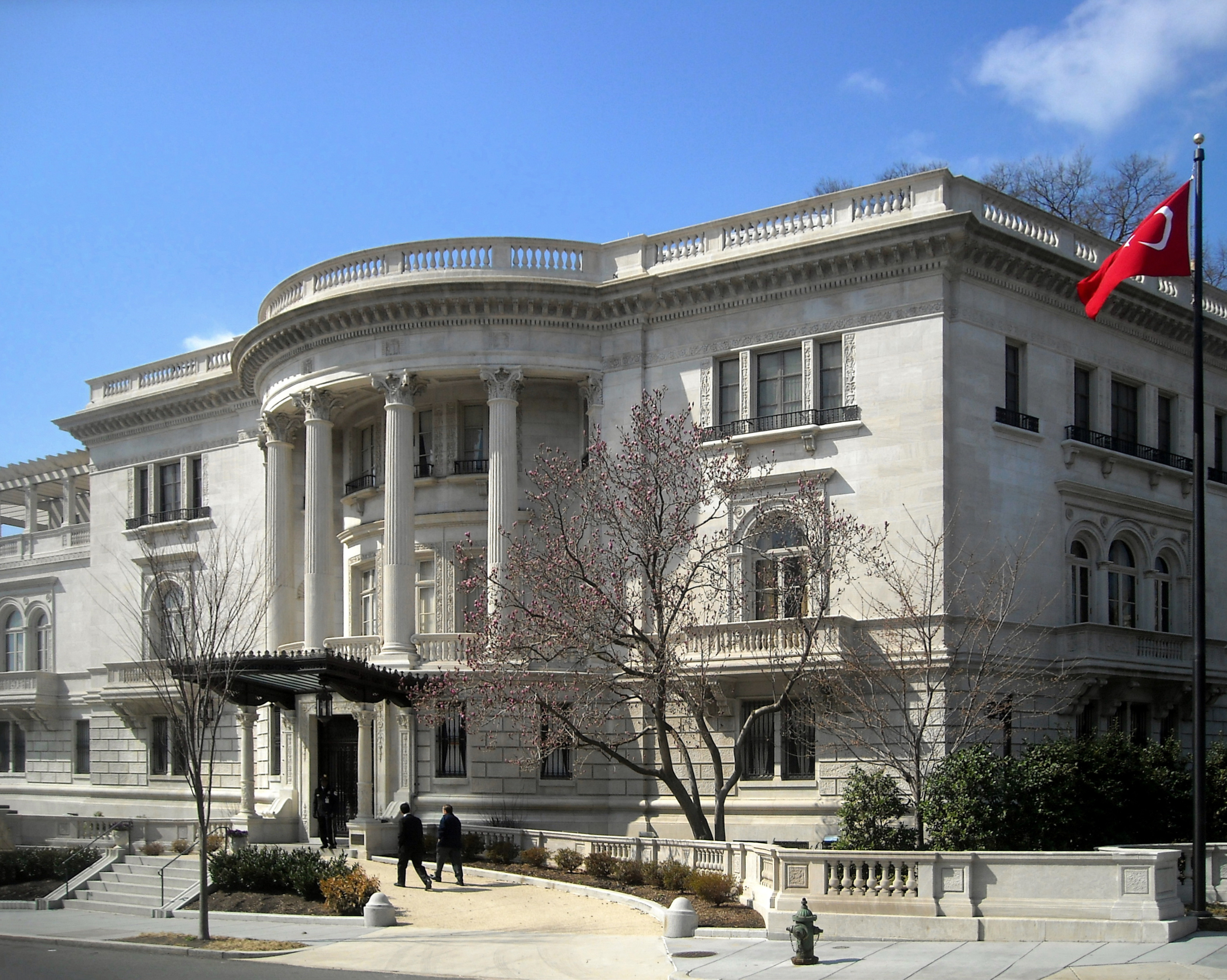
Edward H. Everett House, now the Turkish ambassador's residence.

George Oakley Totten Jr. (December 5, 1866 – February 1, 1939) was an American architect who was one of the most prolific architects in the Gilded Age in Washington D.C. He designed many mansions that were located primarily on or near Dupont, Sheridan (including Embassy Row), and Kalorama circles and along 16th Street, N.W., near Meridian Hill. Most now serve as embassies, chanceries, or offices for national or international organizations.

== Biography ==
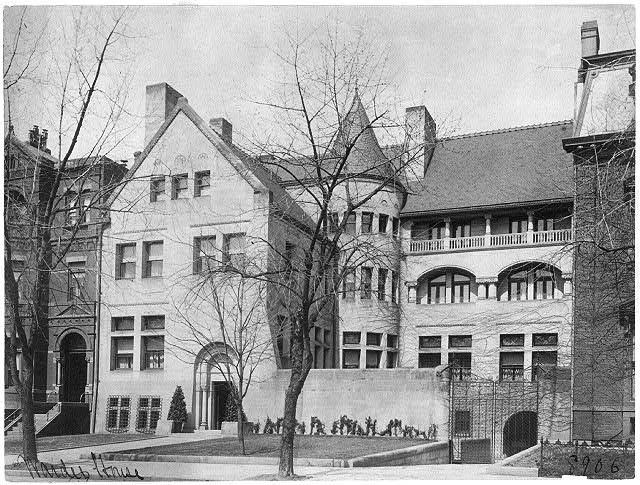
Totten rescued H. H. Richardson's Warder Mansion from demolition.

Totten was born in New York City on December 5, 1866, a son of George Oakley and Mary Elizabeth (Styles) Totten and a descendant of John Totten, from whom Tottenville, Staten Island, was named. After receiving his early education at public schools in Newark, New Jersey and the Newark Technical School, he graduated from Columbia University with a Ph.B in 1891 and an A.M. in 1892. He was awarded Columbia's McKim travelling fellowship in 1893, and for the next two years studied at the Ecole des Beaux Arts and Atelier Daumet-Esquie. He returned to the United States and in 1896, was appointed chief designer in the Office of the Supervising Architect, Department of the Treasury. He continued in that position until 1898, when he established an independent architectural practice in Washington D.C., which he continued until his death.

He was the architect for many public buildings in that city and drew plans for ten legations and embassy buildings, including the Turkish, Polish, Belgian, Norwegian, Spanish, Swedish, and Danish legations, and the former French embassy. He was an advisor when the U.S. Capitol Building was remodelled. He also designed many private city and country dwellings in Washington, including a group of houses in the 2600 block of 16th Street, N.W., representing several styles of architecture. He also designed homes in Vermont and New Jersey. He was architect for a number of government buildings including the post office at Waterbury, Connecticut and the $3 million post office and federal court building at Newark, New Jersey, that opened in 1934.

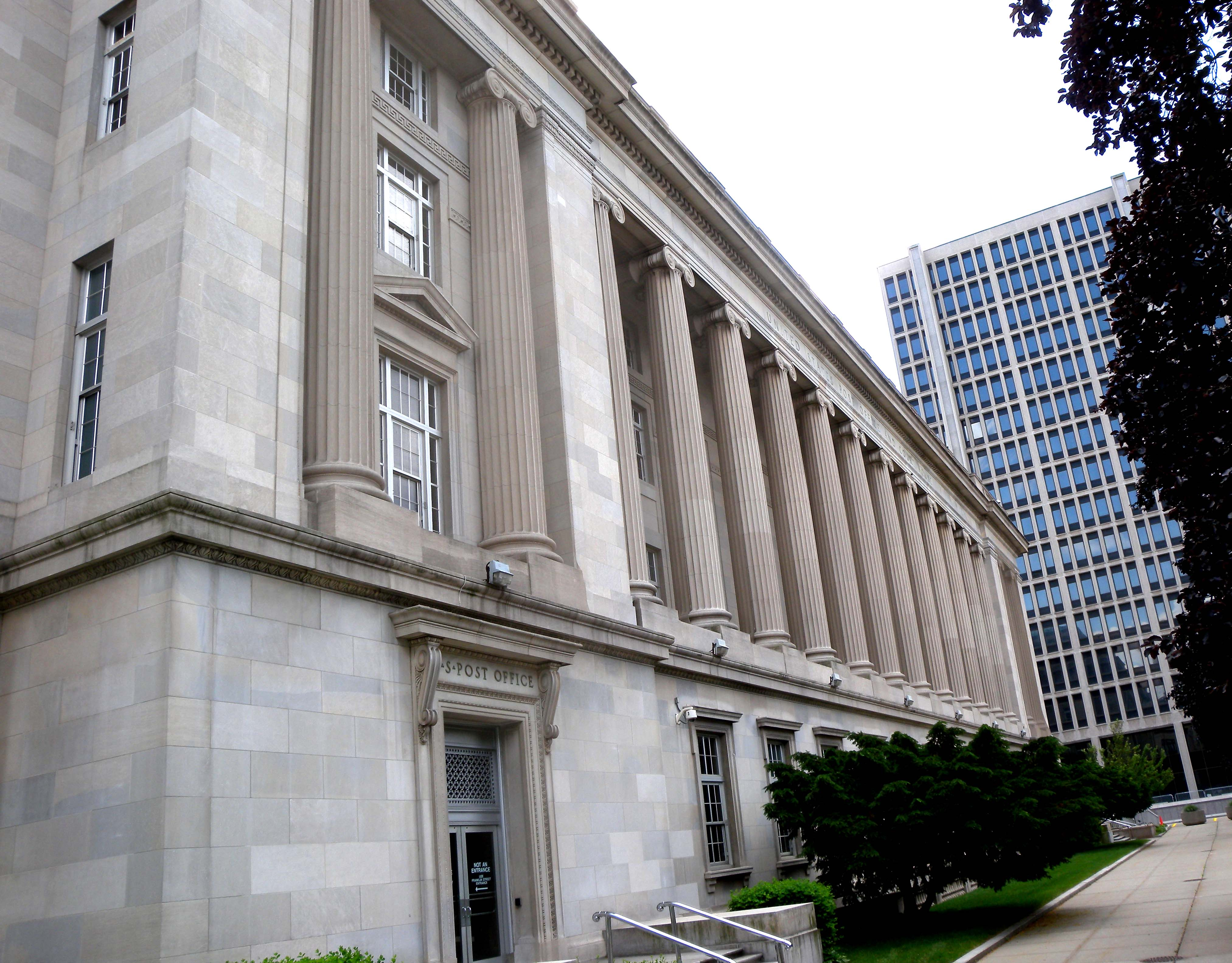
US Post Office and Courthouse Newark

In 1923, he rescued architect H. H. Richardson's Warder Mansion (1885–88), at 1515 K Street NW, from demolition. He had the stonework and some of the interiors dissassembled, transported them about 1.5 miles (2.4 km) from downtown to Meridian Hill, and re-erected the building alongside his house for use as apartments. The Warder Mansion is the only surviving building by Richardson in Washington, D.C.

He was active in professional architectural associations. From 1897 to 1939, he served as secretary and vice president of the American section of the permanent committee of the International Congress of Architects. During World War I, he served as a major with the Army Corps of Engineers. In 1926, he authored Maya Architecture.

On August 22, 1921, he married noted sculptor and artist Vicken von Post-Börjesson of Sweden. They had two sons: George Oakley Totten III, Distinguished Professor Emeritus of Political Science from the University of Southern California, and Gilbert von Post Totten. Totten died at Washington, D.C., on February 1, 1939.

== Selected works ==
Image	Building	Address	Year built	Notes
	Christian Hauge House	2349 Massachusetts Avenue NW, Washington, D.C.	1906	Now the Embassy of Cameroon.
	Pink Palace	2600 16th Street NW, Washington, D.C.	1906	House built for Franklin MacVeagh. Now the Inter-American Defense Board headquarters.
	Old French Embassy	2400 16th Street NW, Washington, D.C.	1907	Originally served as the Embassy of France, later as the Embassy of Ghana and headquarters of the Council for Professional Recognition
	B. F. Moran House	2315 Massachusetts Avenue NW, Washington, D.C.	1908	Previous Embassy of Pakistan building, vacant since the early 2000s.
	Amaryllis Gillett House	2225 R Street NW, Washington, D.C.	1909	Now the Embassy of Armenia.
	Henderson House	2622 16th Street NW, Washington, D.C.	1909	House built for Senator John B. Henderson and Mary Foote Henderson. Now the Embassy of Lithuania.
	Embassy of Poland	2640 16th Street NW, Washington, D.C.	1910	House built for the Hendersons. Now the Embassy of Lithuania.
	The Orchards	Bennington, Vermont	1911	Mansion built for Edward Hamlin Everett. Was Southern Vermont College until 2019. On the NRHP (No. 00000384).
	Edward Hamlin Everett House	1606 23rd Street NW, Washington, D.C.	1914	Built for Edward Hamlin Everett. Now the Residence of the Ambassador of Turkey.
	Congressional Club	2001 New Hampshire Avenue NW, Washington, D.C.	1917	On the NRHP (No. 11000717).
	Embassy of Ecuador Building	2535 15th Street NW, Washington, D.C.	1922	Now the Embassy of Ecuador.
	Meridian Hall	2401 15th Street NW, Washington, D.C.	1923	Building commissioned by Mary Foote Henderson. Now the Art of Living Foundation D.C. headquarters. On the NRHP (No. 90002147).
	Langley Park	8151 15th Avenue, Langley Park, Maryland	1924	Now the CASA of Maryland multicultural services building. On the NRHP (No. 08000809).
	House at 2437 15th Street NW	2437 15th Street NW, Washington, D.C.	1927	Built for Mary Foote Henderson. Now the Josephine Butler Parks Center. On the NRHP (No. 88000171).
	Embassy Building No. 10	3149 16th Street NW, Washington, D.C.	1928	Commissioned by Mary Foote Henderson. On the NRHP (No. 86003023).
