= Sheridan Circle =

Traffic circle in Washington D.C.

- U.S. Historic district – Contributing property
- D.C. Inventory of Historic Sites
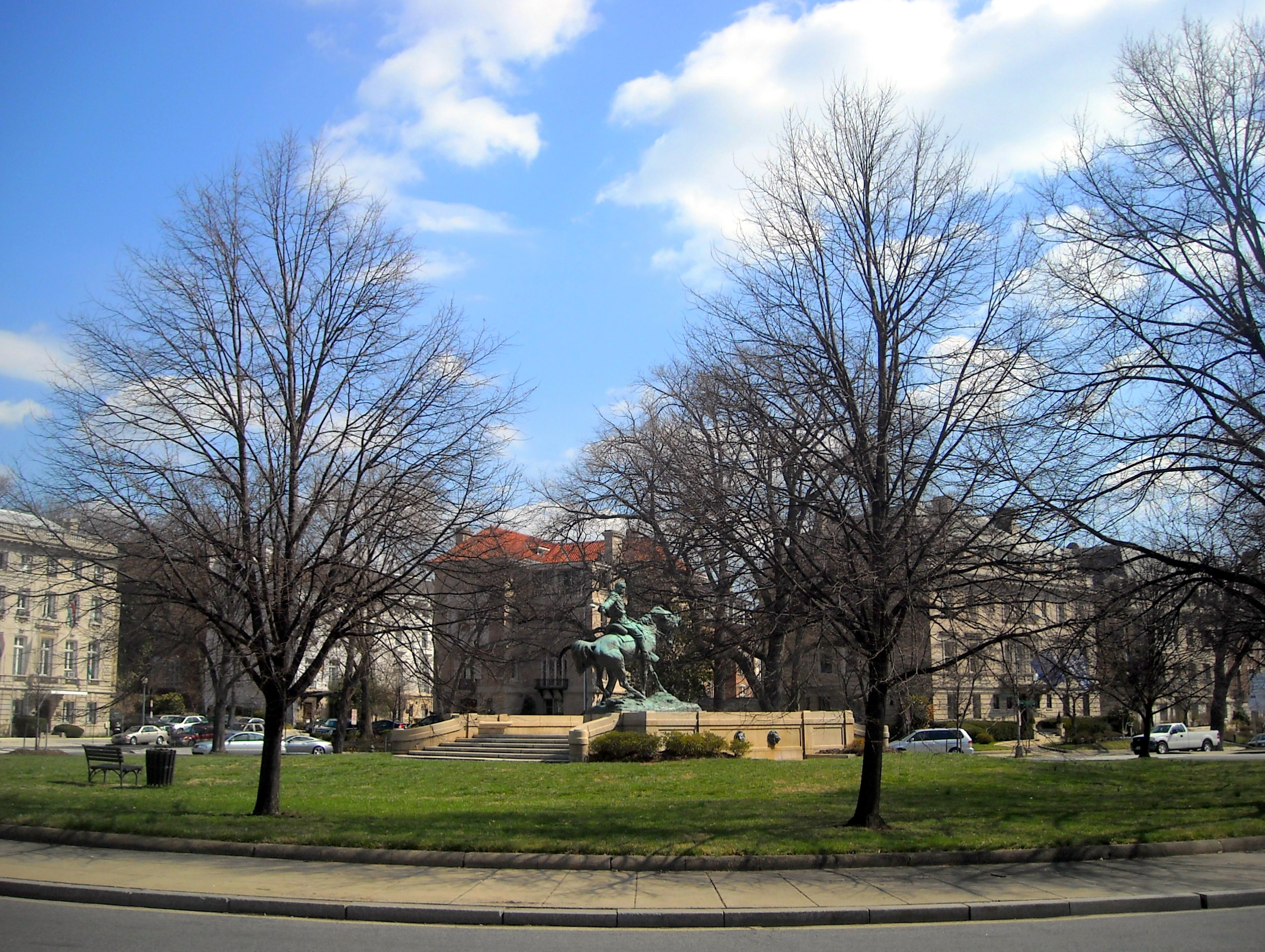
- Sheridan Circle including the statue of Philip Sheridan
- Location: Intersection of Massachusetts Avenue, R Street, and 23rd Street NW Washington, D.C., United States
- Coordinates: 38°54′43.8″N 77°03′02.4″W
- Part of: Massachusetts Avenue Historic District; Sheridan-Kalorama Historic District
- NRHP reference No.: 74002166 (Massachusetts Avenue Historic District); 89001743 (Sheridan-Kalorama Historic District)

Significant dates
- Added to NRHP: October 22, 1974 (Massachusetts Avenue Historic District); October 30, 1989 (Sheridan-Kalorama Historic District)
- Designated DCIHS: November 27, 1973 (Massachusetts Avenue Historic District); August 16, 1989 (Sheridan-Kalorama Historic District)

Sheridan Circle is a traffic circle and park in the Sheridan-Kalorama neighborhood of Washington, D.C. The traffic circle, one of two in the neighborhood, is the intersection of 23rd Street NW, Massachusetts Avenue NW, and R Street NW. The buildings along this stretch of Massachusetts Avenue NW are part of Embassy Row, which runs from Scott Circle to Observatory Circle. Sheridan Circle is a contributing property to the Massachusetts Avenue Historic District and the Sheridan-Kalorama Historic District, both listed on the National Register of Historic Places (NRHP). In addition, the equestrian statue of General Philip Sheridan is 1 of 18 Civil War Monuments in Washington, D.C., that were collectively listed on the NRHP.

The area around Sheridan Circle did not develop until the 1880s-1890s. Local officials extended Massachusetts Avenue NW past what was then the city's boundary, now Florida Avenue, in hopes of recreating the residential success of Dupont Circle. The Sheridan-Kalorama area was previously home to large estates and country homes. These lands were eventually sold and the traffic circle's name was changed from Decatur Circle, in honor of Commodore Stephen Decatur, to Sheridan Circle, in honor of Civil War General Philip Sheridan. It took many years for the equestrian statue of Sheridan to be created, and the dedication of the memorial took place in 1908. By that time, houses were being built around the circle, including the first one, the Alice Pike Barney Studio House.

The remaining homes around the circle were elaborate mansions, designed by some of the top local and national architects. During the Great Depression, some of the residences were sold to foreign countries. This occurred again after World War II and into the 1950s. Some of the embassies and ambassadorial residences facing Sheridan Circle include Romania, Ireland, Greece, Vietnam, Kenya, Egypt, South Korea, Latvia, and Turkey.

Two violent moments that occurred at Sheridan Circle were the assassination of Orlando Letelier and Ronni Karpen Moffitt by Chile's Dirección de Inteligencia Nacional. Those that took part in the car bomb attack were Cuban expatriates who supported Chilean dictator Augusto Pinochet. There is a small monument by the circle in honor of the two victims. The other violent moment took place in 2017 when clashes broke out between the Kurdistan Workers' Party (PKK) supporters and Kurdish separatists who were protesting Turkish President Recep Tayyip Erdoğan. The protesters and reporters were beaten by Erdoğan's security detail. The victims later opened a civil case against the Turkish government.

== Location and significance ==
Sheridan Circle, the city's Reservation 57A, is the intersection of 23rd Street NW, Massachusetts Avenue NW, and R Street NW, in the Sheridan-Kalorama neighborhood of Washington, D.C. It is one of two traffic circles in the neighborhood, the other being Kalorama Circle. The circle and its surrounding buildings are contributing properties to two historic districts. The first one, Massachusetts Avenue Historic District, was added to the District of Columbia Inventory of Historic Sites (DCIHS) on November 27, 1973, and listed on the National Register of Historic Places (NRHP) on October 22, 1974. The second is the Sheridan-Kalorama Historic District, added to the DCIHS on August 16, 1989, and listed on the NRHP on October 30, 1989.

== History ==
=== 19th-century ===
The area that now encompasses Sheridan Circle, and much of the present-day Sheridan-Kalorama neighborhood, were originally large estates built outside the city's boundary. Local government officials announced in 1886 that development would be expanded beyond Boundary Street (renamed Florida Avenue in 1890). The plan was to extend Massachusetts Avenue NW northward past Rock Creek. Two traffic circles were also planned in the extension and most of the surrounding area was to be plotted and have streets laid out within a year.

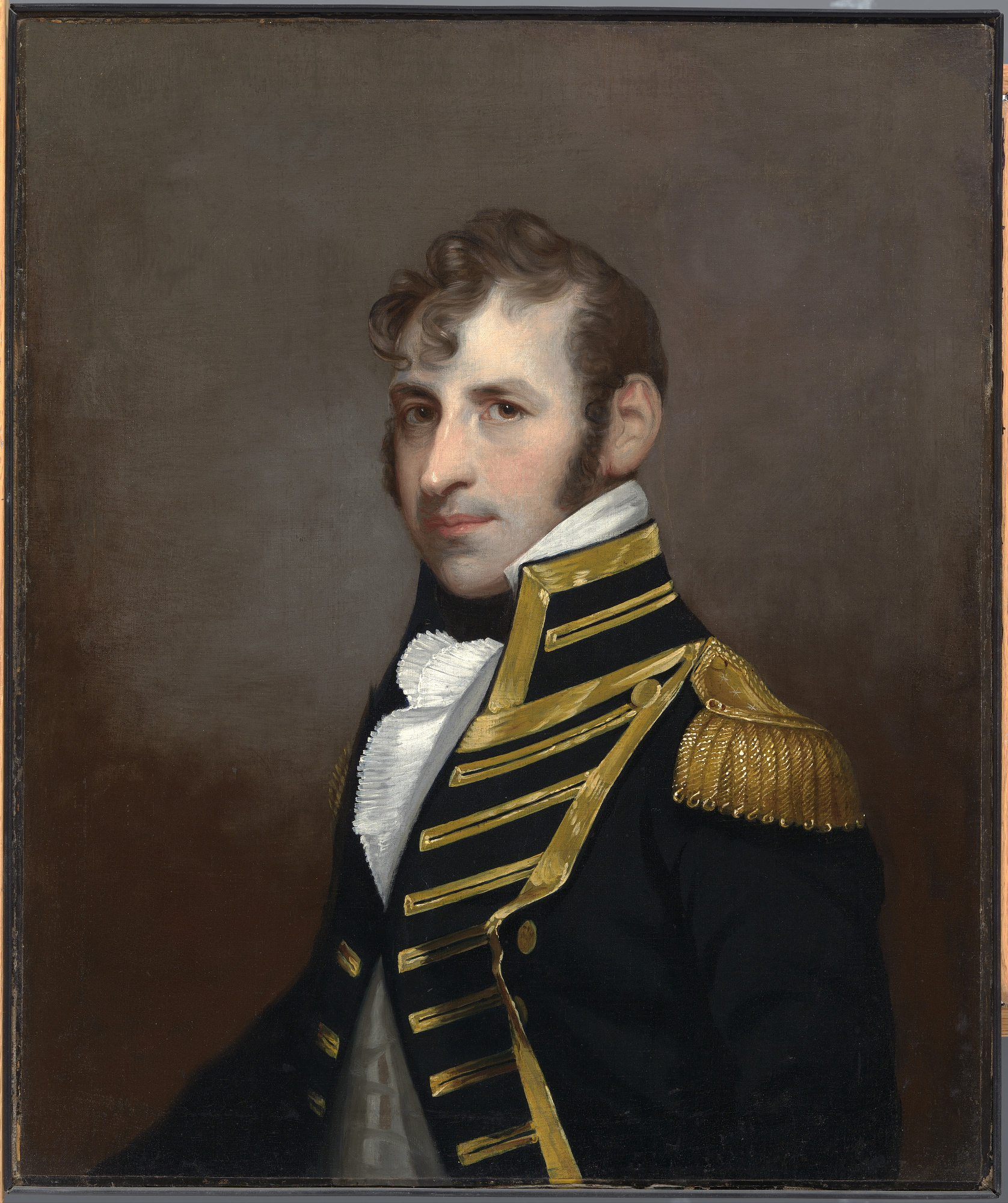
The circle was originally named Decatur Circle in honor of Commodore Stephen Decatur.

The land that was previously the Lovett estate and the Barlow-Bomford mausoleum is where present-day Sheridan Circle is located. The earliest developments in the Sheridan-Kalorama neighborhood took place near Decatur Circle, the original name of Sheridan Circle. It was named in honor of United States Navy Commodore Stephen Decatur, but renamed in 1890, in honor of Civil War General Philip Sheridan.

Dupont Circle, a neighborhood to the east, became a fashionable residential area in the 1880s. Development past the Dupont Circle boundaries began that same decade, and by 1887, the lots along Massachusetts Avenue had been plotted. Soon, there were large residences being built along the avenue towards Decatur Circle. In the 1890s, the city's boundary was extended past Rock Creek, but city officials had to build a new bridge over the creek and pave Massachusetts Avenue before further development could occur.

=== 20th-century ===
The stone bridge that carried people and goods over Rock Creek on Massachusetts Avenue was replaced with an iron bridge in 1901, which was also replaced in the 1940s and named the Charles C. Glover Memorial Bridge. The large residences built along Massachusetts Avenue were designed by prominent architects from Washington, D.C., as well as ones from other major cities. Most of the residences built around Sheridan Circle were free-standing mansions, occupied by prominent members of society. The first house to be constructed that faced the circle was the Alice Pike Barney Studio House, an eclectic example of Spanish Colonial Revival architecture, which Alice Pike Barney used as an art studio and residence. Foreign governments also became interested in building stylish, large embassies around the circle.

==== Sheridan statue ====
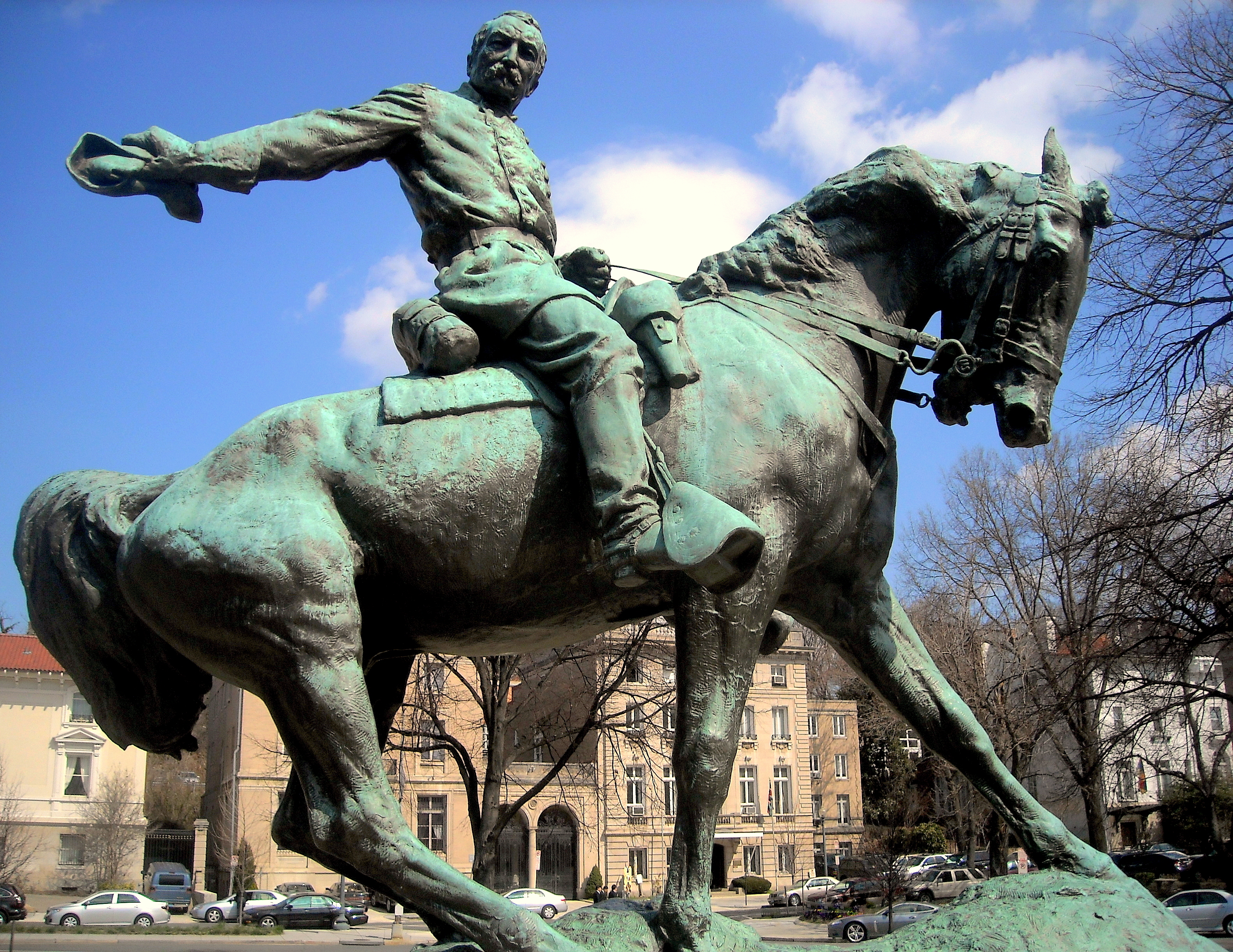
The statue of Philip Sheridan stands in the middle of the traffic circle.

A statue to honor General Sheridan was originally proposed to stand on the north side of Pennsylvania Avenue NW near 13th Street NW, at what is now Freedom Plaza. Sheridan's widow advocated to erect the statue at Sheridan Circle instead, with which the statue commission agreed. John Quincy Adams Ward was selected to sculpt the statue. Mrs. Sheridan rejected his original model, saying it was not a good likeness of her husband, and the statue commission rejected Ward's model. The commission and Mrs. Sheridan both approved of a model created by Gutzon Borglum, one that was modeled after Philip Sheridan Jr. The statue and the surrounding park were dedicated on November 27, 1908, and is one of 18 Civil War Monuments in Washington, D.C., listed on the NRHP on September 20, 1978, and the DCIHS on March 3, 1979.

In the years following World War I, there was an explosion in growth of new buildings in the area. Many prominent local and national architects designed palatial residences around Sheridan Circle. During the Great Depression, many of the local residences were sold to foreign nations or various groups. After World War II ended, many of the area residences were renovated into embassies, ambassadorial residences, and attachés.

Examples include the following: the Edward Hamlin Everett House, designed by George Oakley Totten Jr., is the ambassadorial residence for Turkey; the mansion at 2234 Massachusetts Avenue NW, designed by William Penn Cresson, is the Irish embassy; the mansion at 1607 23rd Street NW, designed by Carrère and Hastings, is the Romanian embassy; the Joseph Beale House, designed by Glenn Brown, is the ambassadorial residence for Egypt; 2221 Massachusetts Avenue NW, designed by Totten Jr., is the Greek embassy; the Emma S. Fitzhugh House, designed by Wood, Donn & Deming, is the ambassadorial residence for the Philippines; and 2249 R Street NW, designed by Nathan C. Wyeth, is the ambassadorial residence for Kenya. Additional countries who own buildings on the circle include South Korea (consular section) and Vietnam. The American Society of International Law's headquarters is on the east side of the circle at 2223 Massachusetts Avenue NW.

==== Assassination ====
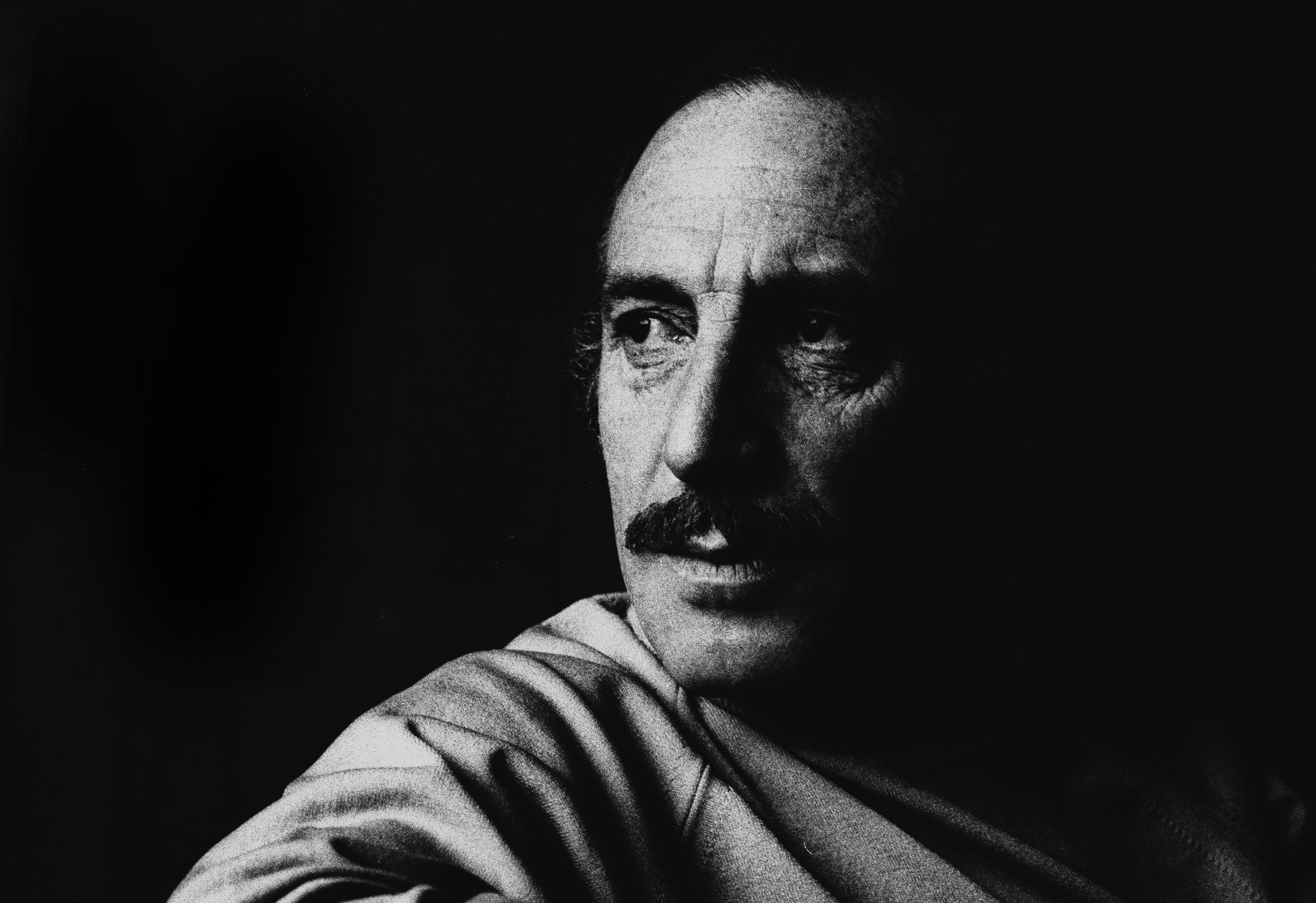
Orlando Letelier in 1976, the year he was assassinated at Sheridan Circle

On September 21, 1976, Orlando Letelier and Ronni Karpen Moffitt were killed by a car bomb in the circle. Letelier had been foreign minister in the ousted Allende government of Chile. The bombing was blamed on Chilean DINA agents. Michael Townley, a DINA U.S. expatriate among those convicted for the crime, confessed that he had hired five anti-Castro Cuban exiles to booby-trap Letelier's car. According to Jean-Guy Allard, after consultations with the Coordination of United Revolutionary Organizations leadership (including Luis Posada Carriles and Orlando Bosch), those selected to carry out the murder were Cuban Americans José Dionisio Suárez, Virgilio Paz Romero, Alvin Ross Díaz, and brothers Guillermo and Ignacio Novo Sampol.

According to news reports, Luis Posada Carriles was at the meeting that decided on Letelier's death and also about the Cubana bombing two weeks later. Letelier and Moffitt are commemorated with a small plaque embedded in the grass along the curb where they died, near the Irish and Romanian embassies. In 2023, Chilean President Gabriel Boric visited the memorial site where he placed flowers.

=== 21st-century ===
==== Clashes ====
On May 16, 2017, dozens of Kurdistan Workers' Party (PKK) supporters and Kurdish separatists clashed with Turkish security officials at Sheridan Circle. Turkish security personnel beat journalists and protesters during the skirmish. Turkish President Recep Tayyip Erdoğan, visiting the ambassadorial residence on the circle, watched the clashes from a distance. During a civil suit by some of the PKK supporters against the Turkish government, a U.S. judge denied Turkey's citing the Foreign Sovereign Immunities Act as to why the case should be dismissed.

== Gallery ==
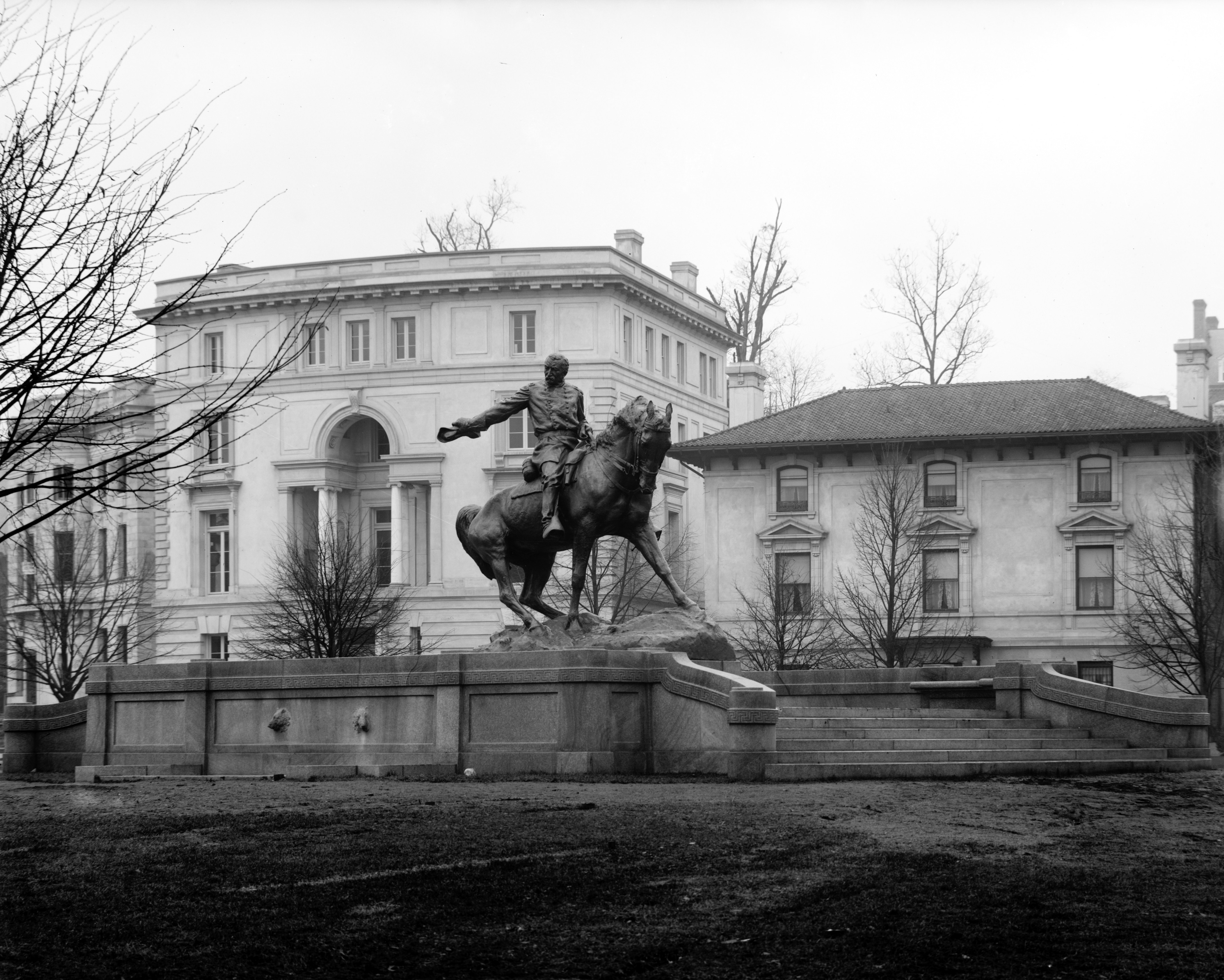
The statue of Philip Sheridan in the 1910s

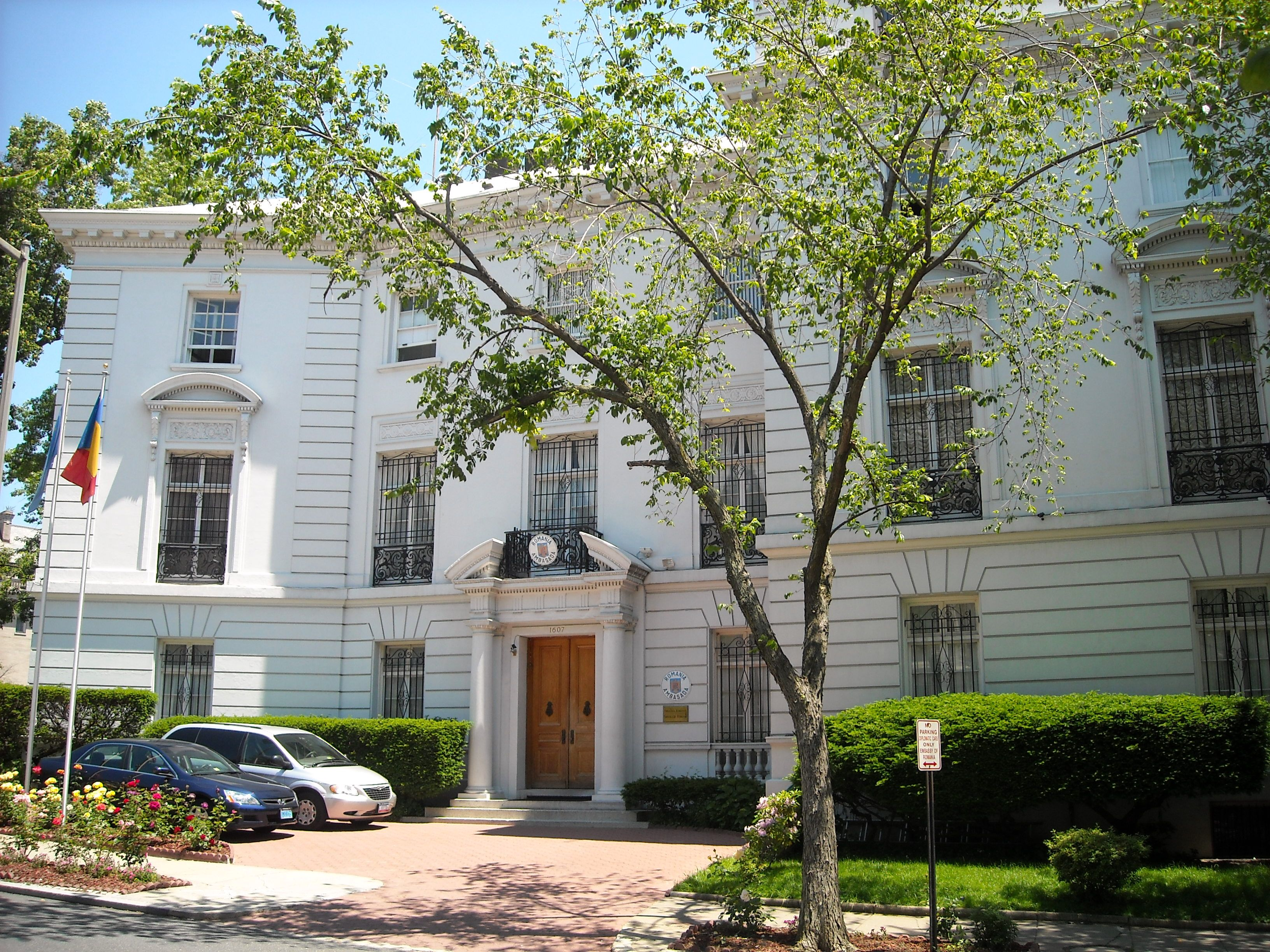
Romanian embassy

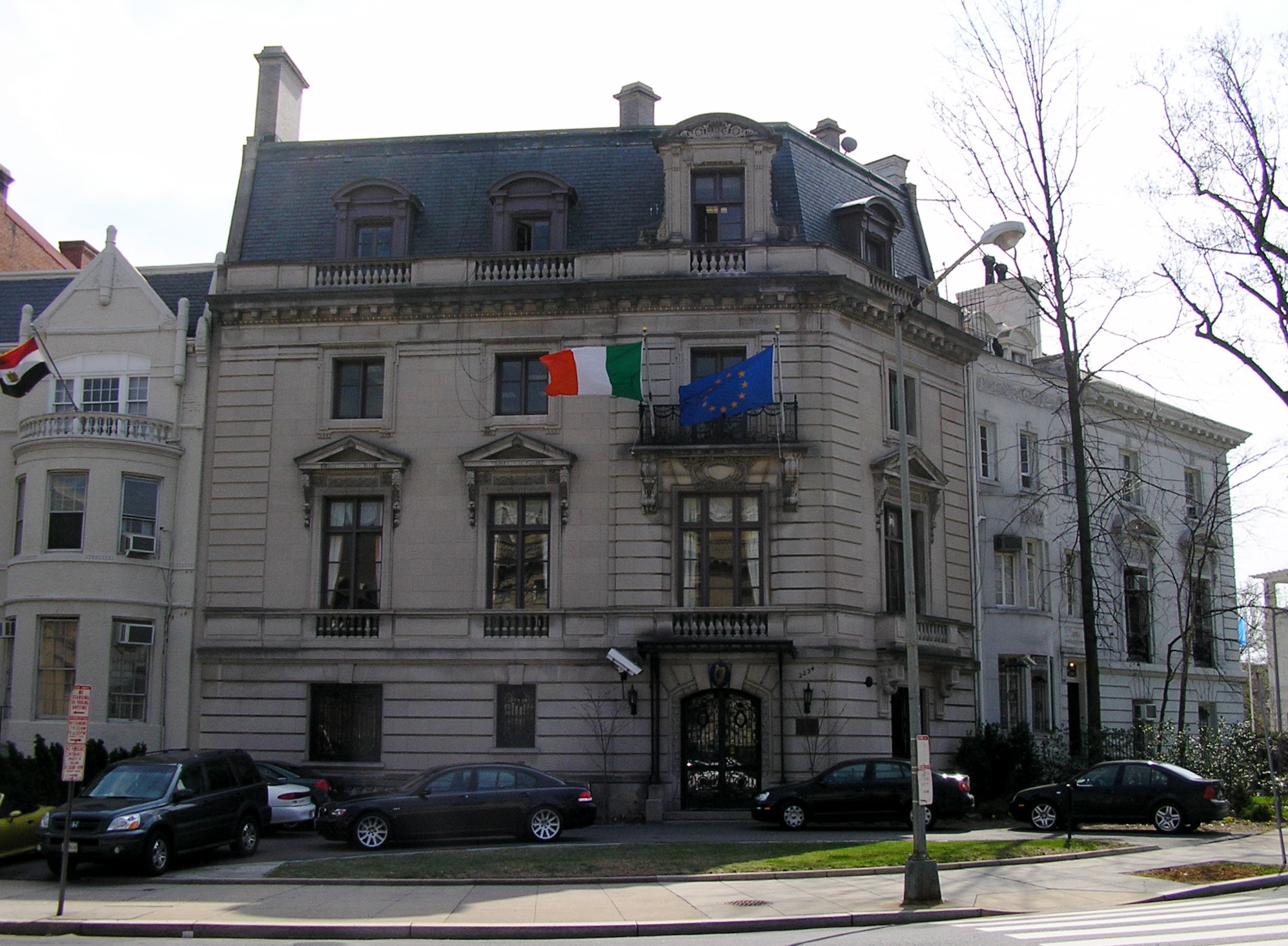
Irish embassy

Greek embassy

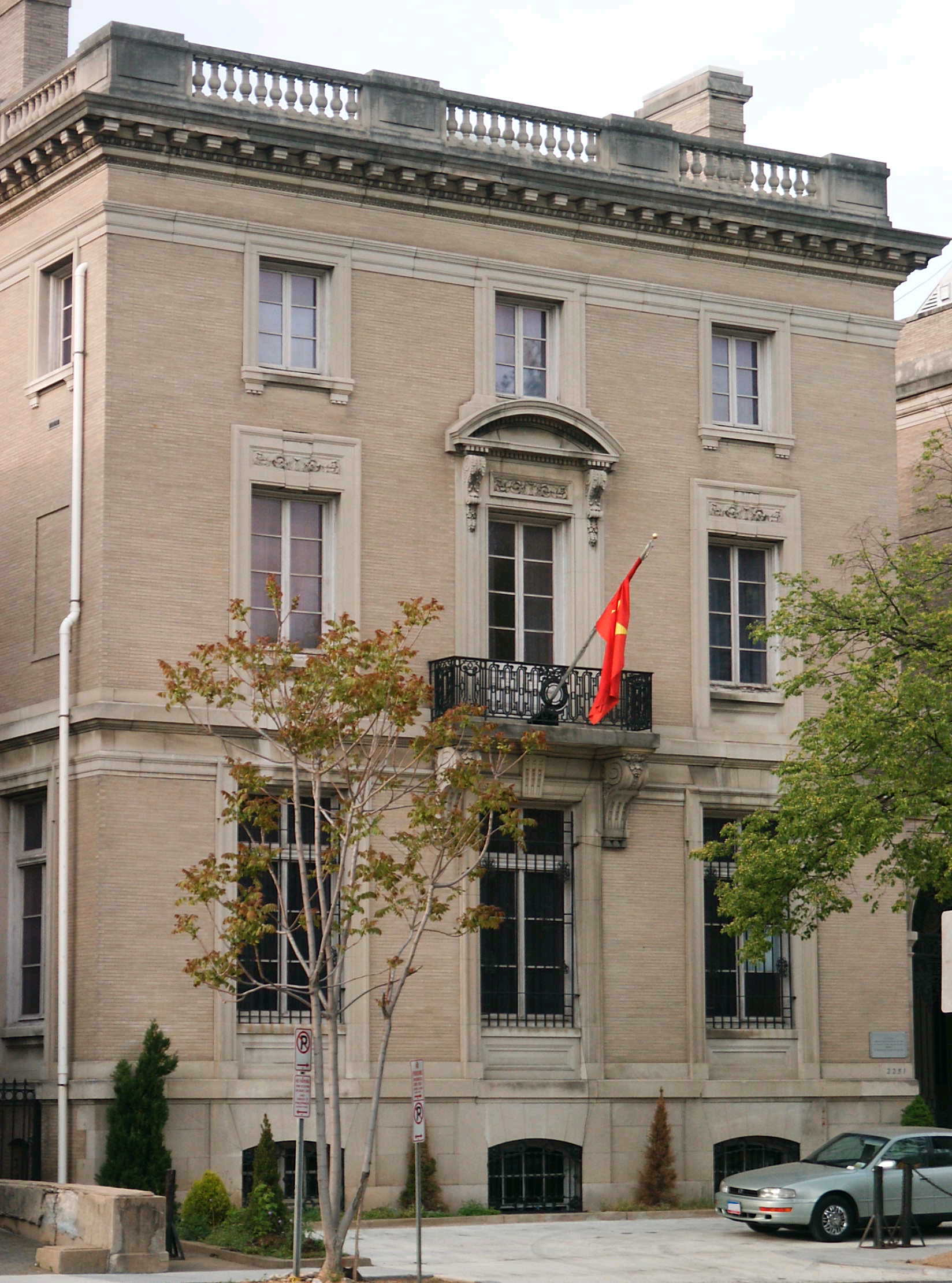
Vietnamese embassy

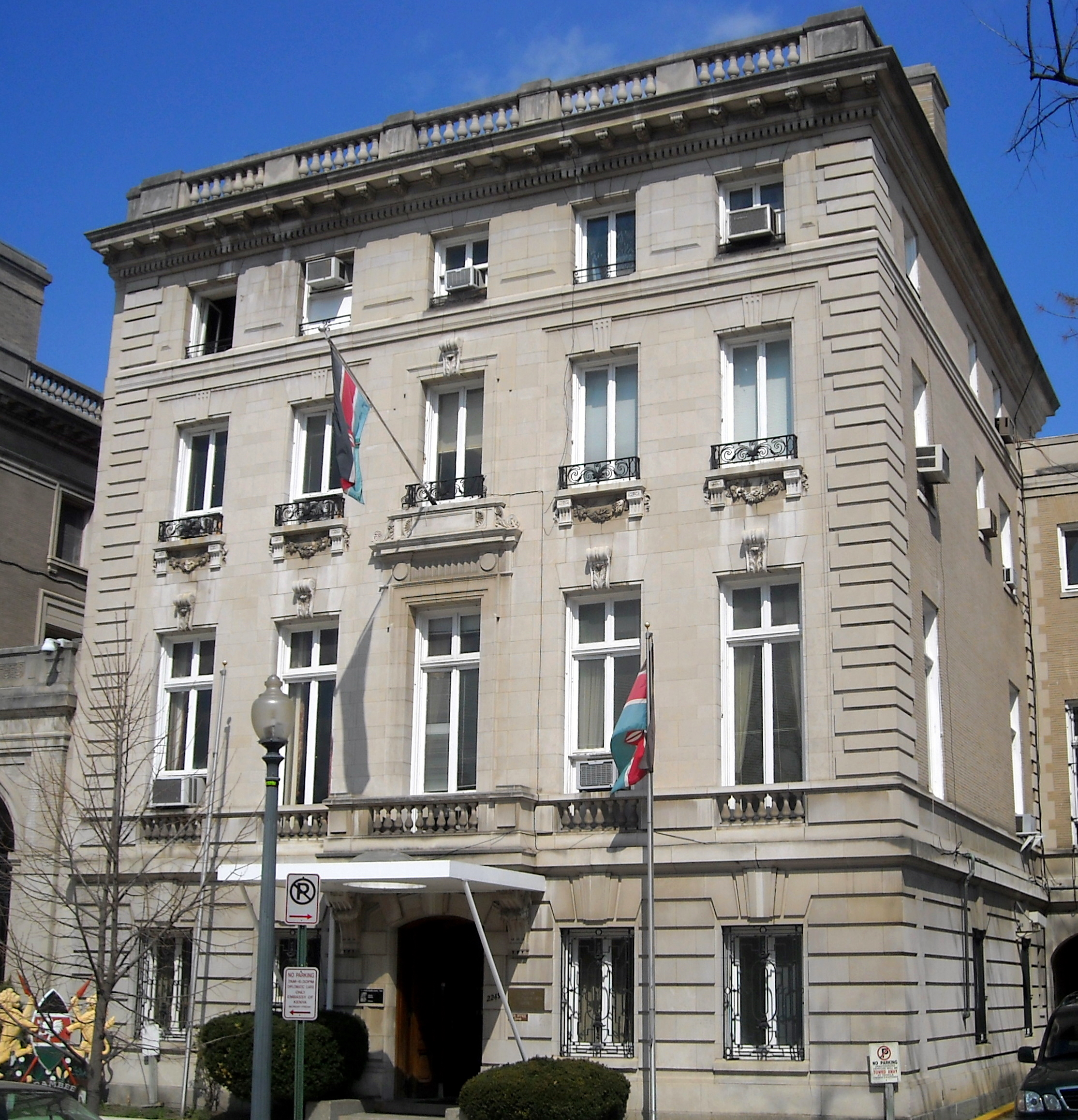
Kenyan embassy

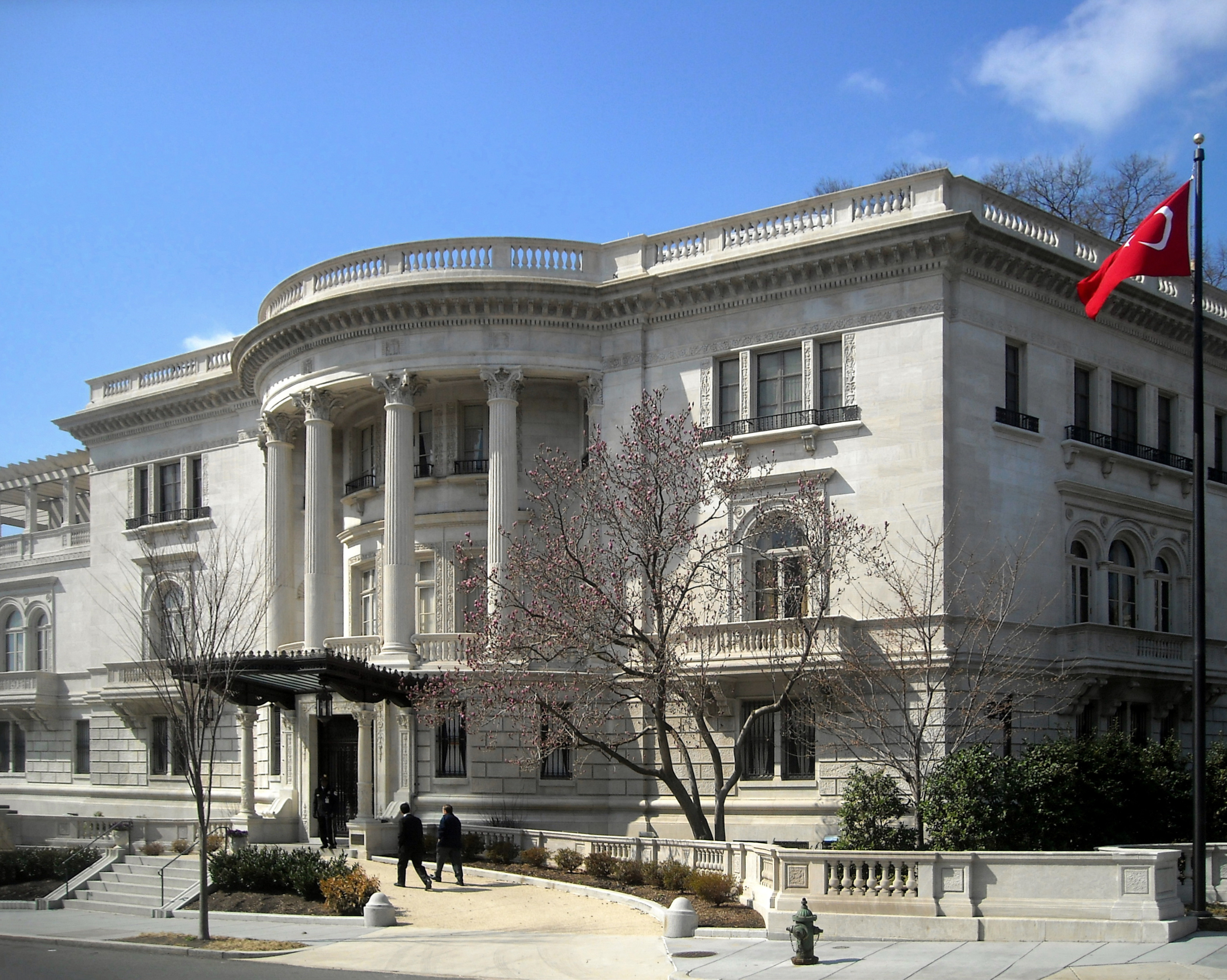
Turkish ambassadorial residence

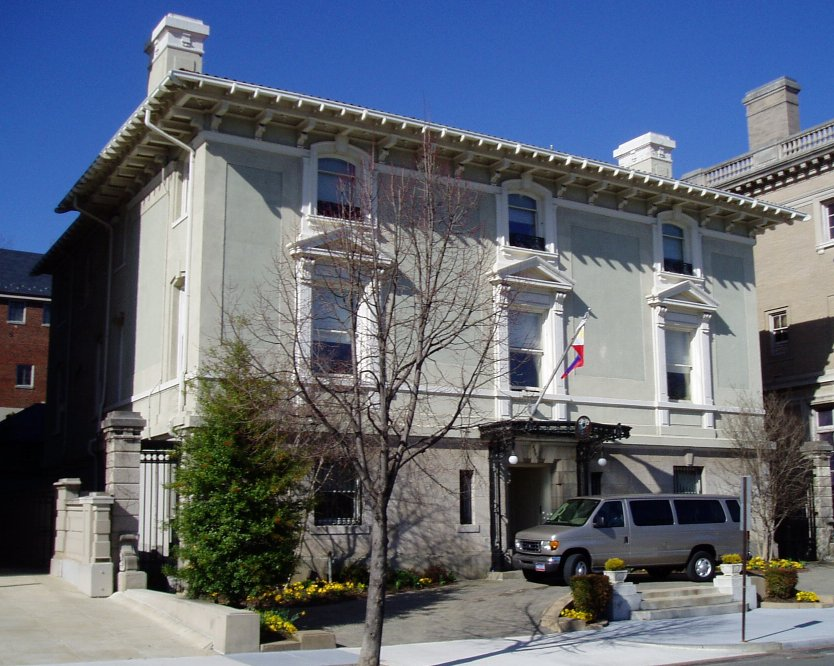
Filipino ambassadorial residence

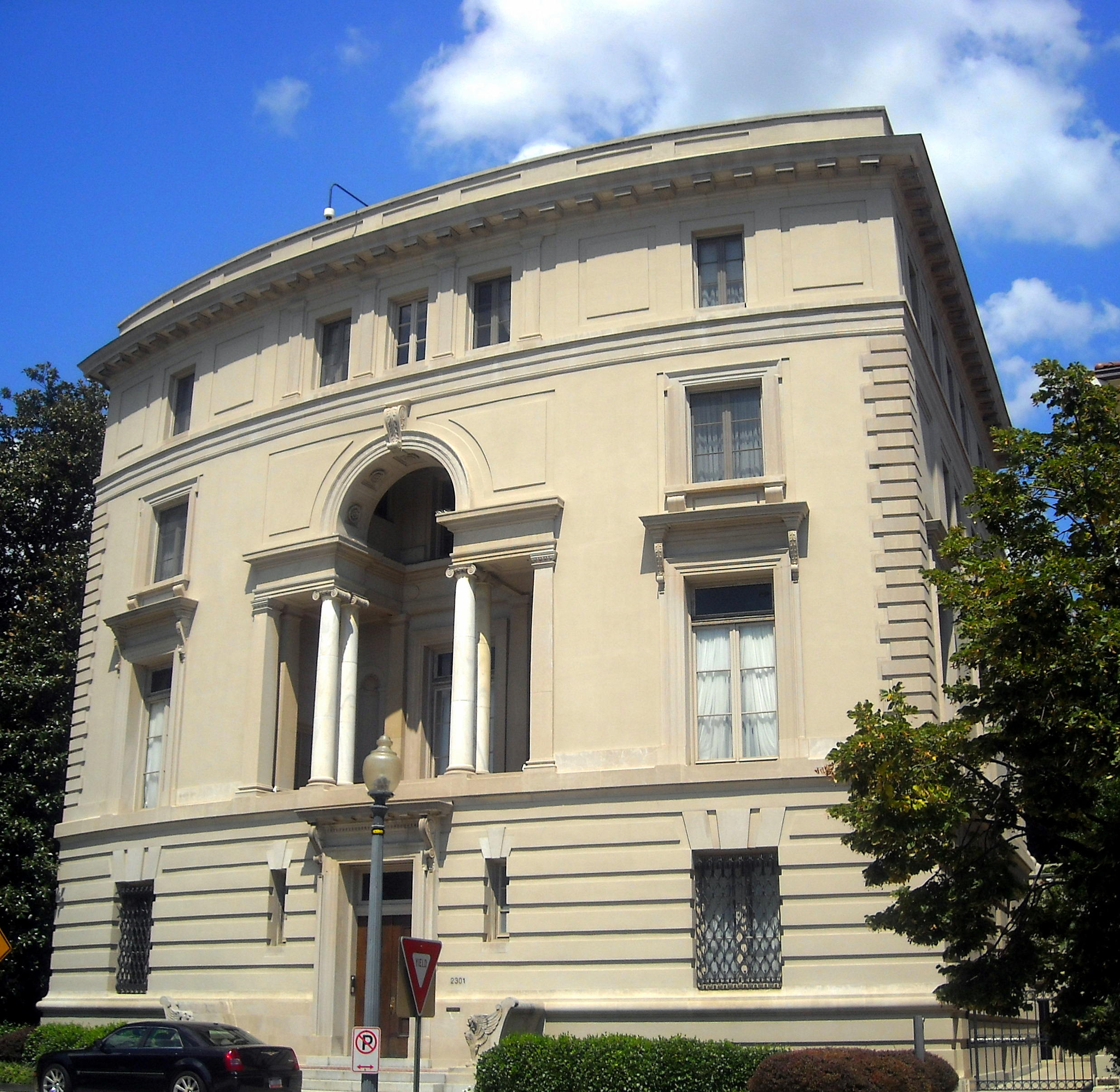
Joseph Beale House, now the Egyptian ambassadorial residence

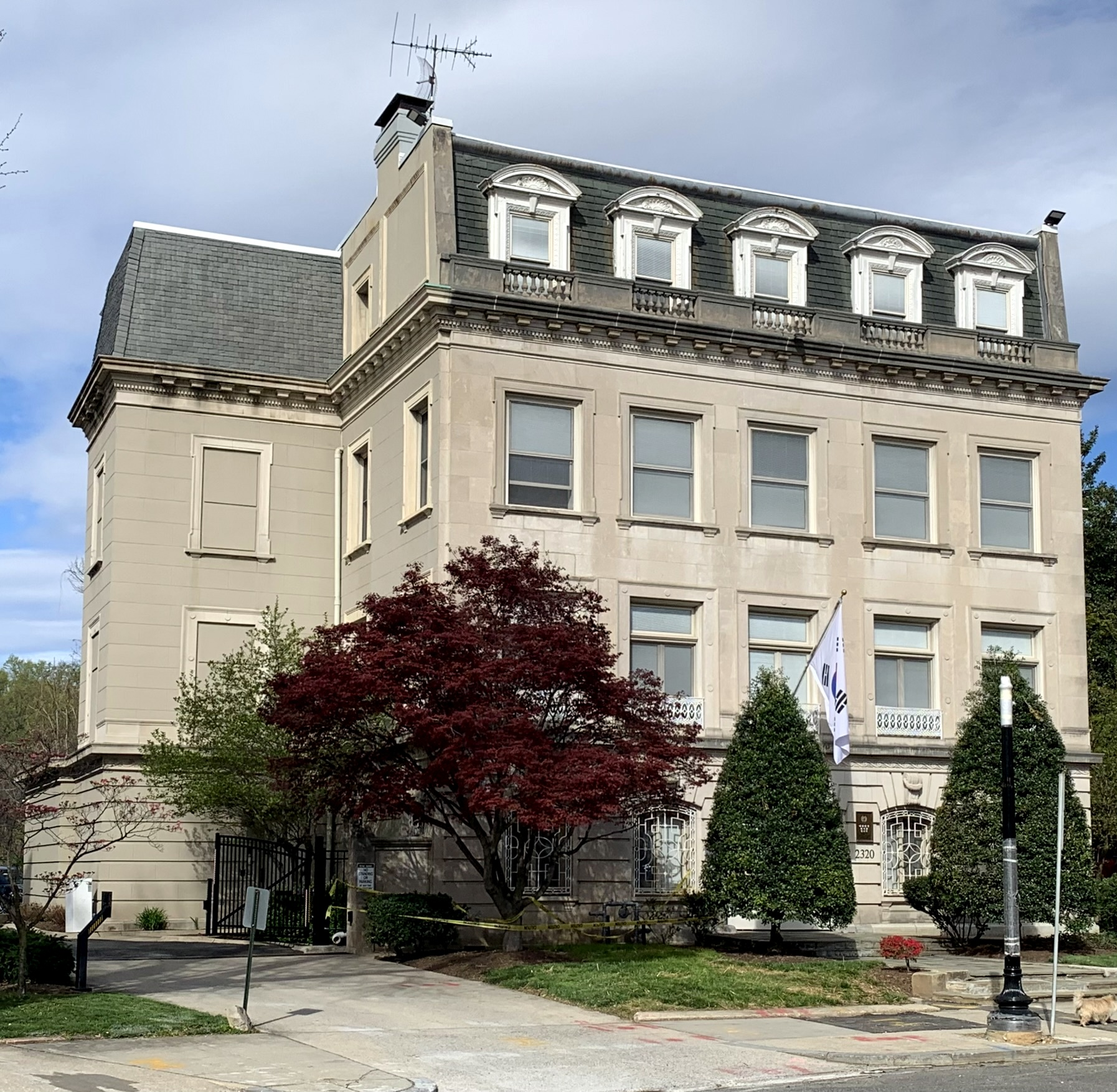
South Korean embassy's Consulate Section

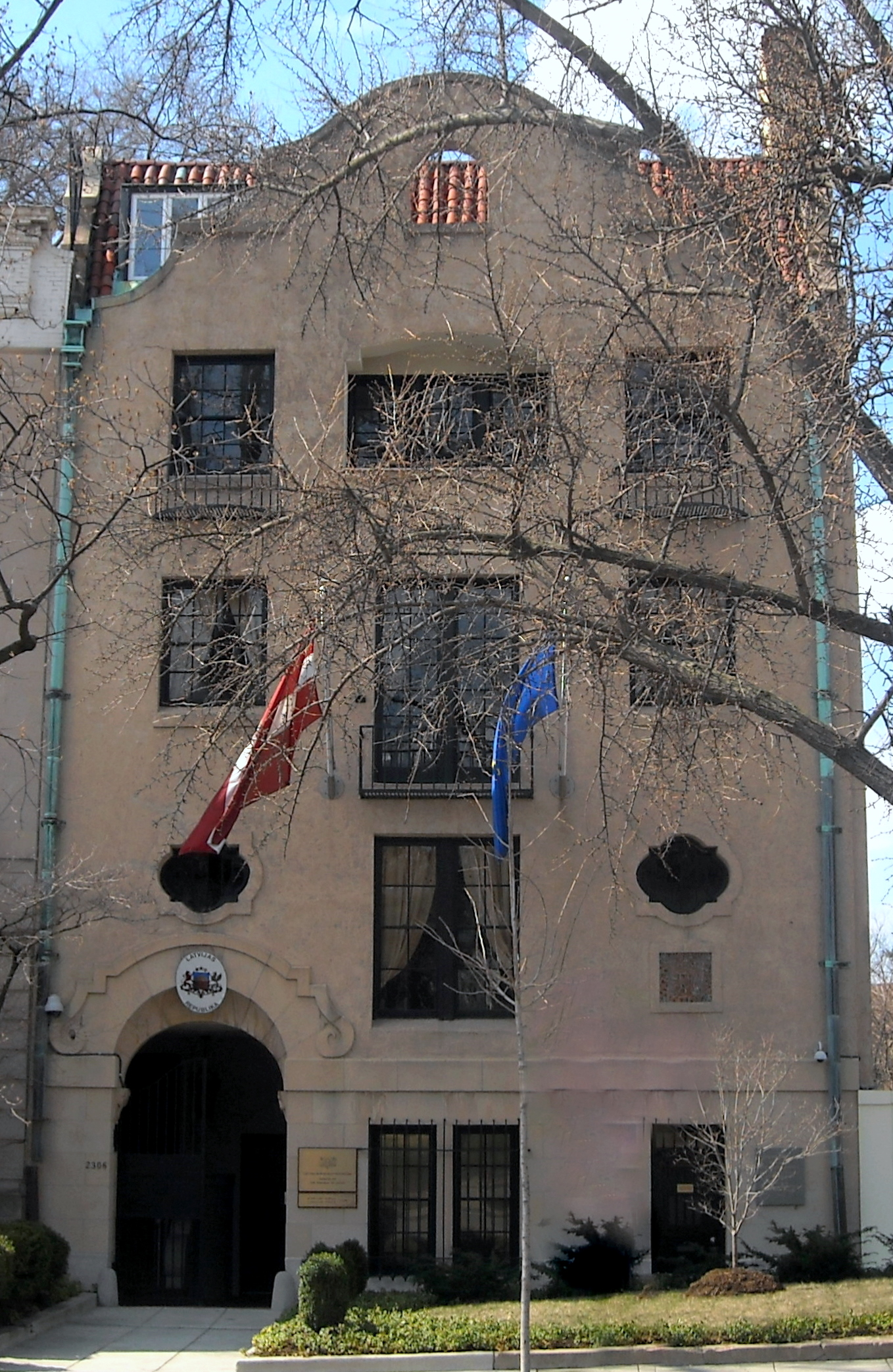
Alice Pike Barney Studio House, now the Latvian embassy

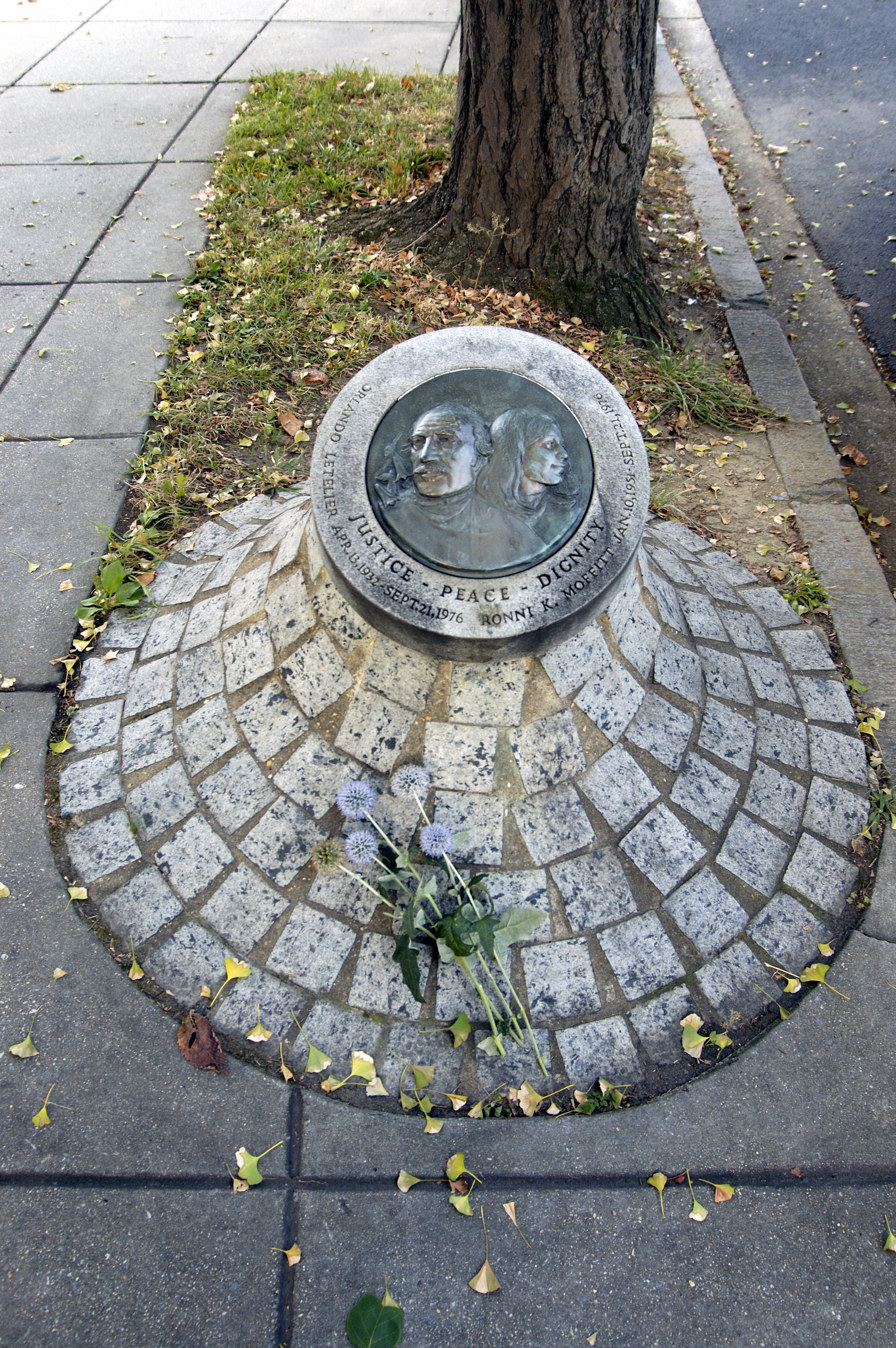
Memorial to the assassination of Orlando Letelier and Ronni Karpen Moffitt

== See also ==
- List of circles in Washington, D.C.
