= Southern Vermont College =

Private college near Bennington, Vermont, US (1926–2019)

- Type: Private college
- Active: 1926–2019; 7 years ago
- Location: Bennington, Vermont, United States
- Colors: Green and Gold
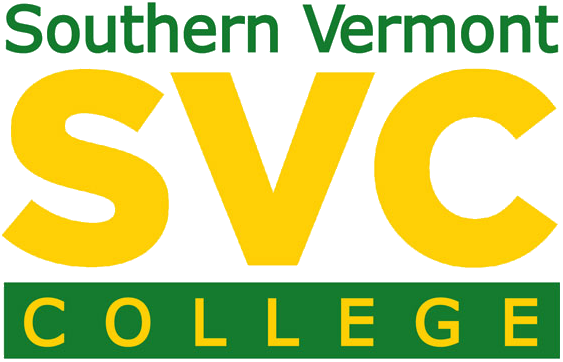
- The Orchards
- U.S. National Register of Historic Places
- U.S. Historic district
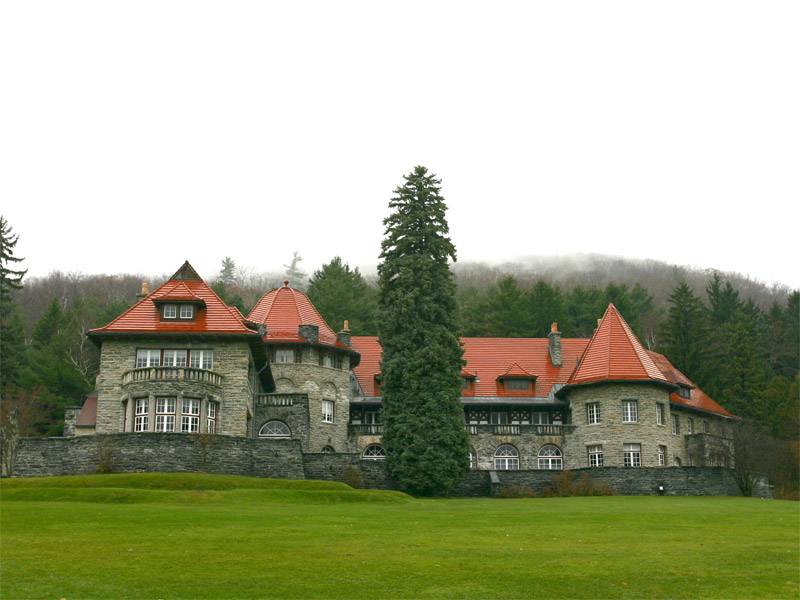
- Everett Mansion, 2004

- Location within Vermont Location within the United States
- Coordinates: 42°52′04″N 73°13′07″W
- Built: 1911
- Architect: George Oakley Totten Jr. Frank L. Wagner
- Architectural style: Eclectic Revival, Norman Revival
- NRHP reference No.: 00000384
- Added to NRHP: April 24, 2000

Southern Vermont College was a private college on the 371-acre (1.50 km^{2}) former Edward Everett Estate (originally The Orchards) near Bennington, Vermont, United States. The college closed in 2019.

== History ==
Southern Vermont College was founded in 1926 as St. Joseph Business School, an institution offering certificates of proficiency in secretarial accounting, finance, shorthand and typewriting. Eleven students were in the first graduating class. In 1962, it became an accredited junior college, St. Joseph College, awarding associate degrees in business and secretarial science.

Twelve years later, in 1974, the college moved to the Edward Hamlin Everett Estate and became Southern Vermont College, a nonsectarian college. In the years immediately following this change of location, the college earned bachelor's degree authority from the Vermont Department of Education and full accreditation with the New England Commission of Higher Education (NECHE).

In 2019, NECHE placed the college on "show-cause" status and asked the college to provide additional information about its financial stability to retain its accreditation. The college's only alternative was to lower the admission numbers of its incoming freshman class. This option would leave the school with a financial deficit. The college's president, David Rees Evans, announced the closure in March 2019, and the college closed after finishing the academic year in May 2019.

Academic records and transcripts are available upon request at the Massachusetts College of Liberal Arts in North Adams, Massachusetts.

== Campus ==
The 27-room Everett Mansion, listed (along with most of the campus) on the National Register of Historic Places, served as the college's primary administrative and academic building. It was built 1911–14 for Edward H. Everett, a successful businessman from Cleveland, Ohio, and is architecturally a distinctive combination of Beaux-Arts and Norman Revival styles. The architect, George Oakley Totten Jr., also designed Everett's Washington, DC residence, (formerly the Turkish embassy and now the Residence of the Ambassador of Turkey). It hosts the library, theatre, Center for Teaching and Learning (academic support), Burgdorff Gallery, eight classrooms, plus administrative offices. From 1977 to 1994, the theatre served as the residence for the regionally acclaimed Oldcastle Theatre Company.

The college had five residence halls, as well as a residence hall complex, Hunter Hall, that was completed in 2009 and accommodates 110 residential students. This residence hall, situated on the slopes of Mt. Anthony with views of the Green Mountains, is both a living and learning facility, with science and computer labs, study rooms, and an atrium overlooking a pond. Other buildings include the Dining Hall, Mountaineer Athletic Center with Fitness Center, and a 24-hour computer lab.

== Academics ==
Southern Vermont College offered 16 academic degree programs in five academic divisions: The McCormick Division of Business, The Hunter Division of Humanities, The Division of Nursing, The John Merck Division of Science and Technology, and The Donald Everett Axinn Division of Social Sciences.

It was a member of the Association of Vermont Independent Colleges (AVIC) and the Vermont Campus Compact, affiliated with the national association of colleges that include community service, hands-on learning and civic engagement as part of their academic requirements. All first-year students at Southern Vermont College took "Quest for Success," a course that combined classroom instruction with off-campus community projects in such fields as environmental restoration, research on historic objects in the local museum work with a local theater company, and media studies with Community Access Television.

In the fall of 2013, Southern Vermont College partnered with the College Steps Program, joining two other Vermont colleges engaged in this program aimed at supporting students with cognitive impairments (e.g., autism spectrum disorders, intellectual disabilities). It provided them with an opportunity to participate in a modified two-year college experience.

In January 2014, Southern Vermont College established the Veterans' Scholar Program (VSP). The program worked with veterans and military-connected family members.

== Athletics ==
SVC athletics logo

The Southern Vermont athletic teams were called the Mountaineers. The college was a member of the NCAA Division III ranks, primarily competing in the New England Collegiate Conference (NECC) from 2008–09 to 2018–19. The Mountaineers previously competed in the Great Northeast Athletic Conference (GNAC) from 1998–99 to 2007–08.

Southern Vermont competed in 13 intercollegiate varsity sports. Men's sports included baseball, basketball, cross country, soccer, track & field (outdoor) and volleyball; women's sports included basketball, cross country, lacrosse, soccer, softball, track & field (outdoor) and volleyball.

In the fall of 2012, the women's volleyball team won the NECC Championship for the third consecutive year.

In 2015, their Men's basketball team went undefeated in NECC regular season play before losing to Regis College in the NECC championship game 74-72. However, the Mountaineers came back with another undefeated regular season in 2016 and went on to win the NECC championship against Becker College.

== See also ==
- List of colleges and universities in the United States
- List of colleges and universities in Vermont
- National Register of Historic Places listings in Bennington County, Vermont
