= Aile Castle =

Castle in Vevey, Switzerland

- Château de l'Aile
- Vevey
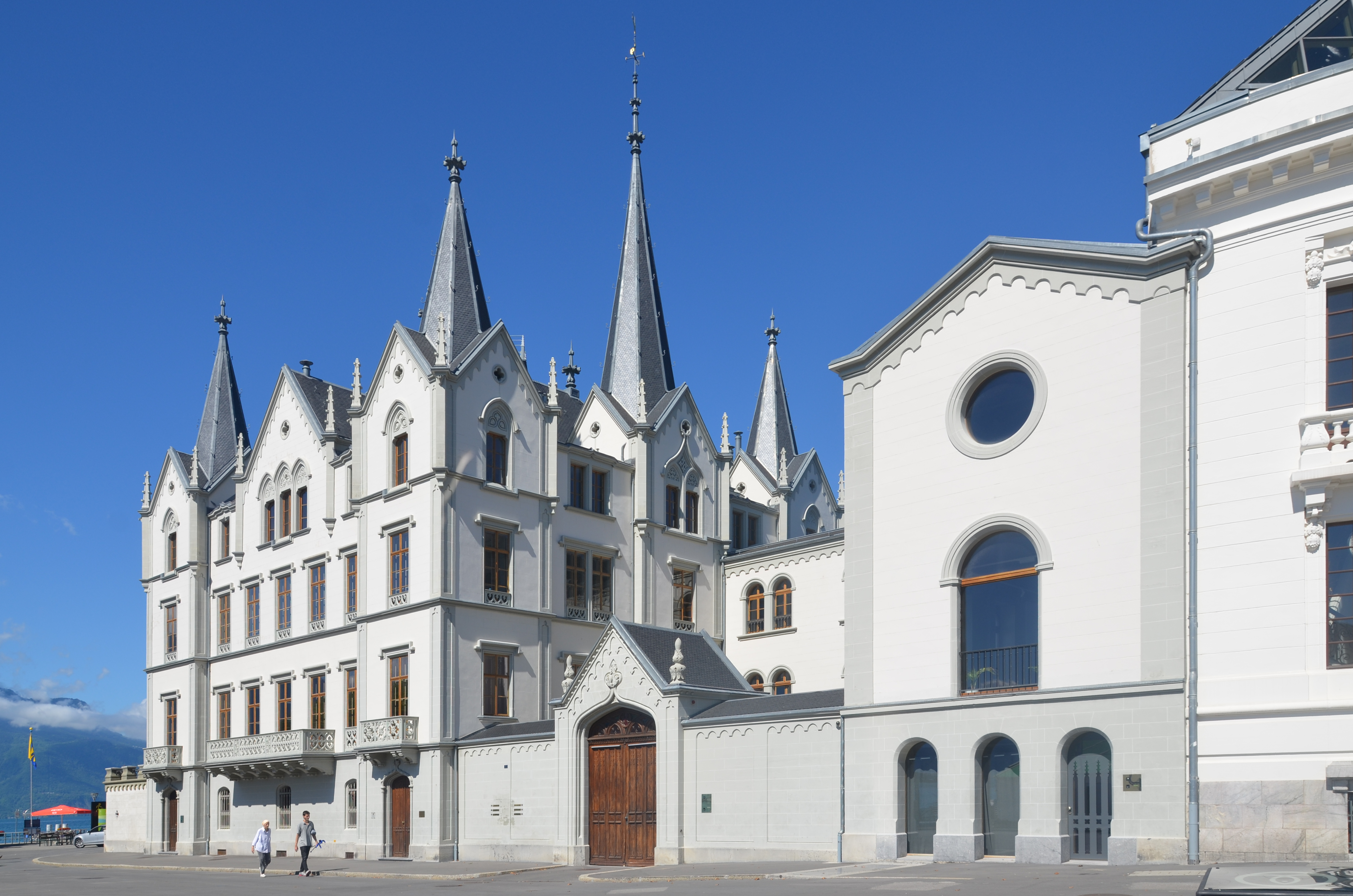
- Aile Castle in 2022

Location
- Coordinates: 46°27′33″N 6°50′27″E

Swiss Cultural Property of National Significance

Aile Castle is a castle in the municipality of Vevey of the Canton of Vaud in Switzerland. It is a Swiss heritage site of national significance.

== See also ==
- List of castles in Switzerland
- Château
