= Charlcote House =

Historic house in Maryland, United States

- U.S. National Register of Historic Places
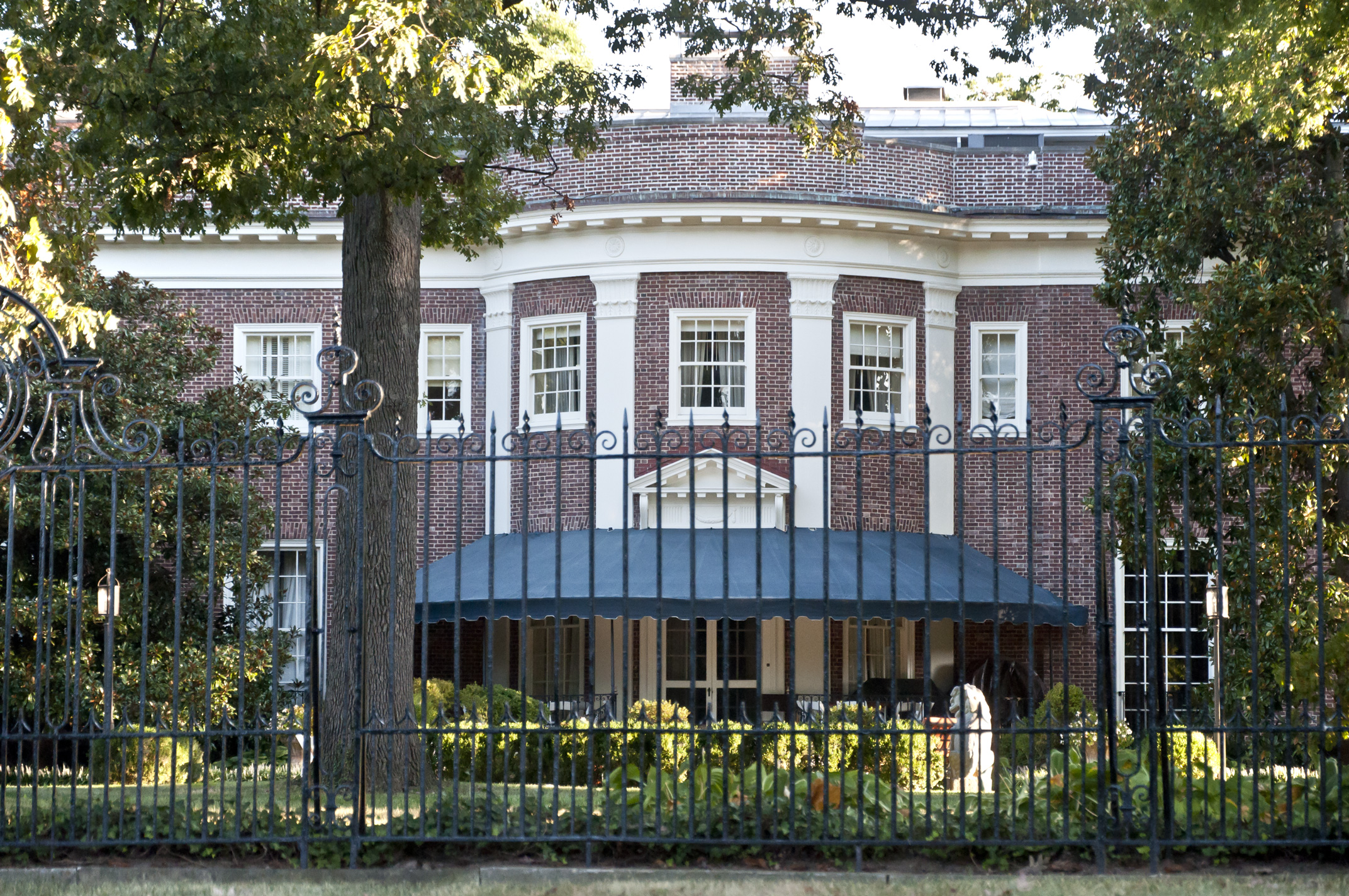

- Location within Baltimore Location within Maryland Location within the United States
- Location: 15 Charlcote Pl., Baltimore, Maryland
- Coordinates: 39°20′37″N 76°37′8″W
- Area: 2 acres (0.81 ha)
- Built: 1914
- Architect: Pope, John Russell; Cowan Building Co.
- Architectural style: Classical Revival
- NRHP reference No.: 88001858
- Added to NRHP: October 17, 1988

Charlcote House, also known as the James Swan Frick House, is a historic home located at Baltimore, Maryland, United States. It is a three-story brick, 16,409 sq ft (1,524.4 m^{2}) detached Classical Revival dwelling built about 1914–1916 in the Guilford development. It is one of the two identified domestic buildings in Maryland designed by John Russell Pope (the other is Woodend at Chevy Chase).

Charlcote House was listed on the National Register of Historic Places in 1988.
