= City Hall (Plattsburgh, New York) =

- Plattsburgh City Hall
- U.S. National Register of Historic Places
- New York State Register of Historic Places
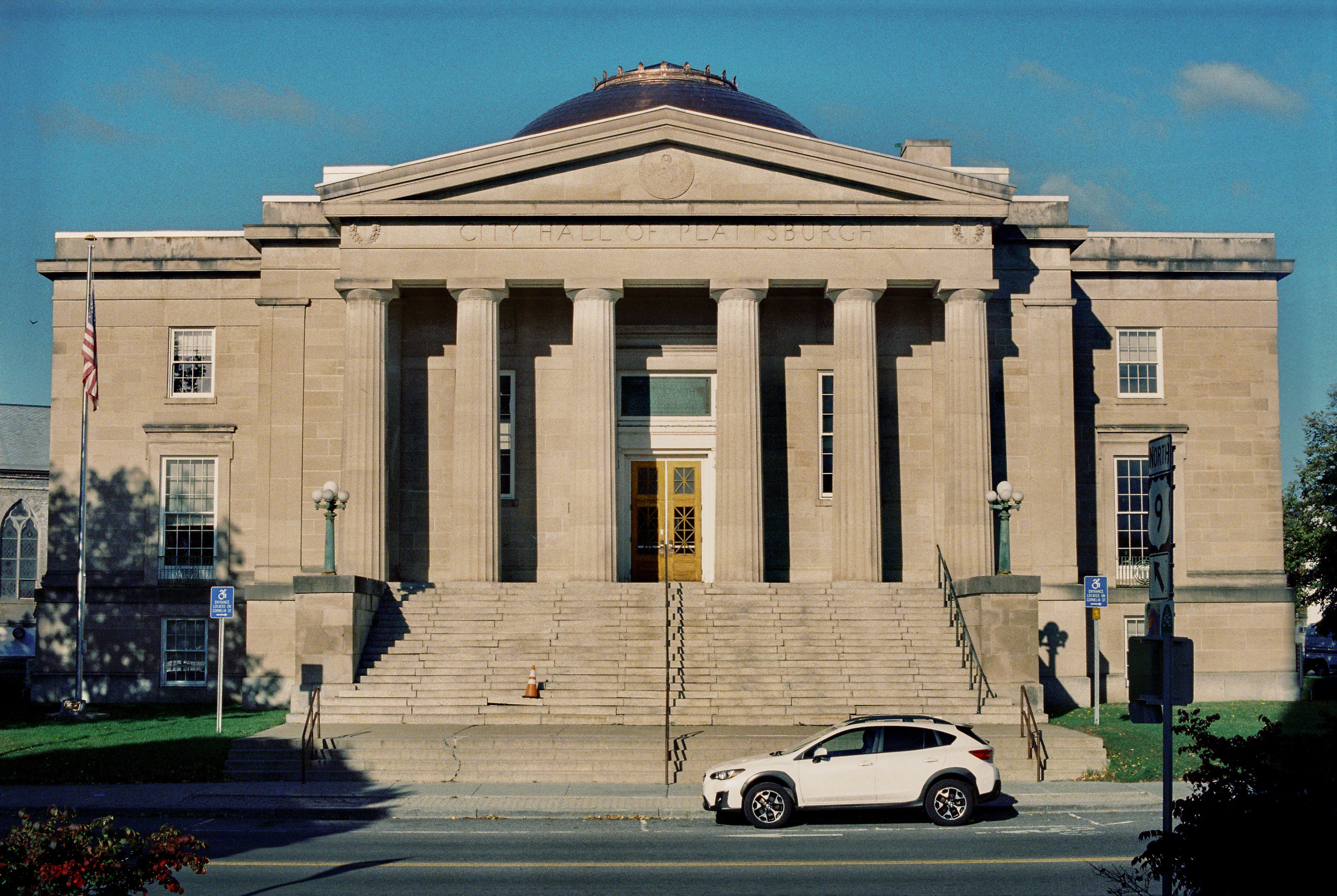
- Plattsburgh City Hall in 2024

- Location within New York Location within the United States
- Location: City Hall Pl., Plattsburgh, New York
- Coordinates: 44°41′57″N 73°27′9″W
- Area: less than one acre
- Built: 1917
- Architect: Pope, John Russell
- Architectural style: Classical Revival
- NRHP reference No.: 73001170
- NYSRHP No.: 01940.000016

Significant dates
- Added to NRHP: December 12, 1973
- Designated NYSRHP: June 23, 1980

Plattsburgh City Hall is an historic government building located at City Hall Place in Plattsburgh, Clinton County, New York. It was designed by architect John Russell Pope and constructed in 1917. It is a three-story, steel frame, limestone clad building in the Classical Revival style. It features a projecting entrance portico with six Doric order columns and a low central dome.

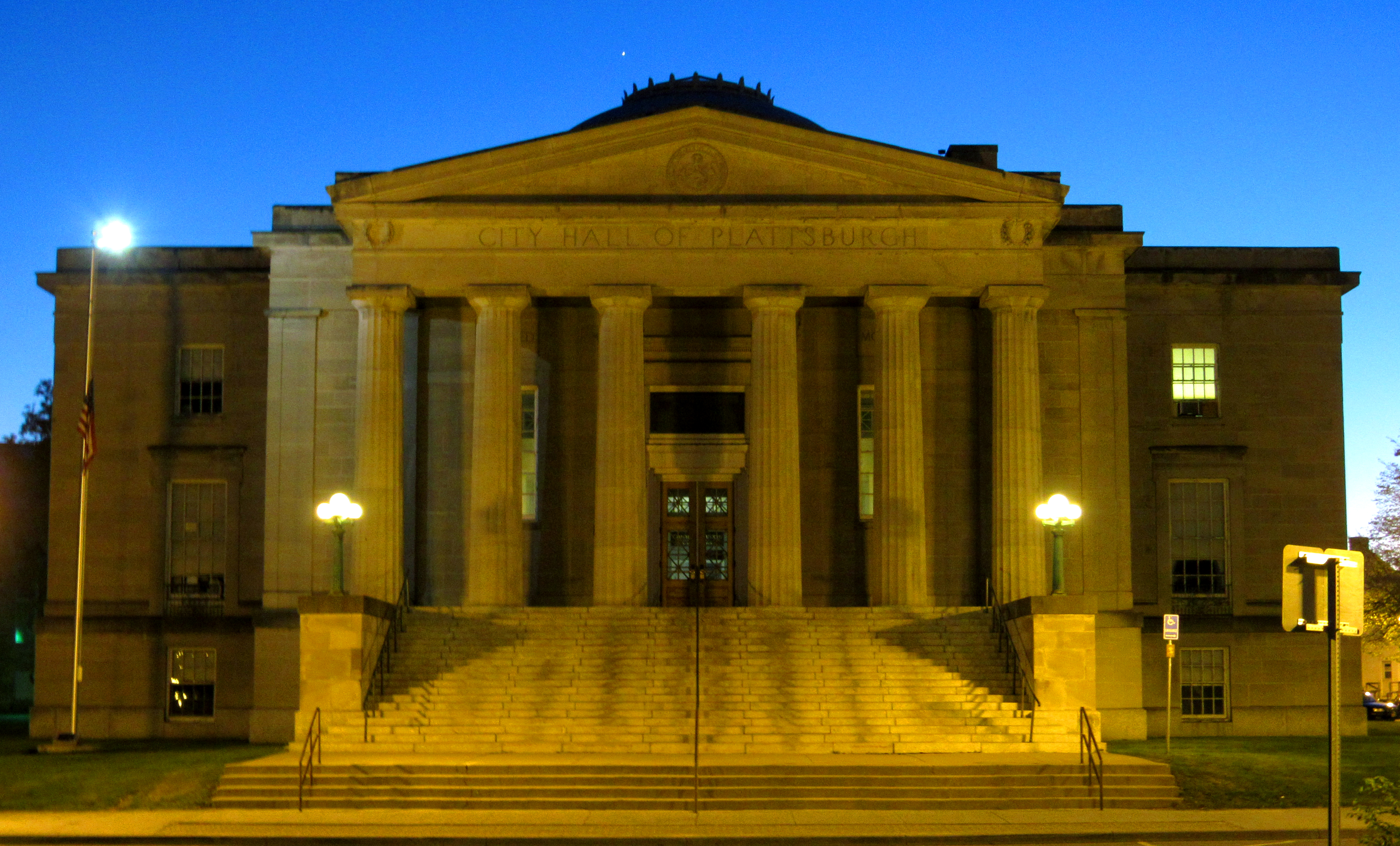
Plattsburgh City Hall in 2018

It was added to the National Register of Historic Places on December 12, 1973.

== See also ==
- List of Registered Historic Places in Clinton County, New York
