= Nature Forward =

US non-profit organization

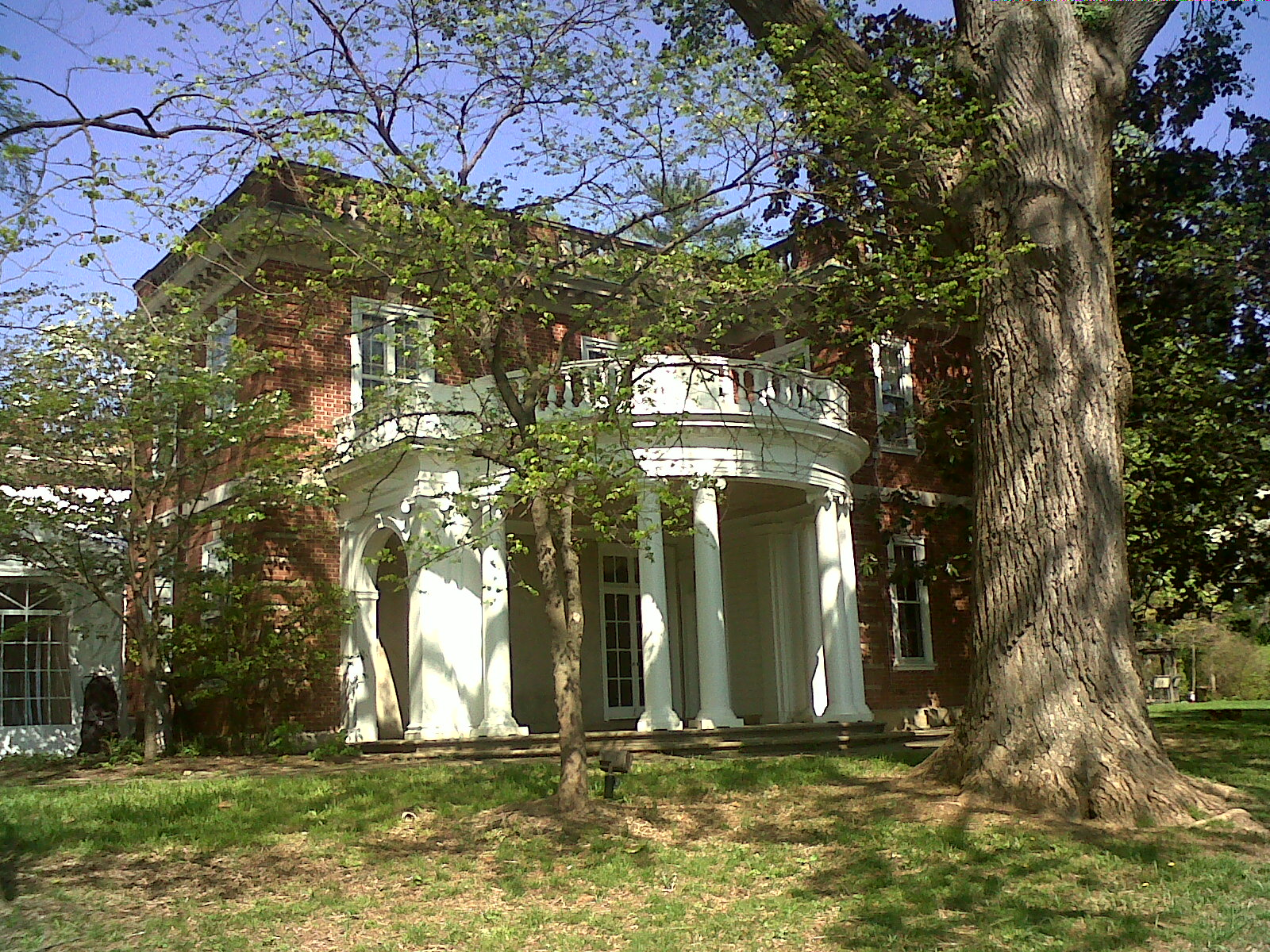
- Predecessor: Audubon Naturalist Society of the Central Atlantic States, Audubon Society of the District of Columbia
- Formation: 1897
- Type: Non-profit organization
- Purpose: Conservation, environmental education
- Headquarters: Woodend Sanctuary
- Location: Chevy Chase, Maryland
- Region served: Mid-Atlantic states
- Executive Director: Alison Pearce
- Website: natureforward.org

Nature Forward (formerly Audubon Naturalist Society of the Central Atlantic States, or Audubon Naturalist Society) is an American non-profit environmental organization dedicated to conservation and education. The organization holds two properties in the Washington, D.C. metropolitan area as wildlife sanctuaries, one in Virginia along with its headquarters in Maryland. Until 1959, the organization was known as the Audubon Society of the District of Columbia. In October 2022. the membership voted to change the name of the organization from Audubon Naturalist Society of the Central Atlantic States, choosing the new name Nature Forward.

== History ==
The first Audubon Society of the District of Columbia was organized in 1897 by Mrs. John Dewhurst Patten "for the protection and study of birds". It was one of many local groups organized in the late nineteenth and early twentieth centuries as part of the Audubon movement. Its first president was George M. Sternberg; the Executive Committee of fifteen members included Florence Augusta Merriam, Leland Ossian Howard, and Theodore Sherman Palmer. Robert Ridgway was named one of several honorary vice presidents, and designed a pin for the society. Olive Thorne Miller wrote one of the group's earliest leaflets. In the Society's first year, it printed and circulated a leaflet published by its counterpart organization in New York.

Early goals of the organization were to educate children about the value of birds and to curtail the use of bird feathers in millinery. Frank M. Chapman gave the inaugural lecture, "Woman as Bird Enemy", addressing the fashion for trimming hat with feathers. However, most of the active members of the early Society were women.

Theodore Roosevelt was an active member of the Society; during his presidency the organization occasionally met at the White House.

Sternberg was succeeded as president of the organization by Judge Barnard of the Supreme Court of the District; following Barnard's death in 1923, Palmer served as president.

In the years following World War II, Irston Barnes (president 1946–1962), Roger Tory Peterson, and Louis Halle rejuvenated the organization and strengthened its voice on regional conservation issues. The Society was incorporated in 1947, and new by-laws replaced the Executive Committee with an annually elected Board of Directors. Board members during this period included Paul Bartsch, William Vogt, and in the 1950s, Howard Zahniser. Rachel Carson served on the board from 1948 to 1950, and from 1955; she chaired the publications committee and wrote book reviews and other pieces for the society's Wood Thrush (later, Atlantic Naturalist).

In December 1959, the organization adopted the name Audubon Naturalist Society of the Central Atlantic States, Inc. (ANS).

In 1969, the society moved to its present headquarters at Woodend Sanctuary, a bequest of Mrs. Chester Wells; the property comprises 40 acres in Chevy Chase, Maryland, and a 30-room mansion. In October 2022, the membership voted to change the name to Nature Forward.

=== C&O Canal controversy ===
The Chesapeake and Ohio Canal was acquired by the federal government in 1938 as settlement of a debt. Maintaining the canal was thought to be too expensive, and soon plans were in place to convert all or part of the corridor to a parkway. However, in 1953, opposition to the parkway began to mount. The Society and its president Barnes joined the dissent; Barnes wrote an influential article for the Washington Post, arguing for restoring the canal and converting its towpath to a hiking trail. He chaired the newly formed Potomac Valley Conservation and Recreation Council to promote conservation in the valley and oppose the road project, which was ultimately shelved.

== Programs ==
Although its original focus was birds, Nature Forward has been active in several areas of wildlife conservation, protection of habitat, and control of pollution. Past conservation activities include successful efforts to block road construction through Rock Creek and Glover-Archbold Parks. The Society has also been active in preserving Dyke Marsh and working to protect golden and bald eagles. In 2007, the Society opposed construction of Maryland Route 200 (often known as the Intercounty Connector), bringing an unsuccessful suit in federal court against the project. In 2013, the society joined opposition to development in the watershed of Ten Mile Creek.

=== Sanctuaries ===
Nature Forward manages two properties as wildlife sanctuaries: the headquarters property of Woodend and the 68-acre Rust Nature Sanctuary in Leesburg, Virginia. In fiscal year 2013, the organization entered into a partnership with the Northern Virginia Regional Park Authority (NOVA Parks) for the operation of Rust Sanctuary: NOVA Parks will maintain the buildings and grounds and the society will continue to offer educational programming at the site. In addition to trails and classrooms, the Woodend facility provides a shop offering books, sport optics, birdfeeding supplies, gifts, and items for children.

=== Education ===
Nature Forward offers a range of summer camps and other activities for children and families, as well as outreach programs to local schools and training for teachers. For adults, the organization offers classes and workshops, training in stream water quality monitoring, local field trips, nature travel to locations like Costa Rica, and a certificate program in Natural History Field Studies (formerly co-sponsored by Graduate School USA).

=== Publications ===
The Society's current publication is Naturalist Quarterly.

In 1948, Shirley Briggs became the first editor of the society's Wood Thrush. The periodical was soon renamed Atlantic Naturalist, and it appeared under that name from 1950 to 1976. Atlantic Naturalist published work by some of the country's leading nature writers, conservationists, and naturalists, among them Carson, Peterson, Halle, Zahniser, Stewart Udall, William O. Douglas, and Chandler Robbins. It was succeeded by the Audubon Naturalist News. By 2009, the News was on a quarterly publication schedule. With the Spring 2011 issue (volume 37, number 2), it was renamed Naturalist Quarterly, incorporating the Society's catalog of environmental educational programs into its coverage of Nature Forward people and events and local conservation activities.

=== Awards ===
From time to time, the organization grants the Paul Bartsch Award for distinguished contributions to natural history. The award honors mid-Atlantic resident Bartsch, curator for the Smithsonian Institution, society board member, and frequent contributor to Atlantic Naturalist. Past recipients include Carson (1963), Peterson, Robbins, Briggs (1972), Alexander Wetmore (1964), David Brower (1967), Claudia Wilds, Clarence Cottam, Donald Messersmith (2002), and Lawrence Zeleny.

== Disavowing Audubon name ==
In the 2020s reappraisal of figures involved with slavery, the organization announced in October 2021 that it would change its name to remove the reference to John James Audubon, who owned slaves, opposed the abolition of slavery, and wrote about the inferiority of Black and Indigenous people. The organization sought a name "that better reflects the growing, rich diversity of the region that we serve," looking "forward toward a stronger, more inclusive future." In October 2022. membership voted to change the name of the organization to Nature Forward.

== Similar organizations ==
The present DC Bird Alliance, formerly the Audubon Society of the District of Columbia (DC Audubon), established in 1999, is a local chapter of the National Audubon Society. Under the name Audubon Naturalist Society, Nature Forward was not directly affiliated with the national organization.

The National Audubon Society also maintains a public policy office in Washington, D.C., as well as other local chapters around the metropolitan area.

== Bibliography ==
- Audubon Naturalist Society (2013). "Annual Report: A Year in Review from April 1, 2012 to March 31, 2013" (PDF). Archived from the original (PDF) on 2014-07-01.
- Audubon Naturalist Society (2014). "Naturalist Quarterly". Archived from the original on 13 August 2014.
- Fitzpatrick, Neal (Spring 2011). "From the Director" (PDF). Naturalist News. 37 (2). Chevy Chase, MD: Audubon Naturalist Society: 3. Archived from the original (PDF) on 23 September 2015.
- Lear, Linda (1997). Rachel Carson: Witness for Nature. New York, NY: Henry Holt and Company. ISBN 0-8050-3427-7.
- Mackintosh, Barry (Summer 1995). "Shootout on the Old C. & O. Canal: The Great Parkway Controversy, 1950–1960" (PDF). Maryland Historical Magazine. 90 (2). Baltimore, MD: Maryland Historical Society: 3.
- Mason, Karen (2014). "Shirley A. Briggs Papers". Iowa City, IA: Iowa Women's Archives, The University of Iowa.
- Maynard, Lucy Warner (1935). "The Audubon Society of the District of Columbia". Records of the Columbia Historical Society, Washington, D.C. 35/36. Historical Society of Washington, D.C.: 98–108. JSTOR 40067510.
- McEwan, Peggy (29 January 2014). "Registration opens for Audubon Naturalist Society summer camps". Gazette.Net. Gaithersburg, MD: Post Community Media, LLC. Archived from the original on 12 August 2014.
- Minichiello, J. Kent; White, Anthony W., eds. (1997). From Blue Ridge to Barrier Islands: An Audubon Naturalist Reader. Baltimore, MD: The Johns Hopkins University Press. ISBN 0-8018-6531-X.
- Peck, Louis (5 June 2013). "The Battle Of Ten Mile Creek Intensifies". Bethesda Magazine. Bethesda, MD: Bethesda Magazine.
- Smithsonian Institution Archives (11 July 2011). "Record Unit 7294, Audubon Naturalist Society of the Central Atlantic States, Records". Smithsonian Institution.
