= John Russell Pope =

American architect (1874–1937)

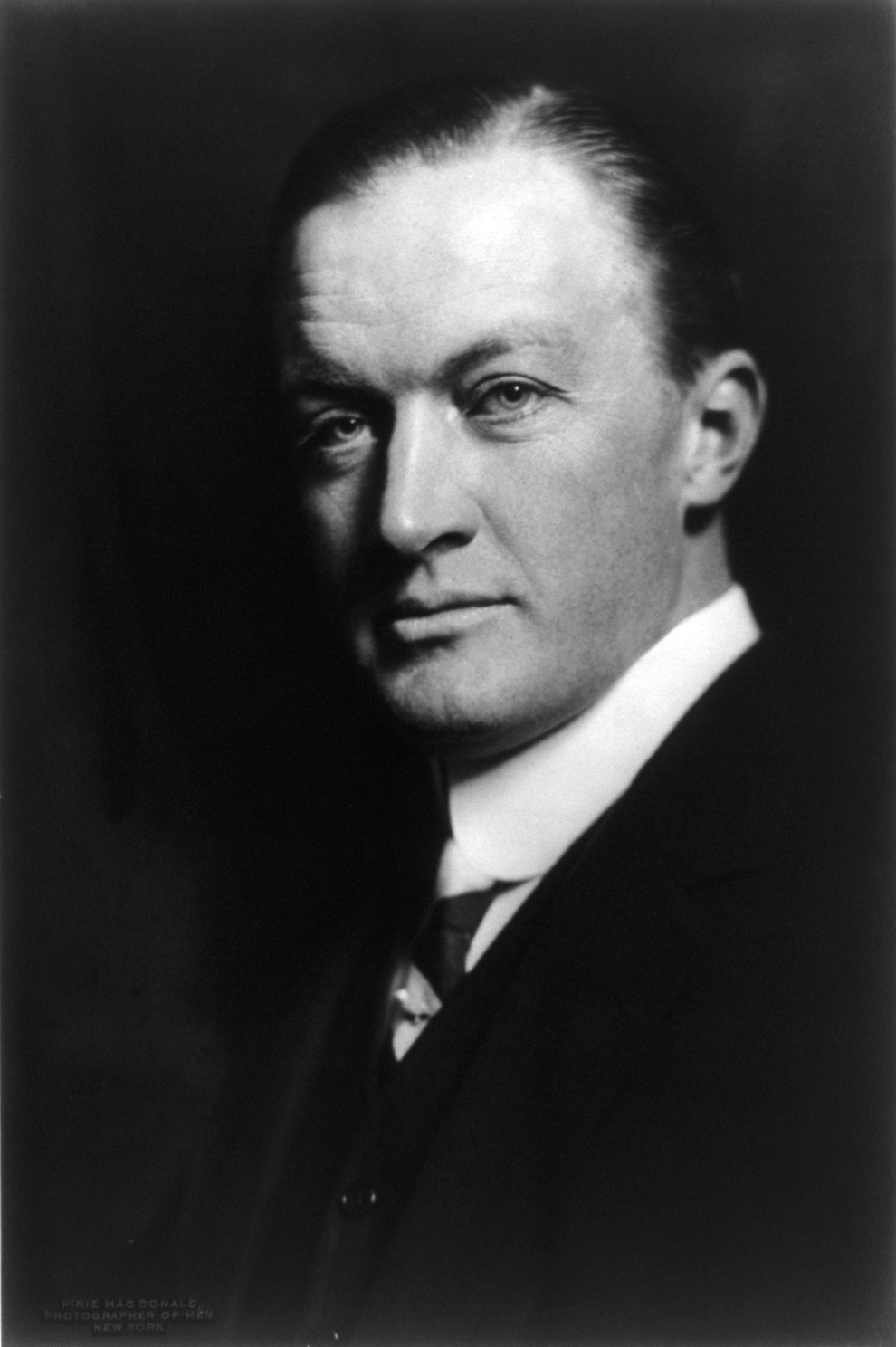
- Pope in 1911
- Born: April 24, 1874; New York City, U.S.
- Died: August 27, 1937 (aged 63); New York City, U.S.
- Education: Columbia University; École des Beaux-Arts
- Occupation: Architect
- Spouse: Sadie Jones
- Children: Mary and Jane Pope
- Parent(s): John Pope, Mary Avery Loomis Pope

Medal record

Art competitions

Representing the United States

Olympic Games
Silver medal – second place	1932 Los Angeles	Architectural design

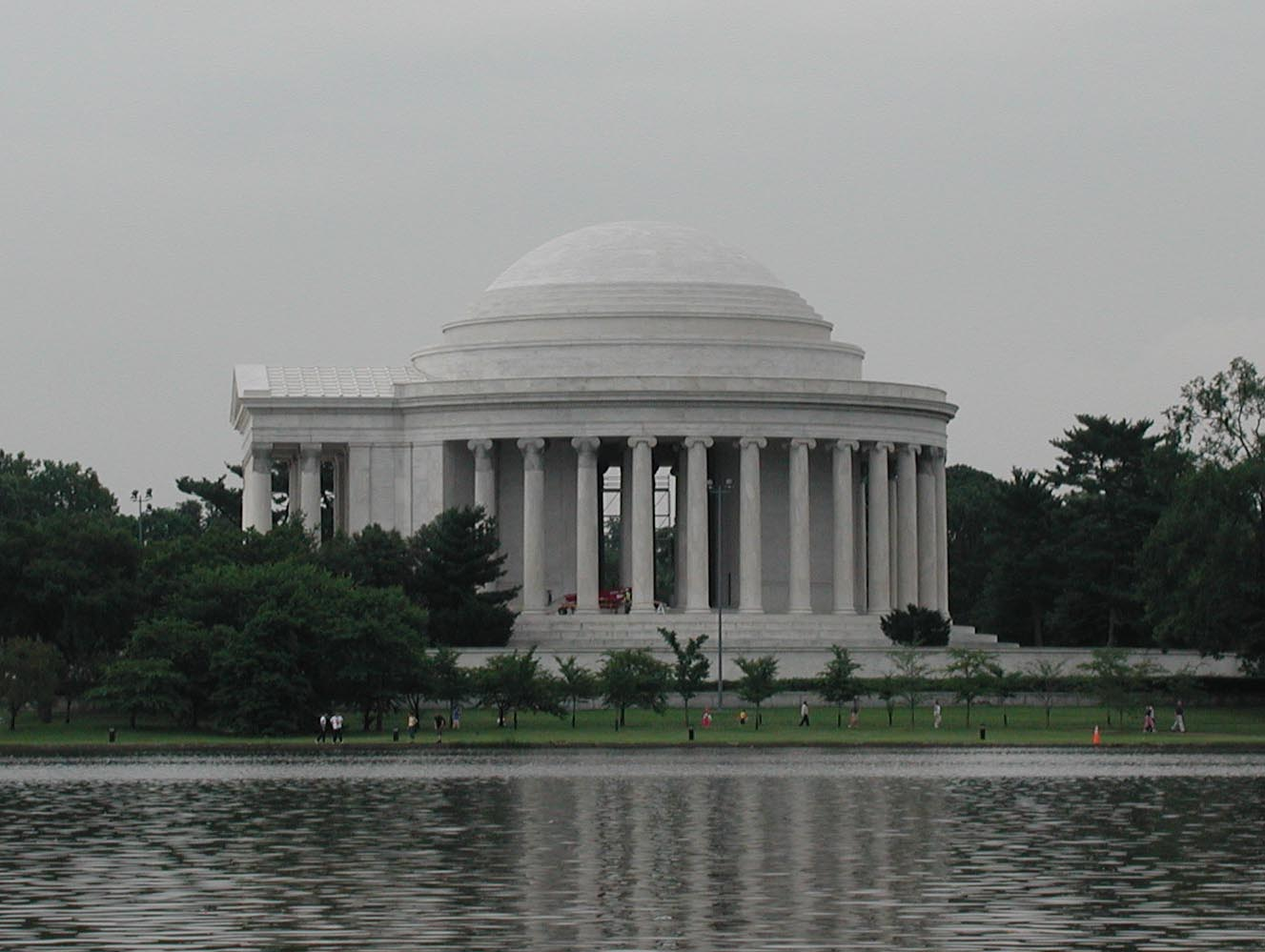
The Jefferson Memorial, a memorial to Thomas Jefferson built between 1939 and 1943

John Russell Pope (April 24, 1874 – August 27, 1937) was an American architect whose firm is widely known for designing major public buildings, including the National Archives and Records Administration building (completed in 1935), the Jefferson Memorial (completed in 1943) and the West Building of the National Gallery of Art (completed in 1941), all in Washington, D.C.

== Early life and education ==
Pope was born in New York City, on April 24, 1874, the son of a successful portrait painter and his wife. He studied architecture at Columbia University, where he graduated in 1894. He was the first recipient of the Rome Prize to attend the newly founded American Academy in Rome, a training ground for the designers of the American Renaissance. He would remain involved with the academy until his death.

Pope traveled for two years through Italy and Greece, where he studied, sketched and made measured drawings of more Romanesque, Gothic, and Renaissance structures than he did of the remains of ancient buildings. Pope was one of the first architectural students to master the use of the large-format camera, with glass negatives. Pope attended the École des Beaux-Arts in Paris in 1896, honing his Beaux-Arts style.

== Career ==
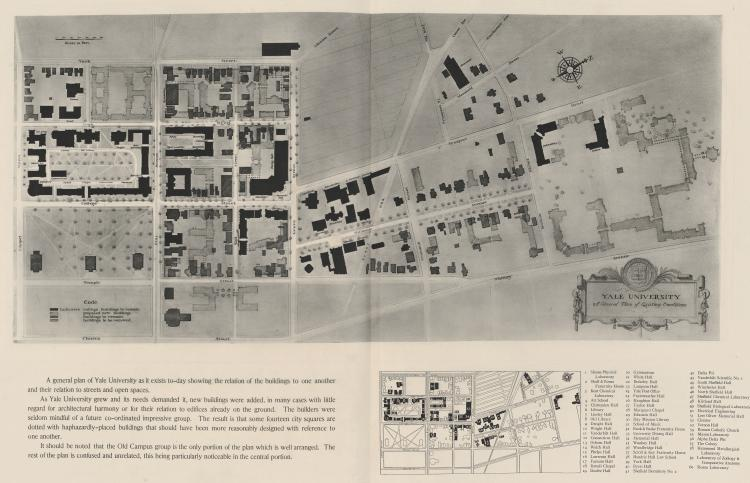
Pope's overall plan for the building of the Yale University campus in 1919

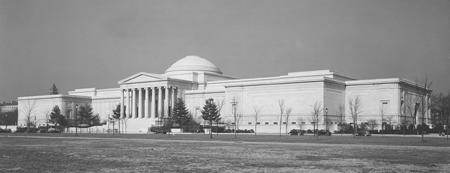
The West Building of the National Gallery of Art

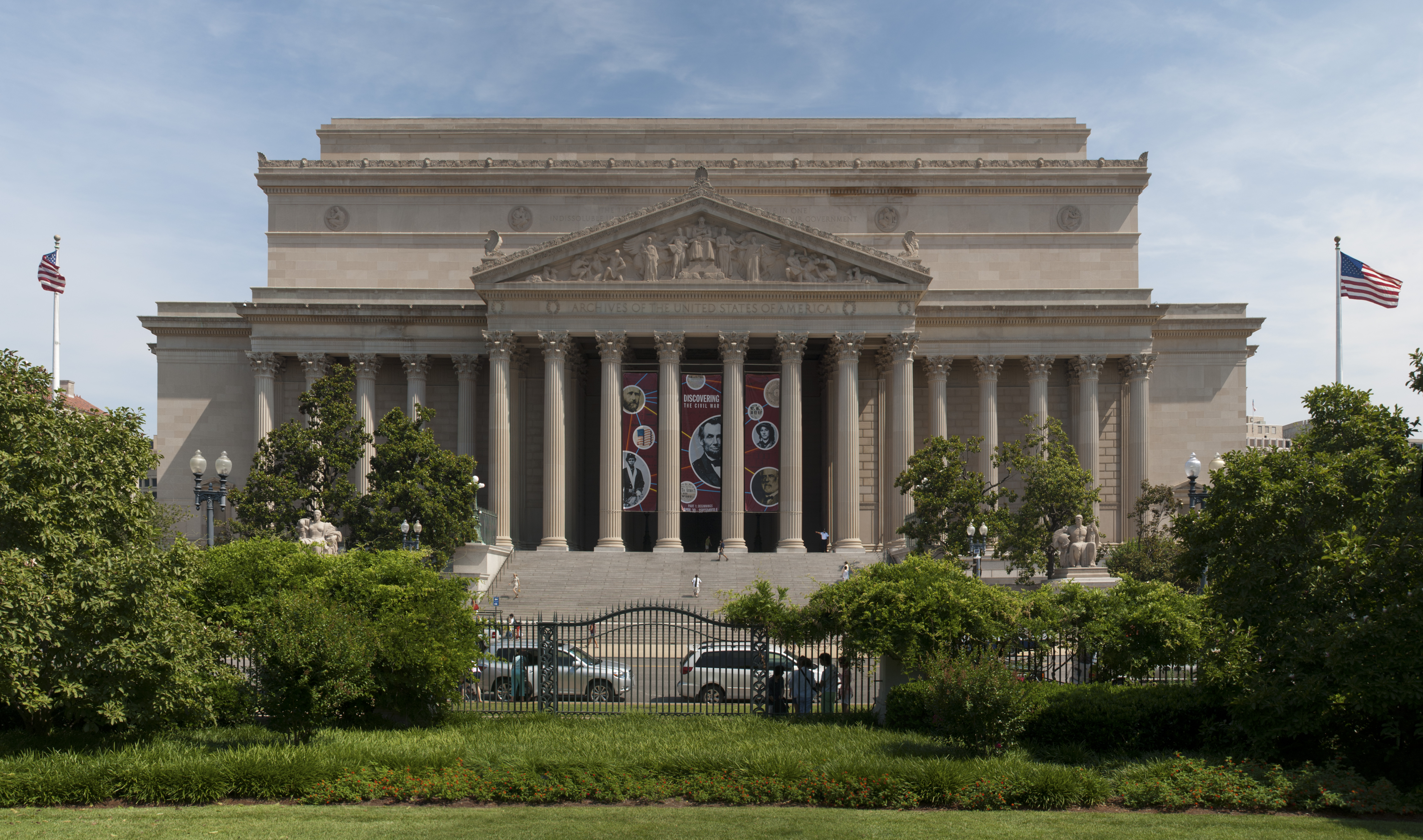
The National Archives in Washington D.C., James Earle Fraser, sculptor; opened 1935

In 1900, after returning to New York City, Pope worked for a few years in the office of Bruce Price before opening his own practice.

Pope designed private houses, such as The Waves, his personal residence in Newport, Rhode Island, and public buildings in addition to the Jefferson Memorial, the National Gallery of Art, the Masonic House of the Temple, all in Washington, D.C., and the triumphal arch Theodore Roosevelt Memorial (1936) at the American Museum of Natural History in New York City.

He designed the extension of the Henry Clay Frick mansion in New York City that created the Garden Court and music room, among other features, as the house was expanded to be operated as a museum.

In 1912, he submitted several proposals for the Lincoln Memorial, but lost out to Henry Bacon.

In 1919, he developed a master plan for the future growth of Yale University. Pope's plan for Yale was significantly revised by James Gamble Rogers in 1921, who had more sympathy for the requirements of the city of New Haven, Connecticut. Rogers did keep the Collegiate Gothic unifying theme offered by Pope. Pope's original plan is a prime document in the City Beautiful movement in city planning.

His firm's designs alternated between revivals of Gothic, Georgian, eighteenth-century French, and classical styles. Pope designed the Henry E. Huntington mausoleum on the grounds of The Huntington Library in southern California. He later used the design as a prototype for the Jefferson Memorial in Washington, D.C. The Jefferson Memorial and the National Gallery of Art were both neoclassical, modeled by Pope on the Roman Pantheon.

Lesser known projects by Pope's firm include Union Station, Richmond, Virginia (1917), with a central rotunda capped with a low saucer dome; it now houses the Science Museum of Virginia, the Branch House (1916–1919), a Tudor-style mansion in Richmond, now housing The Branch Museum of Design; the Baltimore Museum of Art; and in Washington, D.C., the National City Christian Church, DAR Constitution Hall, American Pharmacists Association Building, Ward Homestead, and the National Archives Building (illustration, left).

In 1917, he designed the City Hall (Plattsburgh, New York), which was completed in 1917, and the city's Macdonough Monument, erected in 1926 to commemorate the naval victory of Commodore Macdonough in the Battle of Plattsburgh on September 11, 1814.

Pope designed additions to the Tate Gallery and British Museum in London, an unusual honor for an American architect, and the War Memorial at Montfaucon-d'Argonne, France. Pope also designed extensive alterations to Belcourt, the Newport residence of Oliver and Alva Belmont. The Georgian Revival residence he built in 1919 for Thomas H. Frothingham in Far Hills, New Jersey has been adapted as the United States Golf Association Museum.

Pope was a member of the United States Commission of Fine Arts in Washington, D.C. from 1912 to 1922, serving as vice chairman from 1921 to 1922. He also served on the Board of Architectural Consultants for the Federal Triangle complex in Washington, D.C. During the 1920s, the firm designed a number of well known country estates including Spring Hill Farms, later renamed Cobble Court.

In East Aurora, New York, Pope designed a summer estate for Frank H. Goodyear Jr, son of Frank H. Goodyear and his wife, Dorothy Knox (daughter of Seymour H. Knox). That estate was subsequently split apart and the main house is now owned by Jeremy Jacobs while the stables and water tower make up Crag Burn Club, a private golf club with a course designed by Robert Trent Jones.

In Milwaukee, Wisconsin, he designed a severe neo-Georgian clubhouse for the University Club (1926). In Oneonta, New York, he designed the first building for Hartwick College, Bresee Hall, which was constructed in 1928.

In 1932, he constructed the chapter house for Alpha Delta Phi at Cornell University in Ithaca, New York.

Pope won a Silver Medal in the 1932 Summer Olympics for his design of the Payne Whitney Gymnasium.

== Death ==
Pope fell ill at his Newport, Rhode Island home and was hospitalized on August 9, 1937. Pope was diagnosed with abdominal cancer. He died on the night of August 27, 1937 at Presbyterian Hospital in New York City. He was 63. His body was returned to Newport County for burial at a country church on the outskirts of Newport.

=== Legacy ===
A 1991 exhibition at the National Gallery of Art, John Russell Pope and the Building of the National Gallery of Art, spurred reappraisal of his work. For some time, it had been scorned and derided as overly historicist by many critics influenced by International Modernism. A Pope also served as an early mentor and employer of American modernist Lester C. Tichy.

Pope was the maternal grandfather of the actress Andra Akers.

== Gallery ==
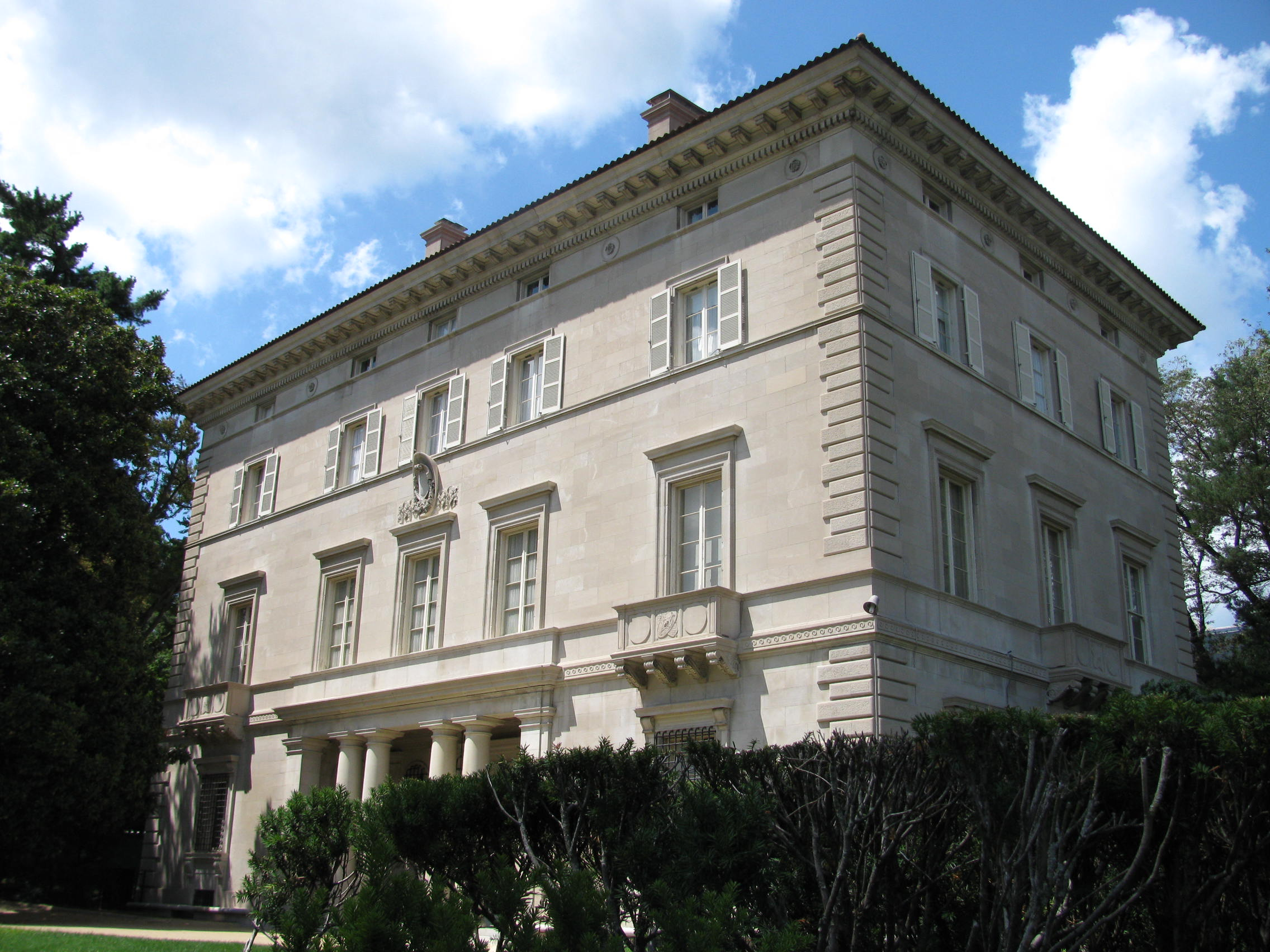
1908: McCormick House (Washington, D.C.) (now a Brazilian Embassy residence)

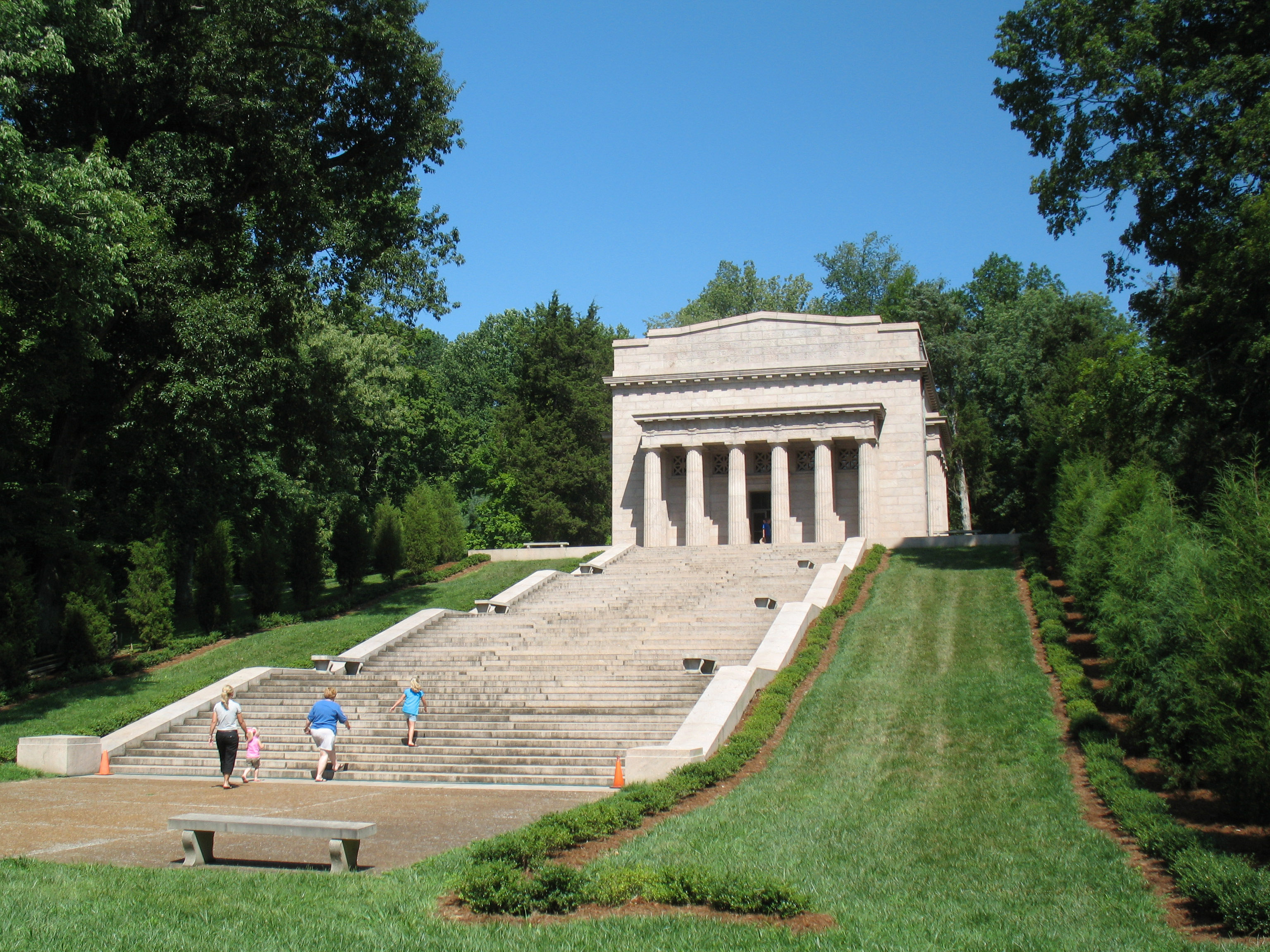
1909–1911: Memorial Building Abraham Lincoln Birthplace National Historical Park

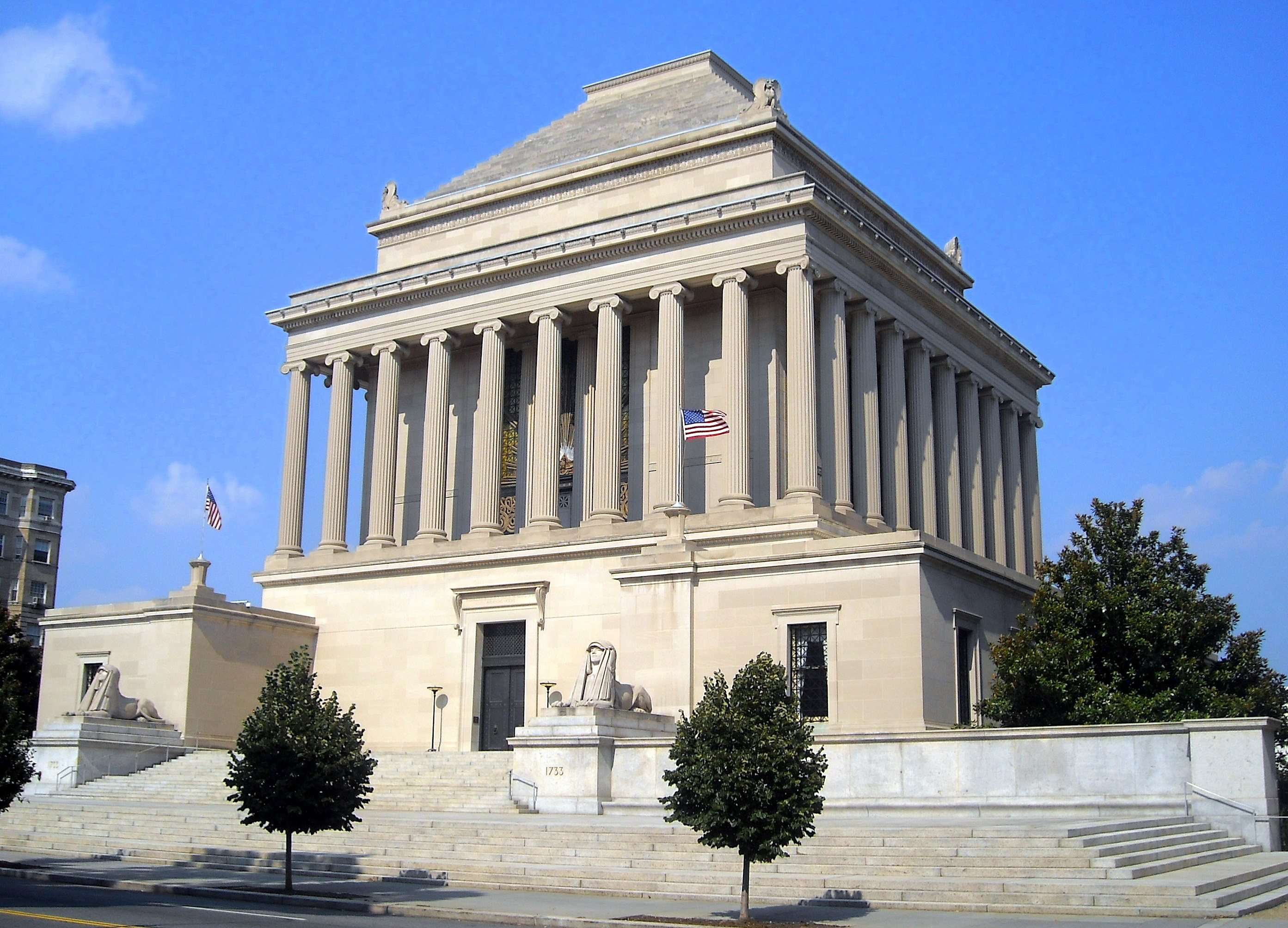
1911–1915: House of the Temple, Washington, D.C.

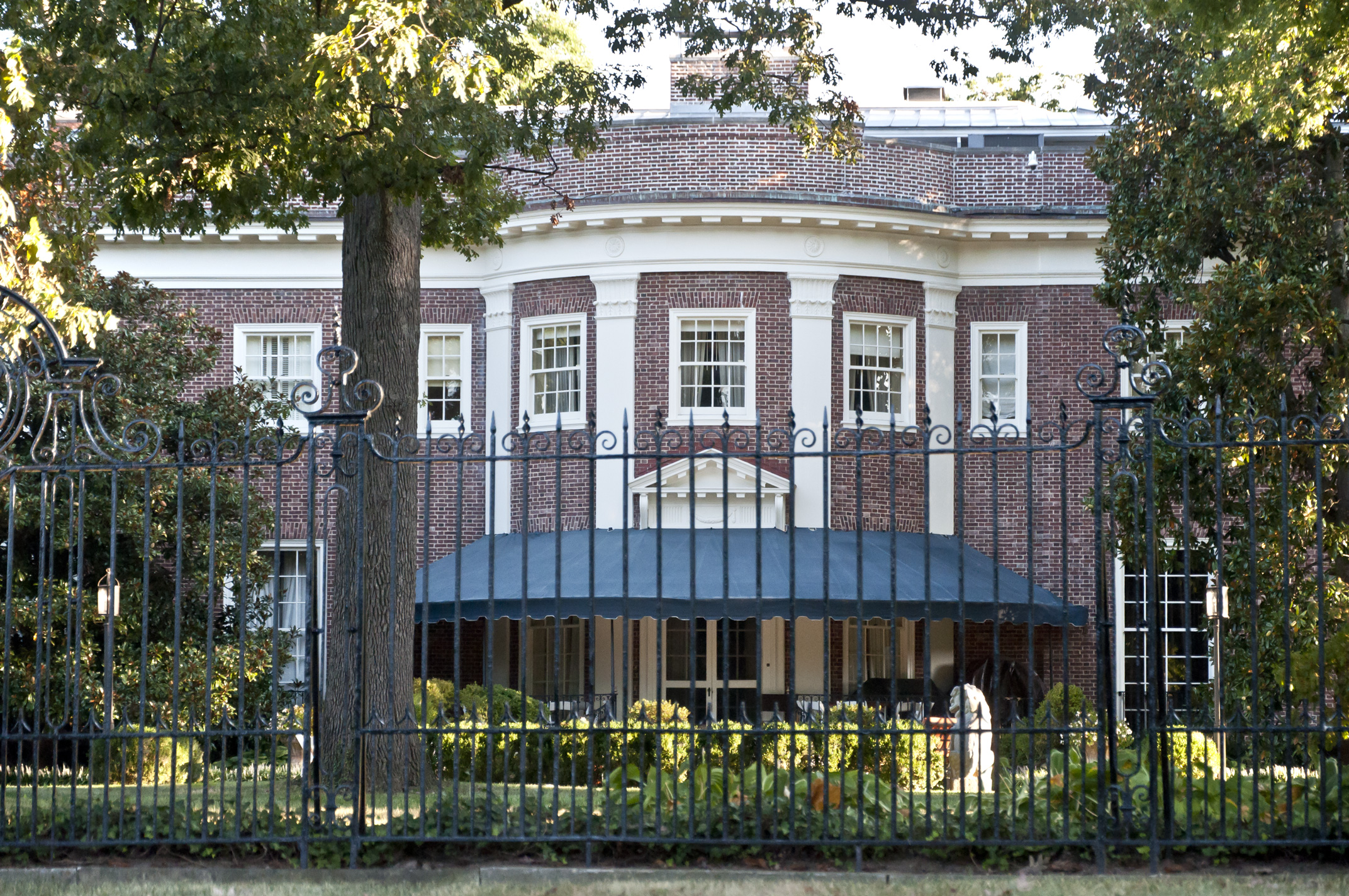
1911–1915: Charlcote House, Baltimore, Maryland

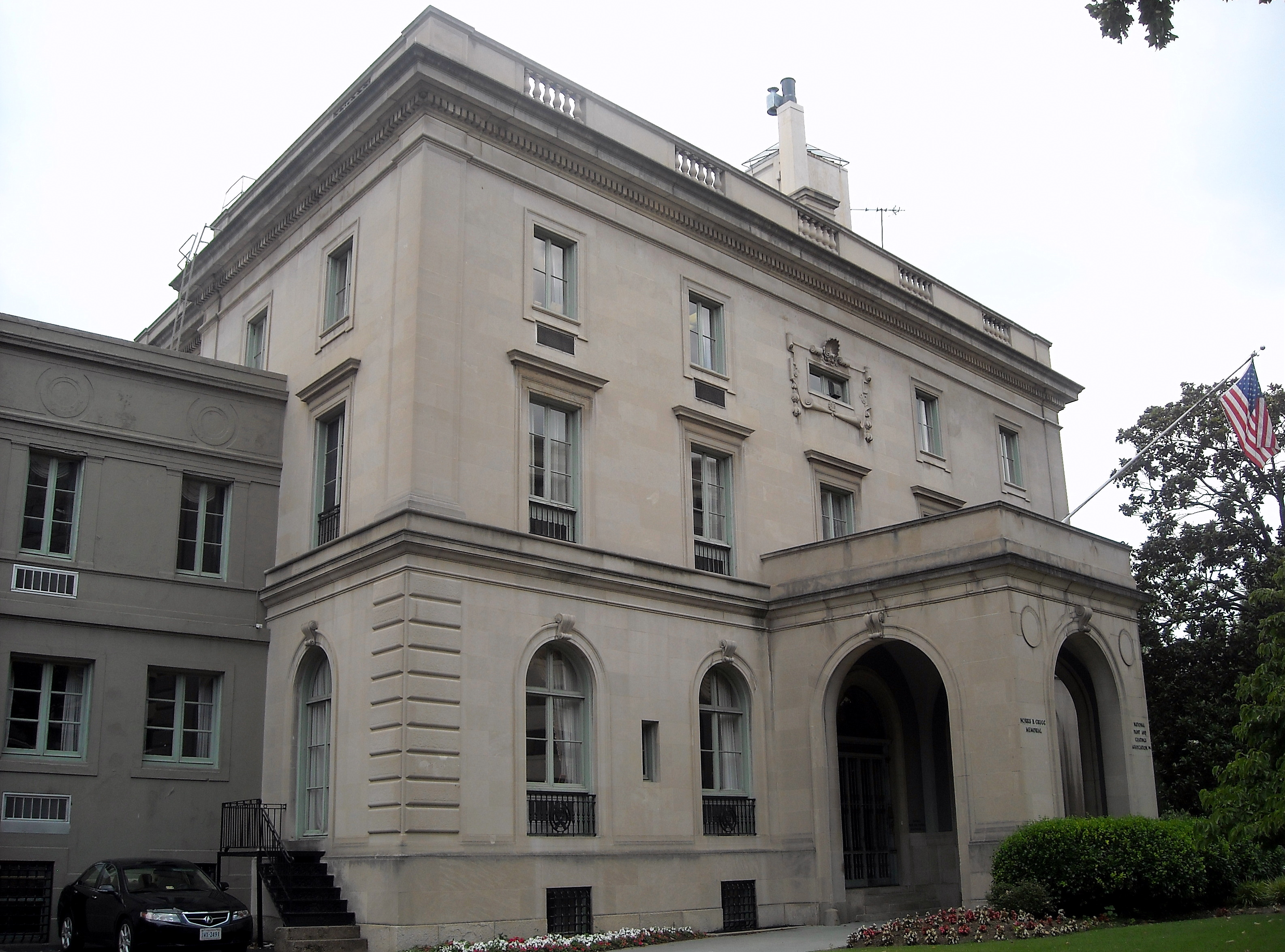
1912: Morton House (renovation of Brodhead-Bell-Morton Mansion), now Embassy of Hungary in Washington, D.C.

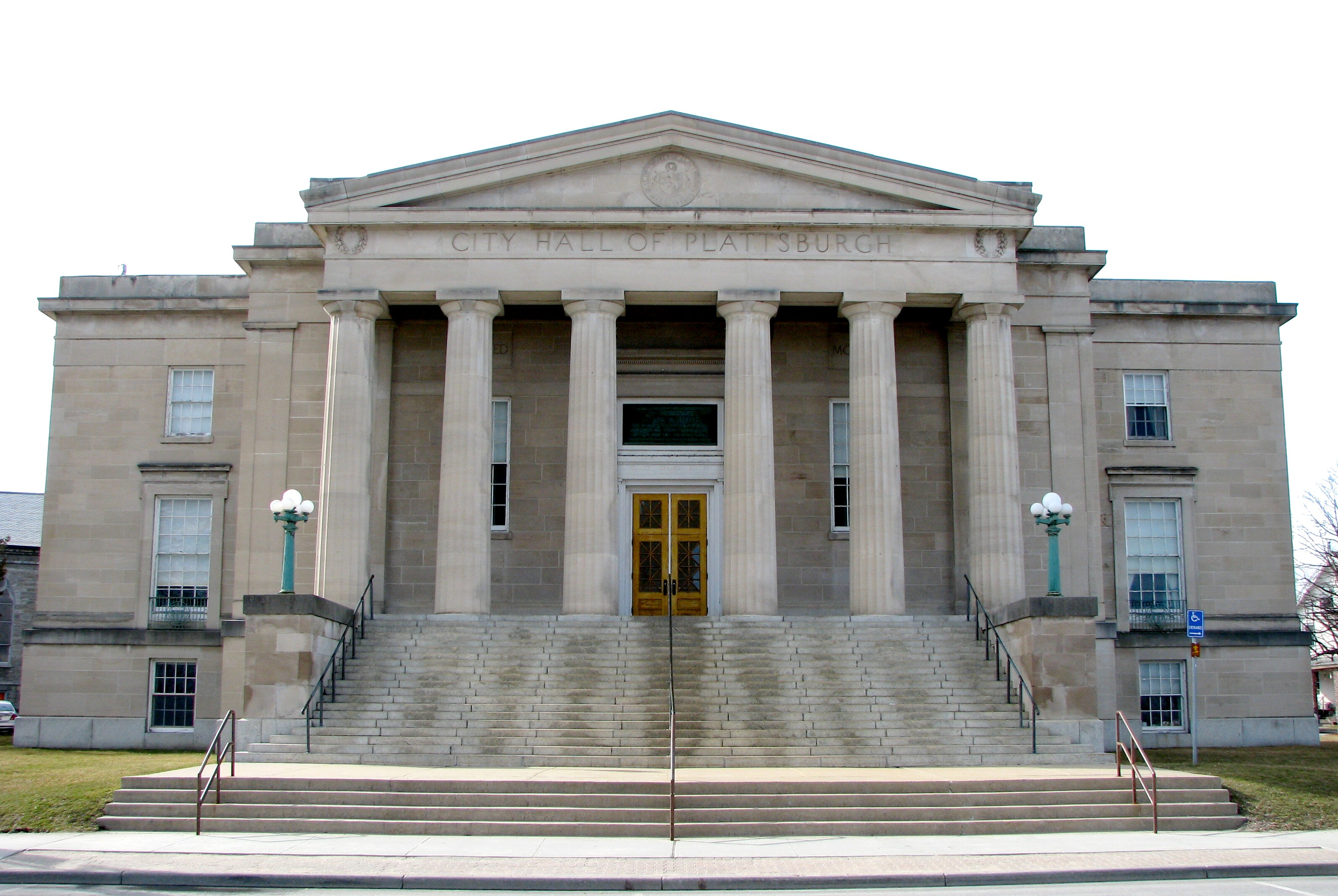
1917: City Hall, Plattsburgh, New York

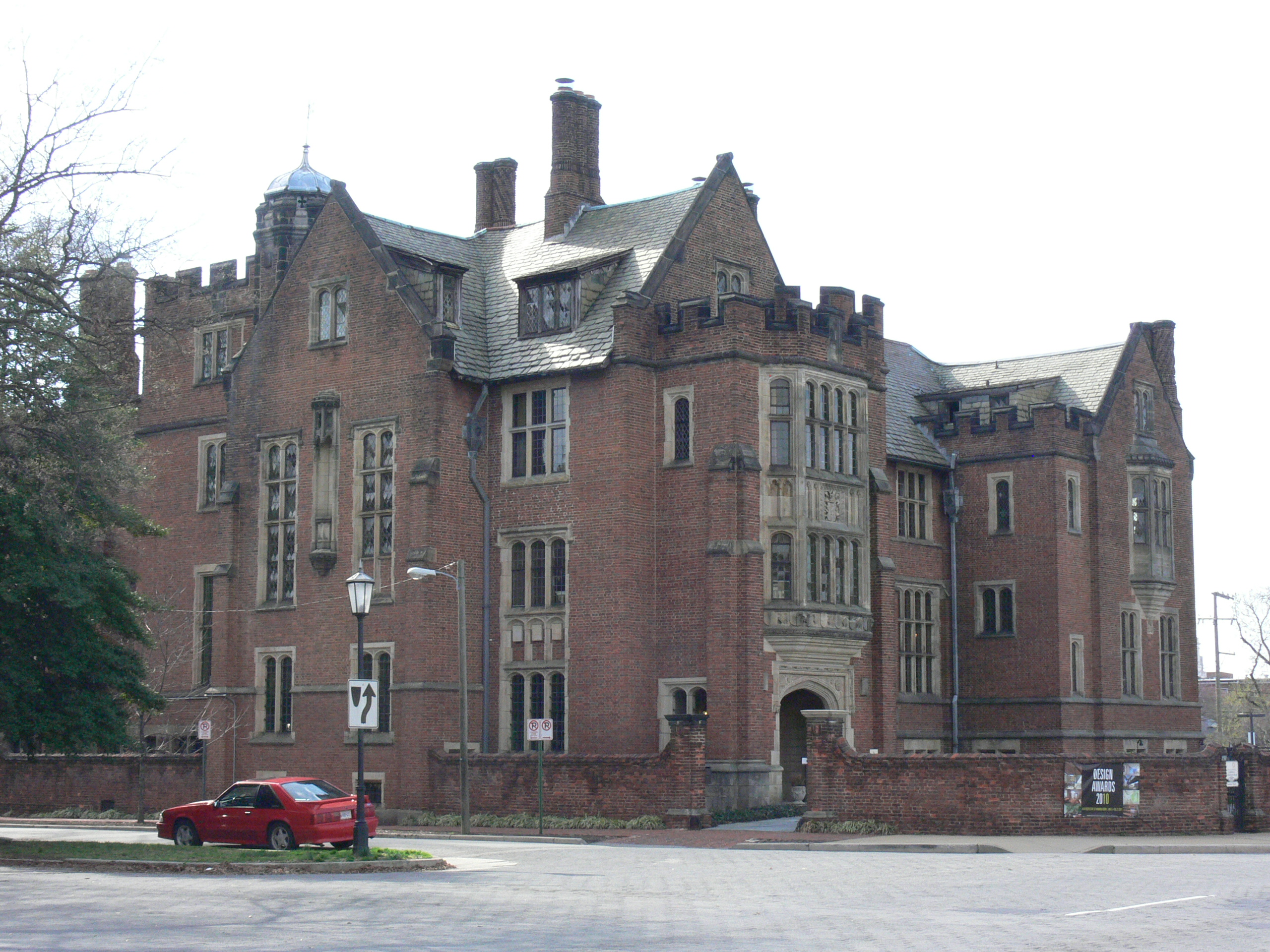
1916–1919: Branch House, Richmond, Virginia

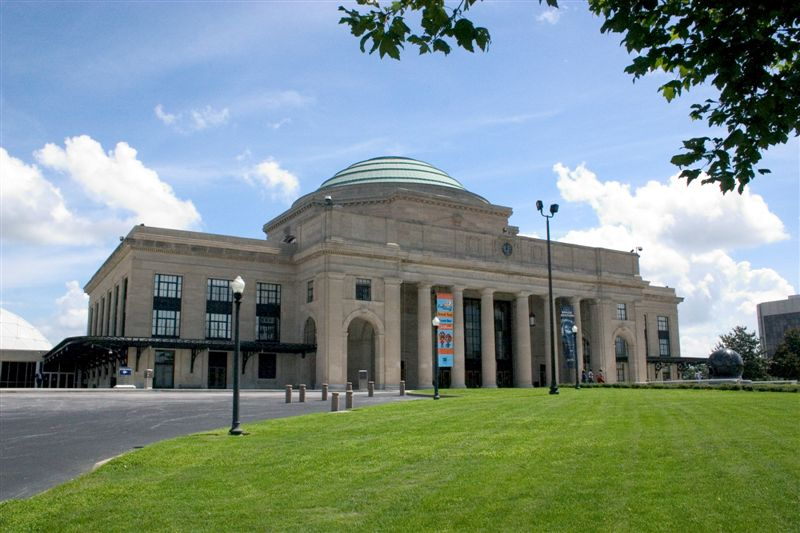
1919: Union Station (now the Virginia Science Museum), Richmond, Virginia

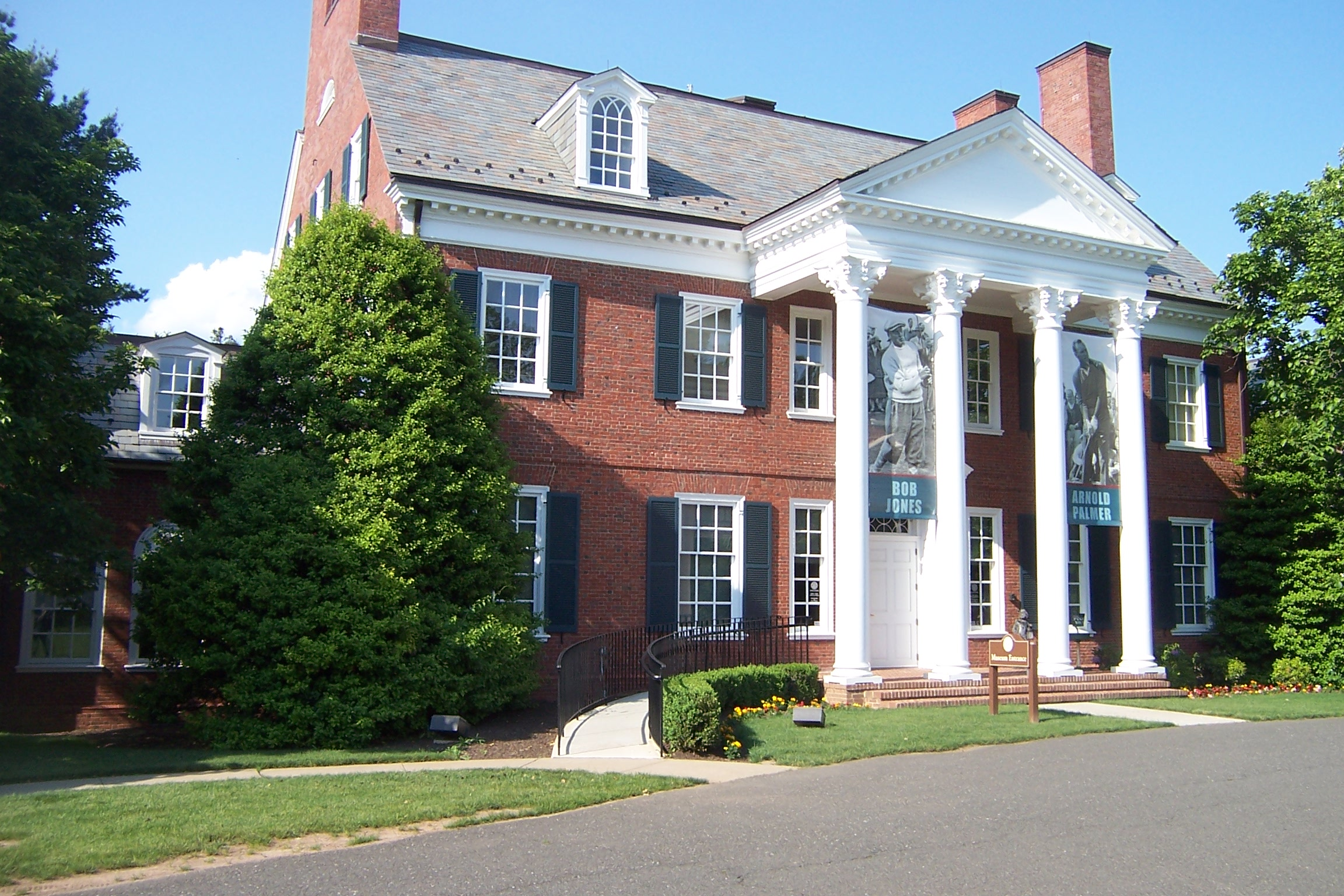
1919: Frothingham Home, now United States Golf Association Museum, Far Hills, New Jersey

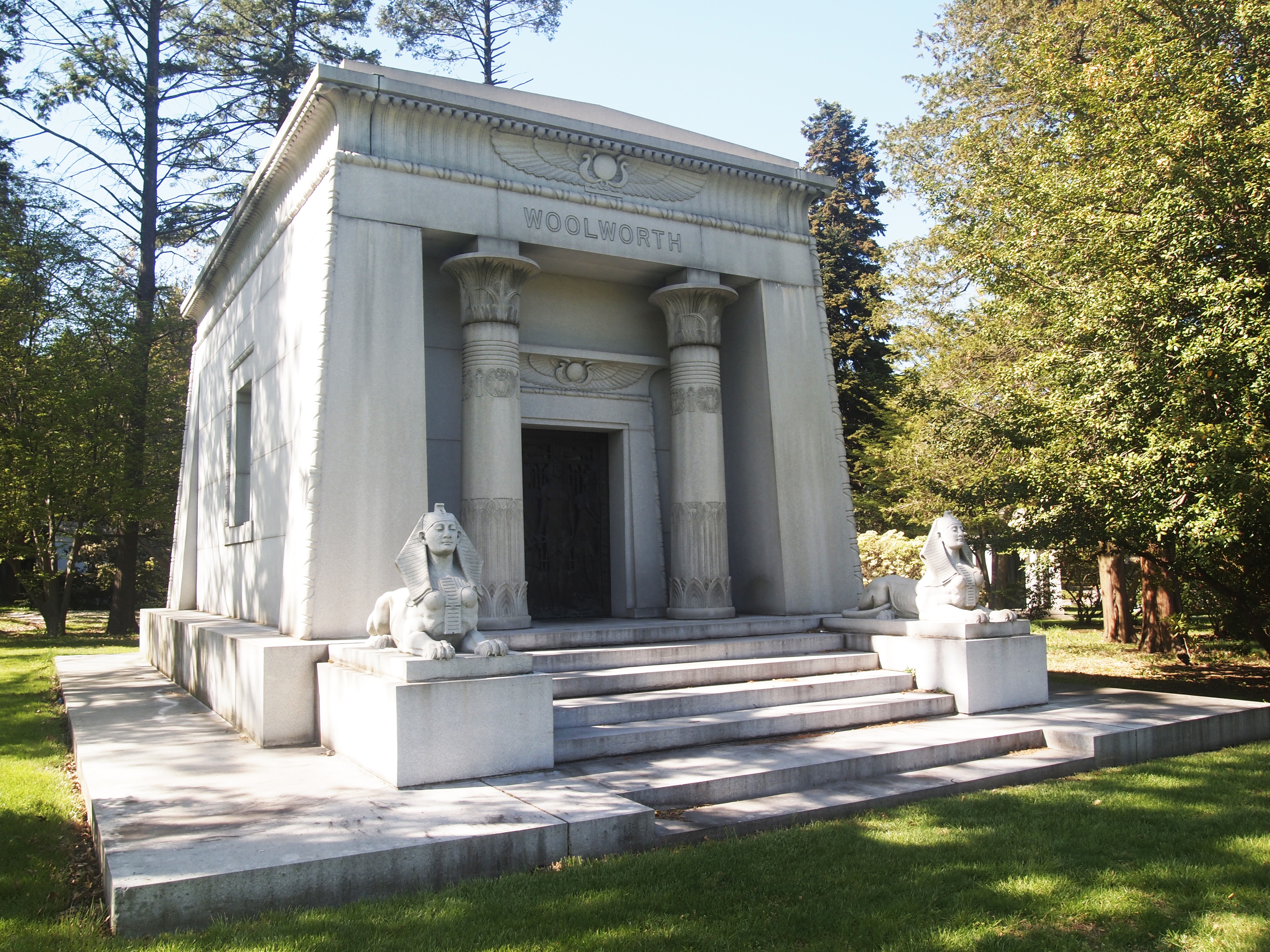
1920: F.W. Woolworth Mausoleum, Woodlawn Cemetery, The Bronx, New York

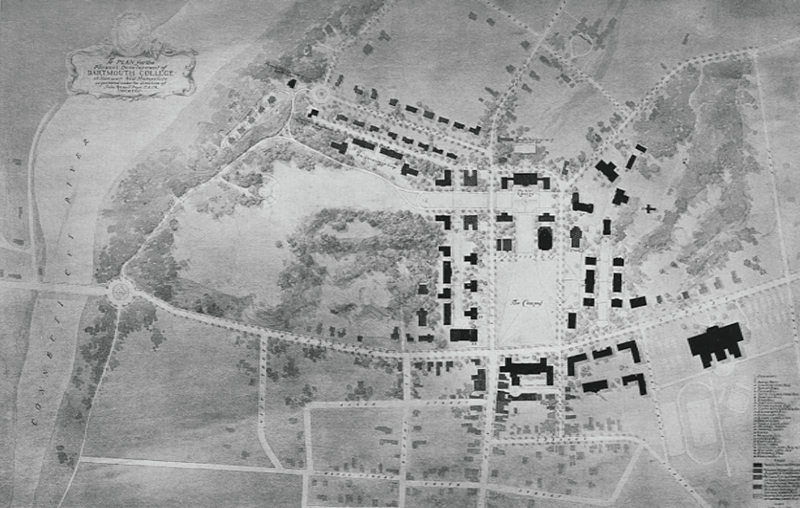
1922: Dartmouth College Master Plan

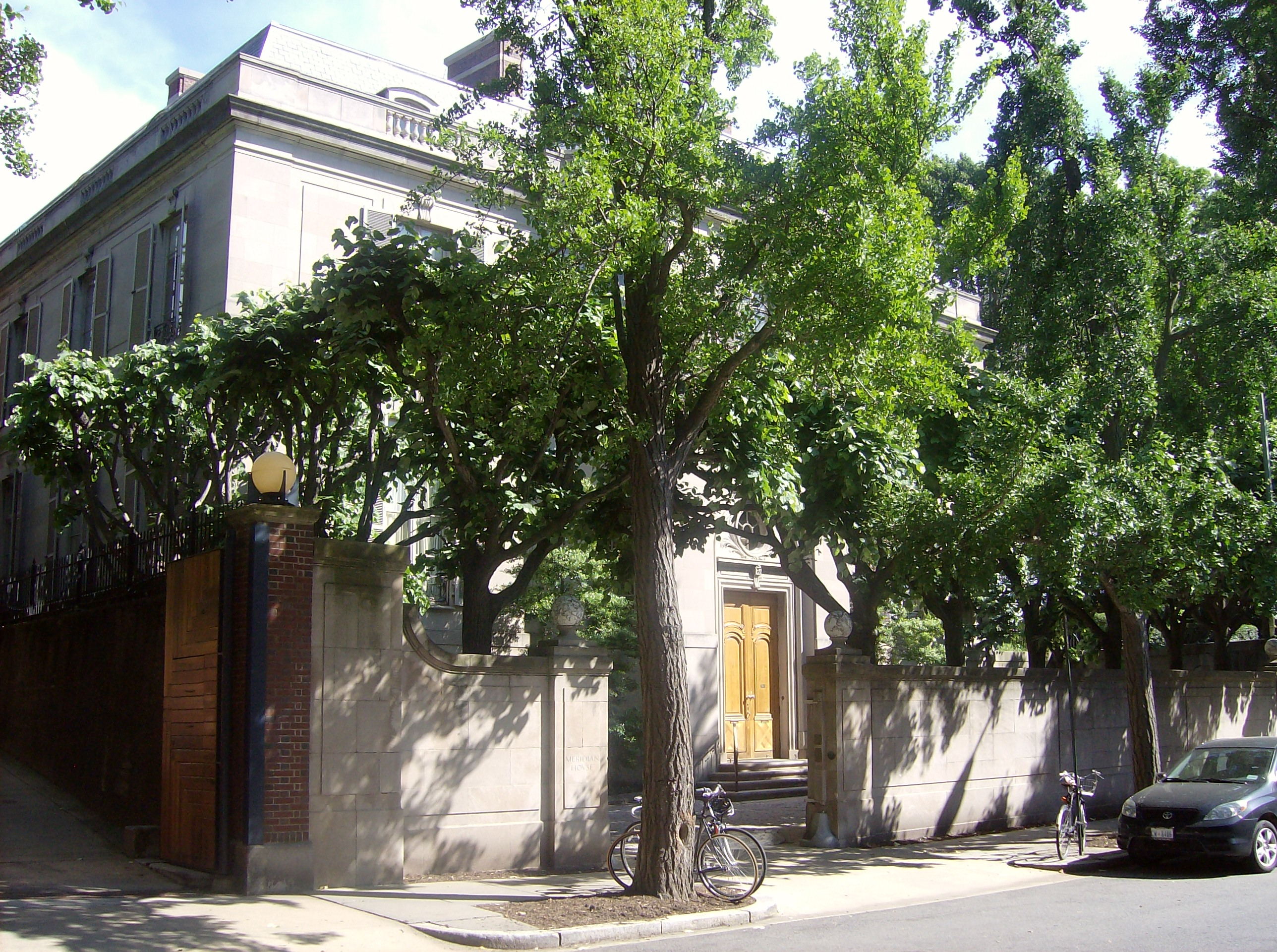
1923: Meridian House, Washington, D.C.

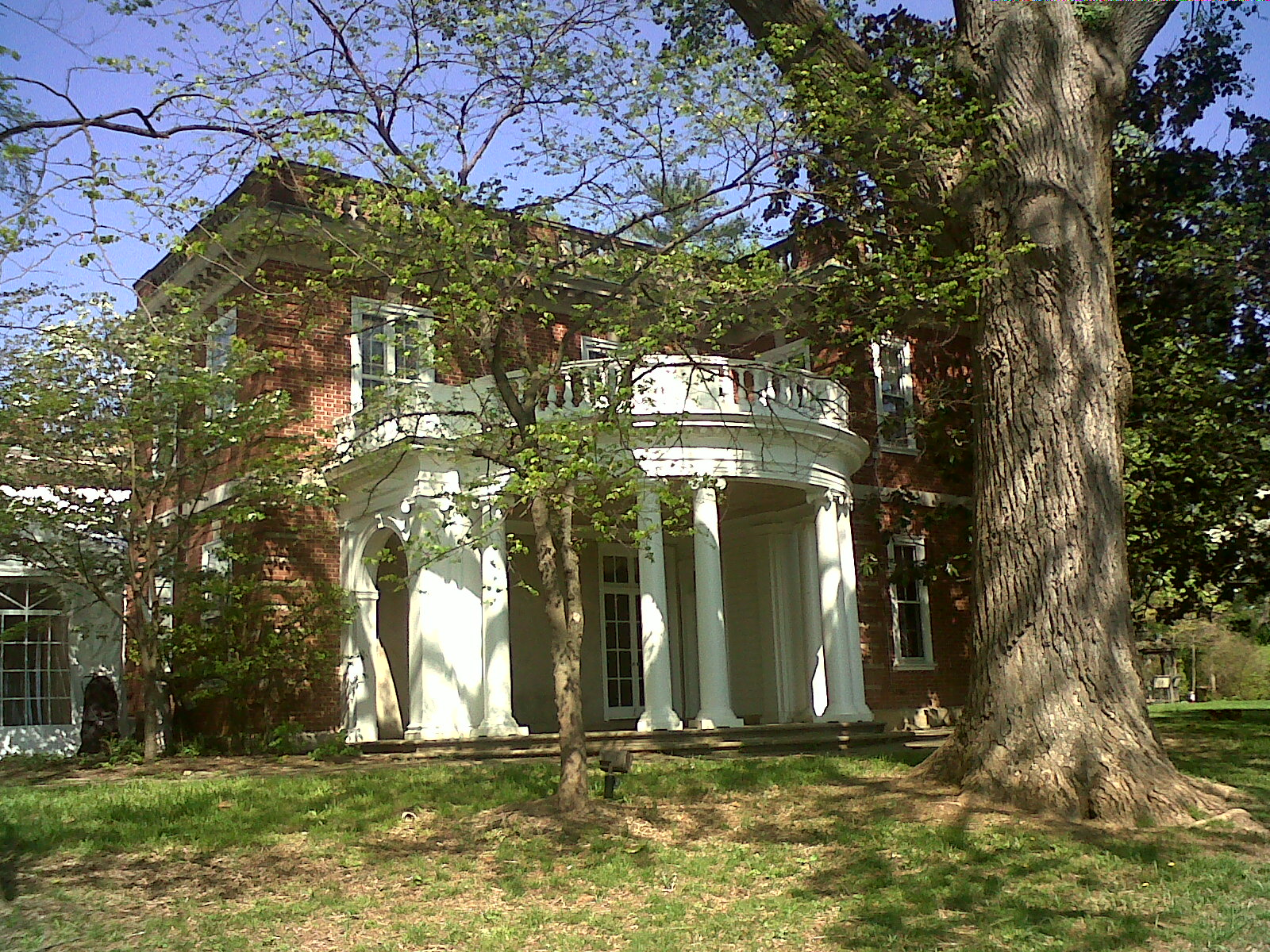
1927–28: Woodend, Chevy Chase, Maryland

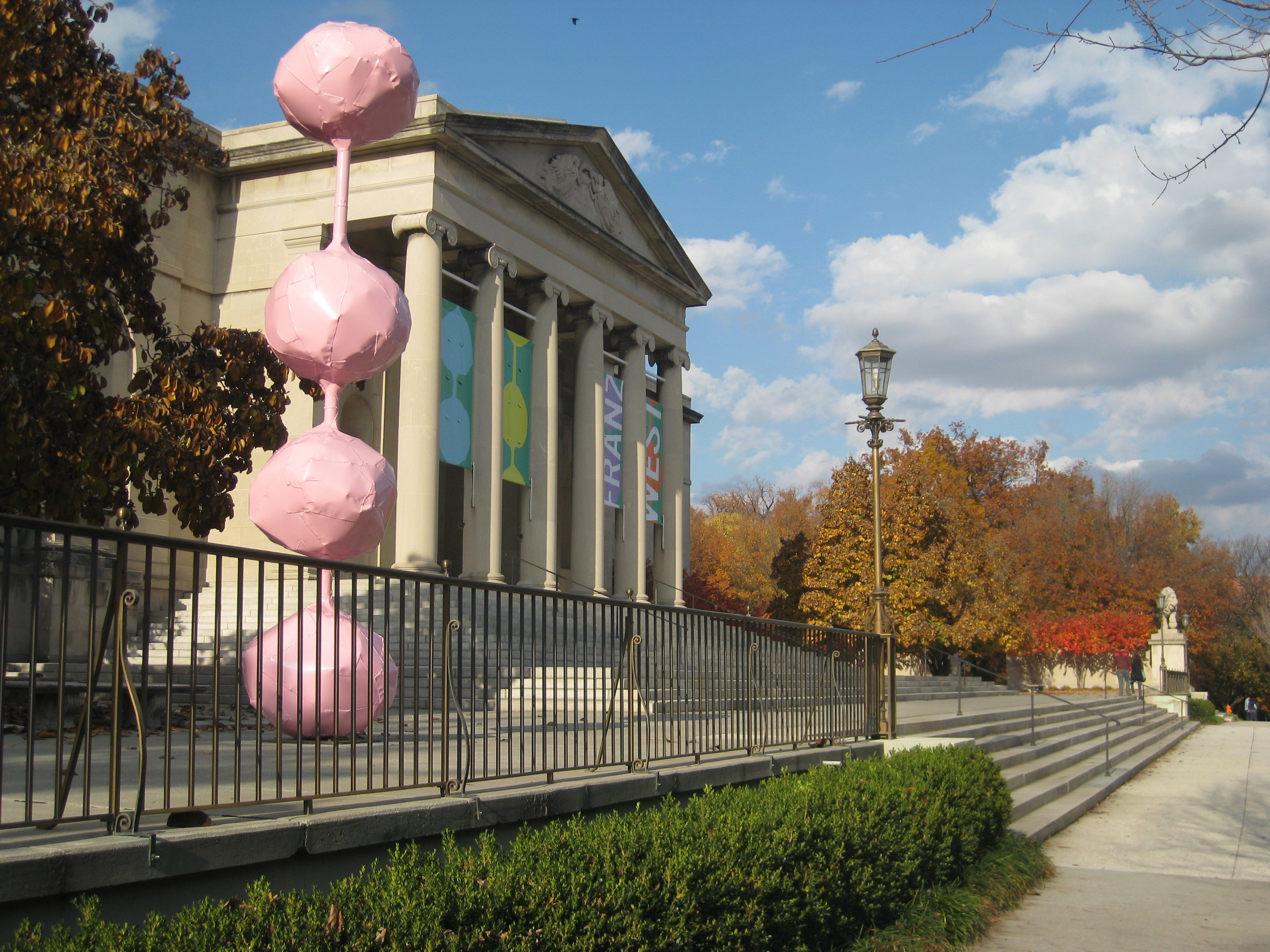
1927–1929: Baltimore Museum of Art, Baltimore, Maryland

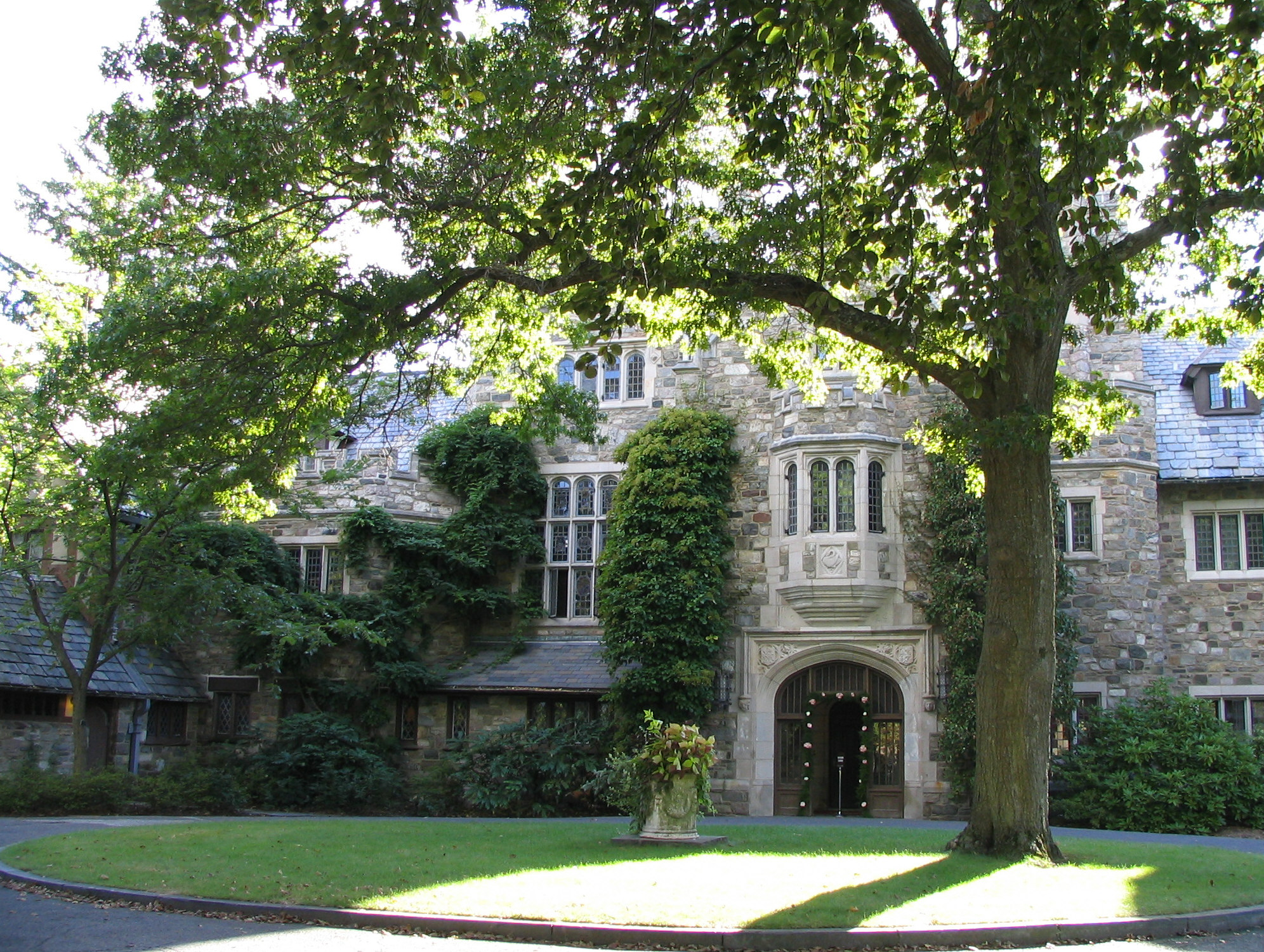
1927±: Skylands Manor, Ringwood, New Jersey (New Jersey Botanical Garden)

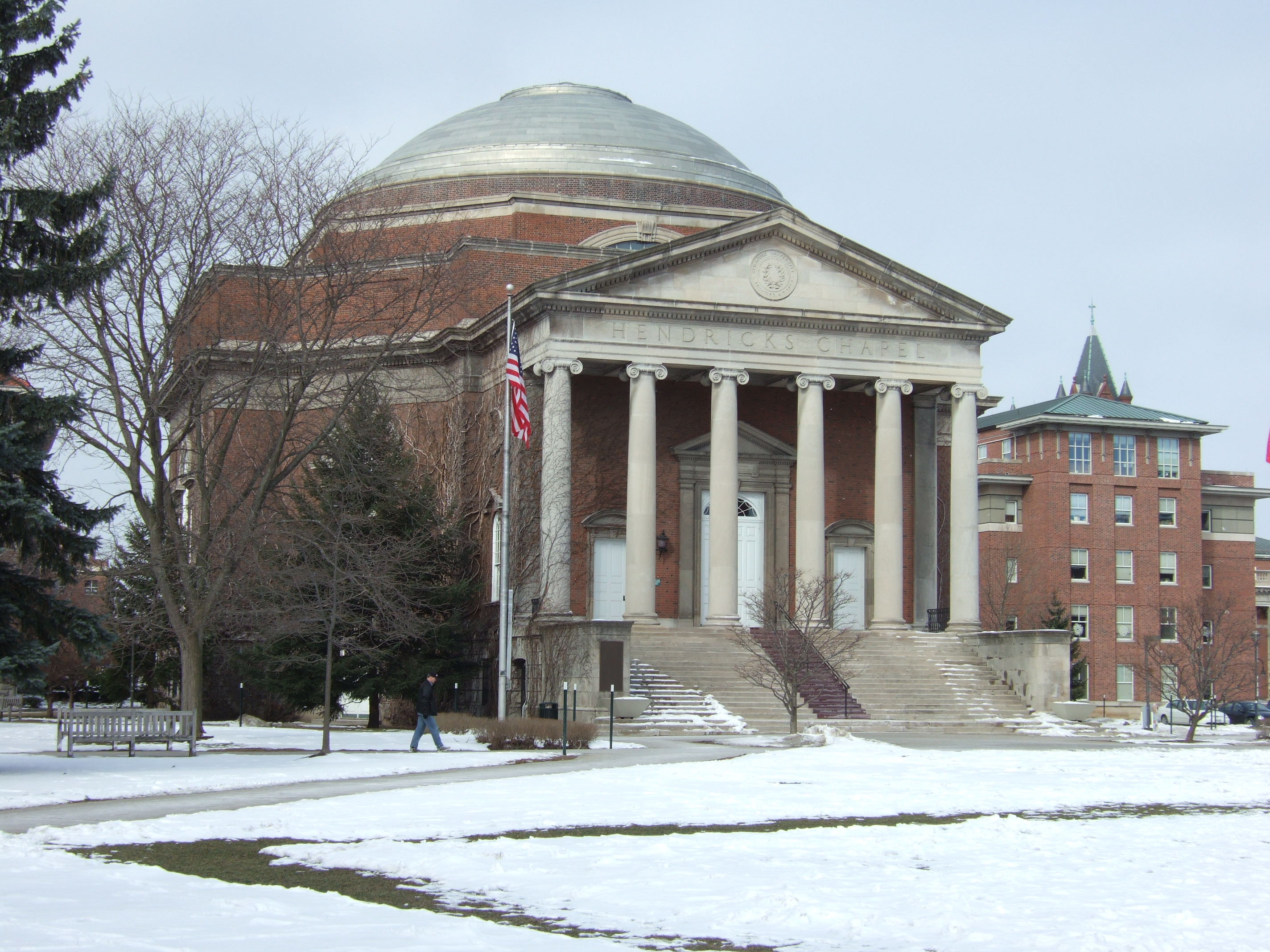
1928: Hendricks Chapel, Syracuse University, Syracuse, New York

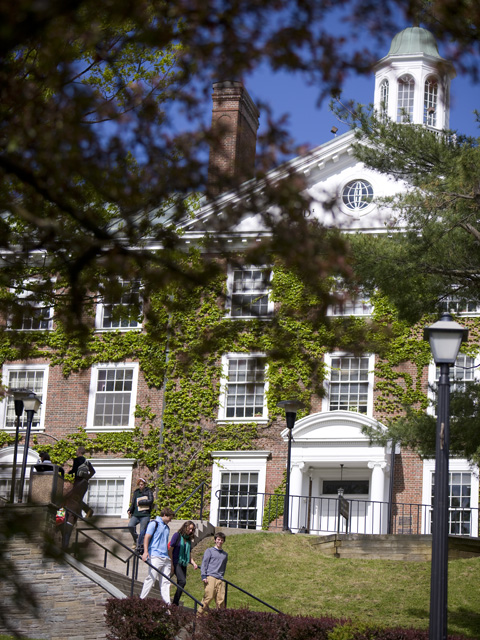
1928: Breese Hall, Hartwick College, Oneonta, New York

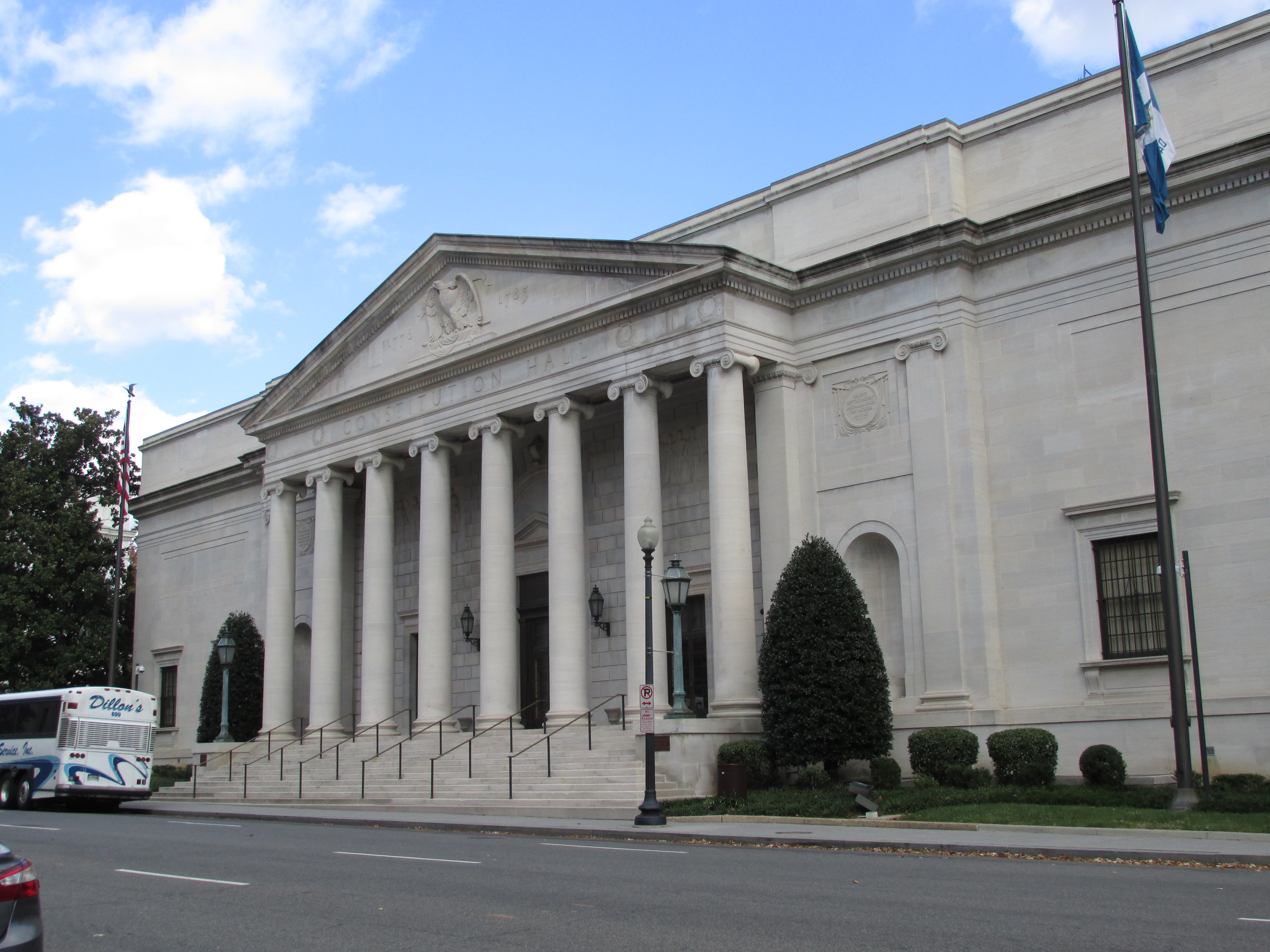
1929: Constitution Hall, Washington, D.C.

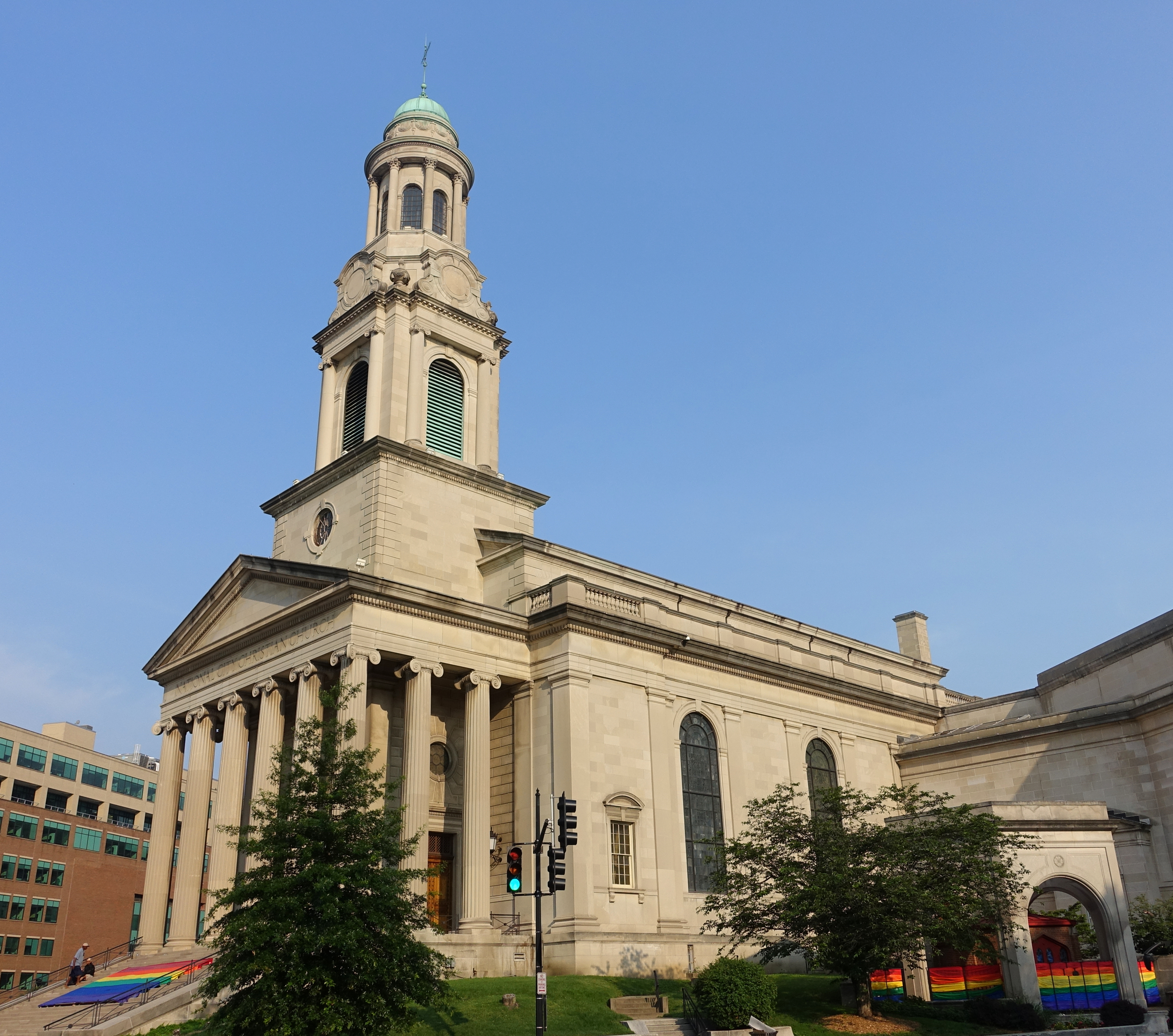
1930: National City Christian Church, Washington, D.C.

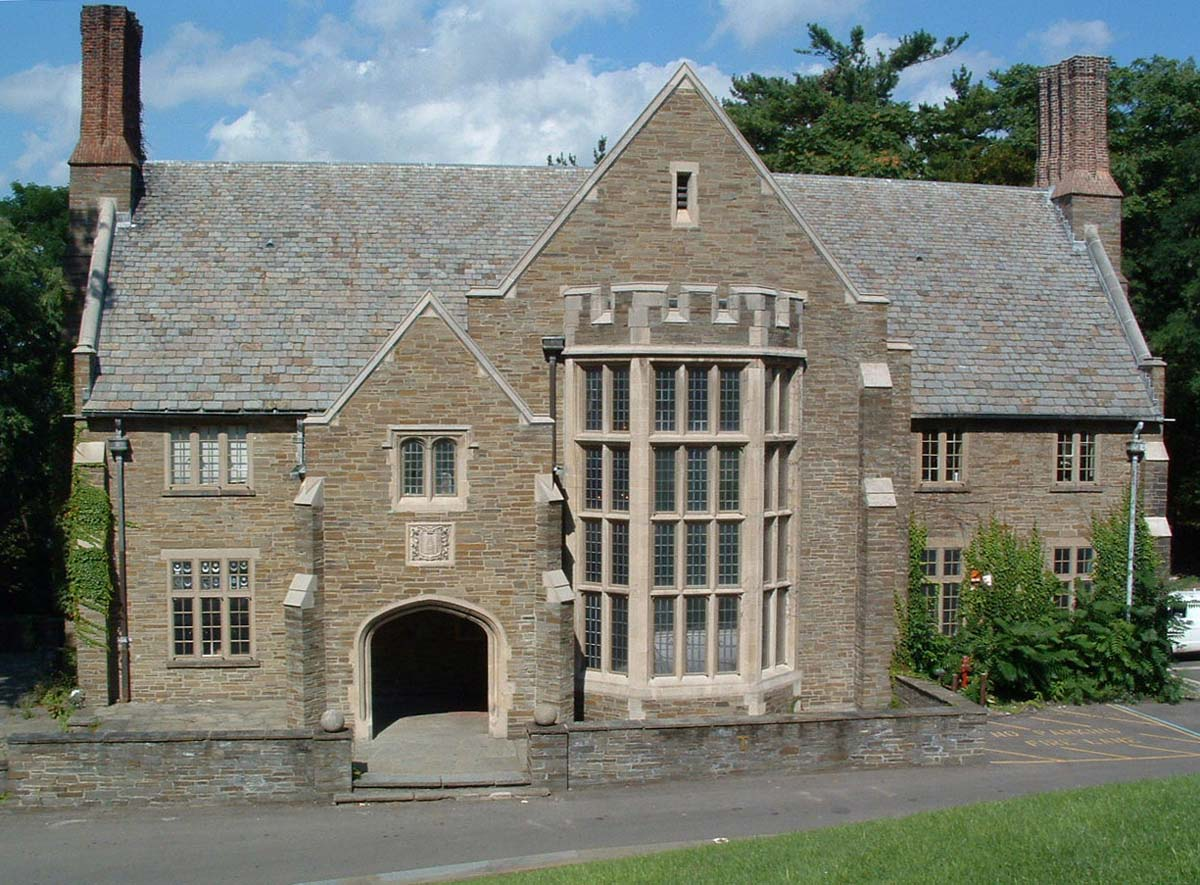
1931: Chapter House, Alpha Delta Phi, Cornell University

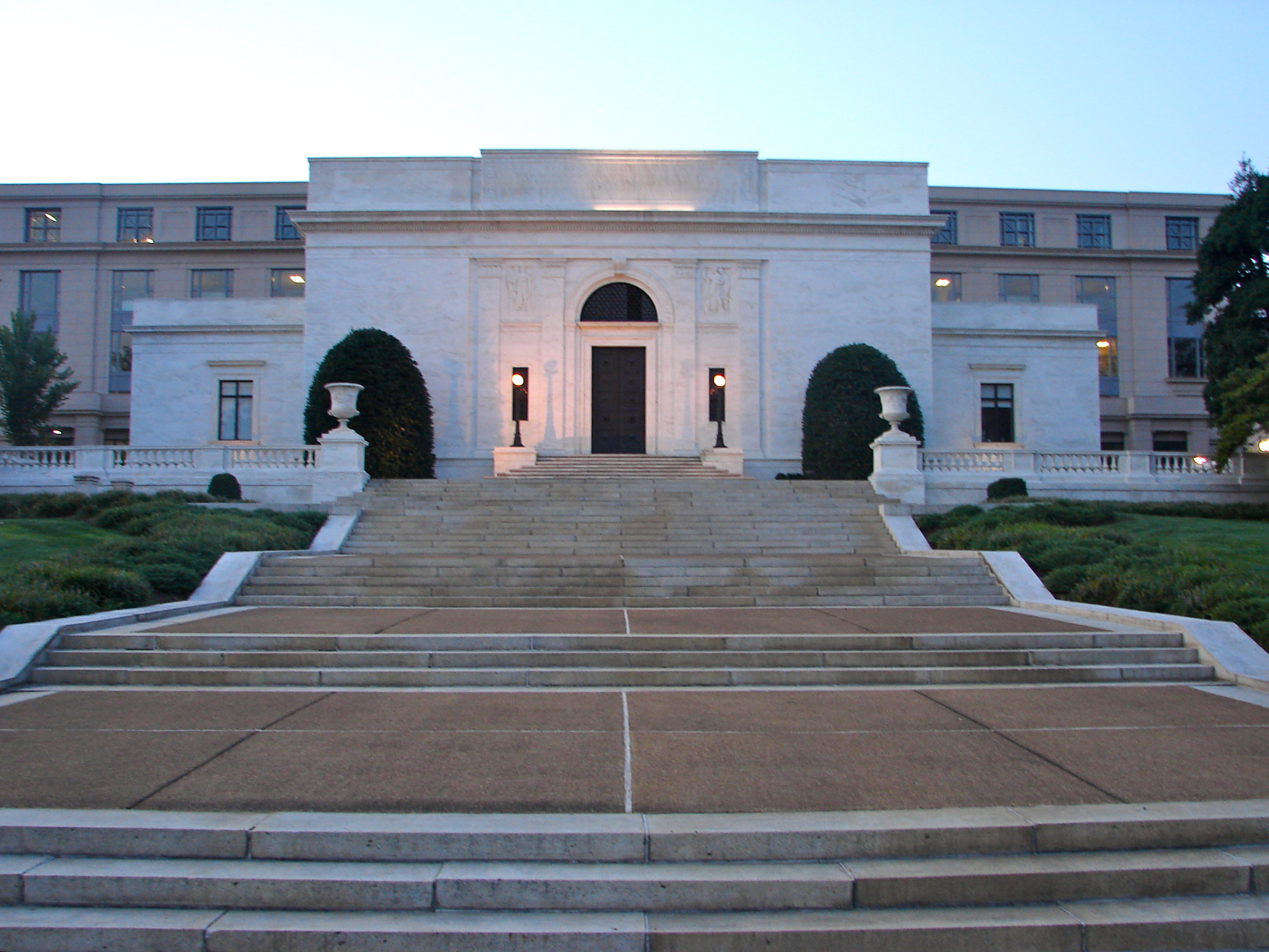
1933: American Institute of Pharmacy Building, Washington, D.C.

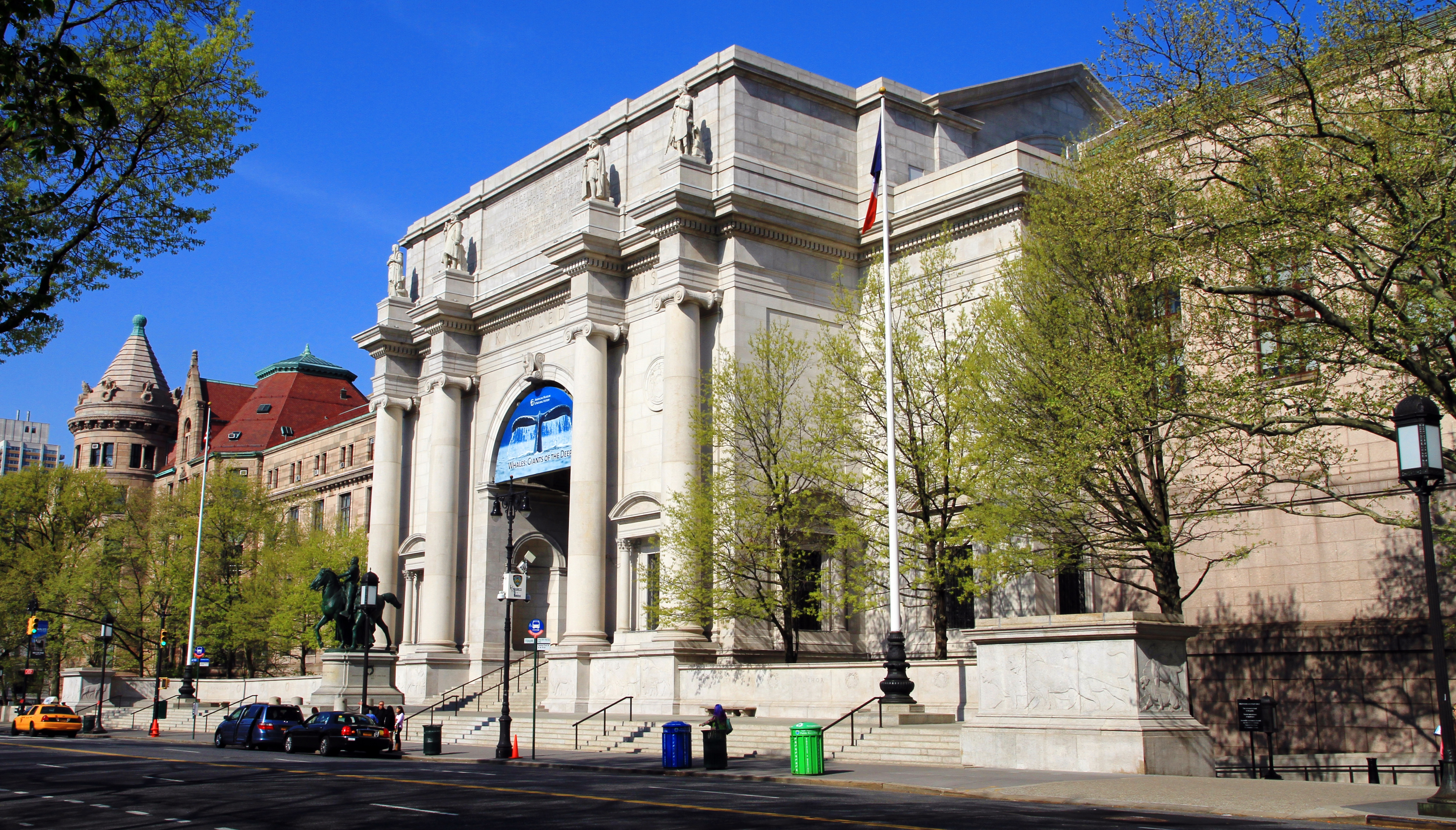
1929–1935: NY State Theodore Roosevelt Memorial (Arch, Entrance, & Hall), American Museum of Natural History, New York City

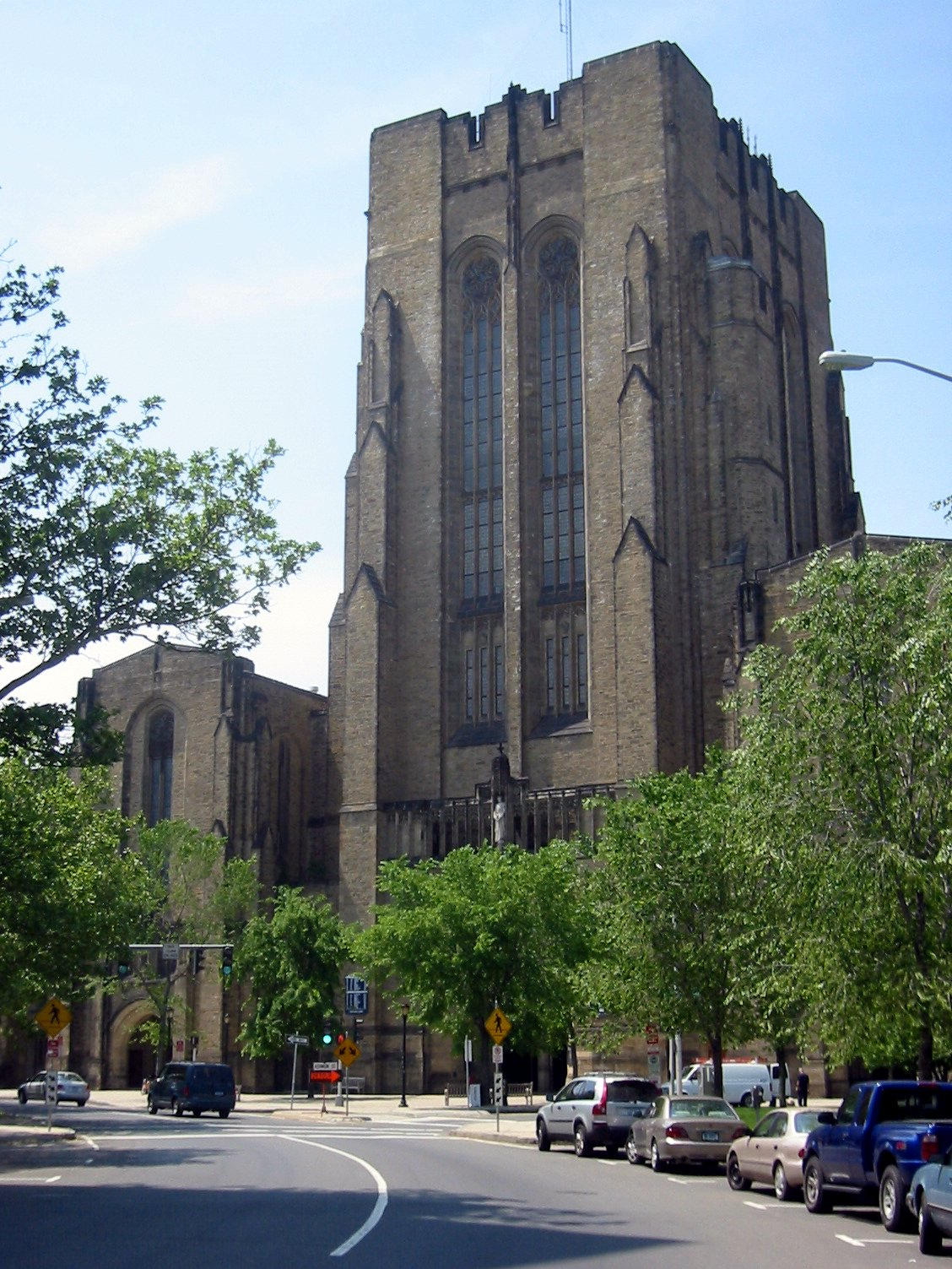
1932–1936: Payne Whitney Gymnasium, Yale University, New Haven

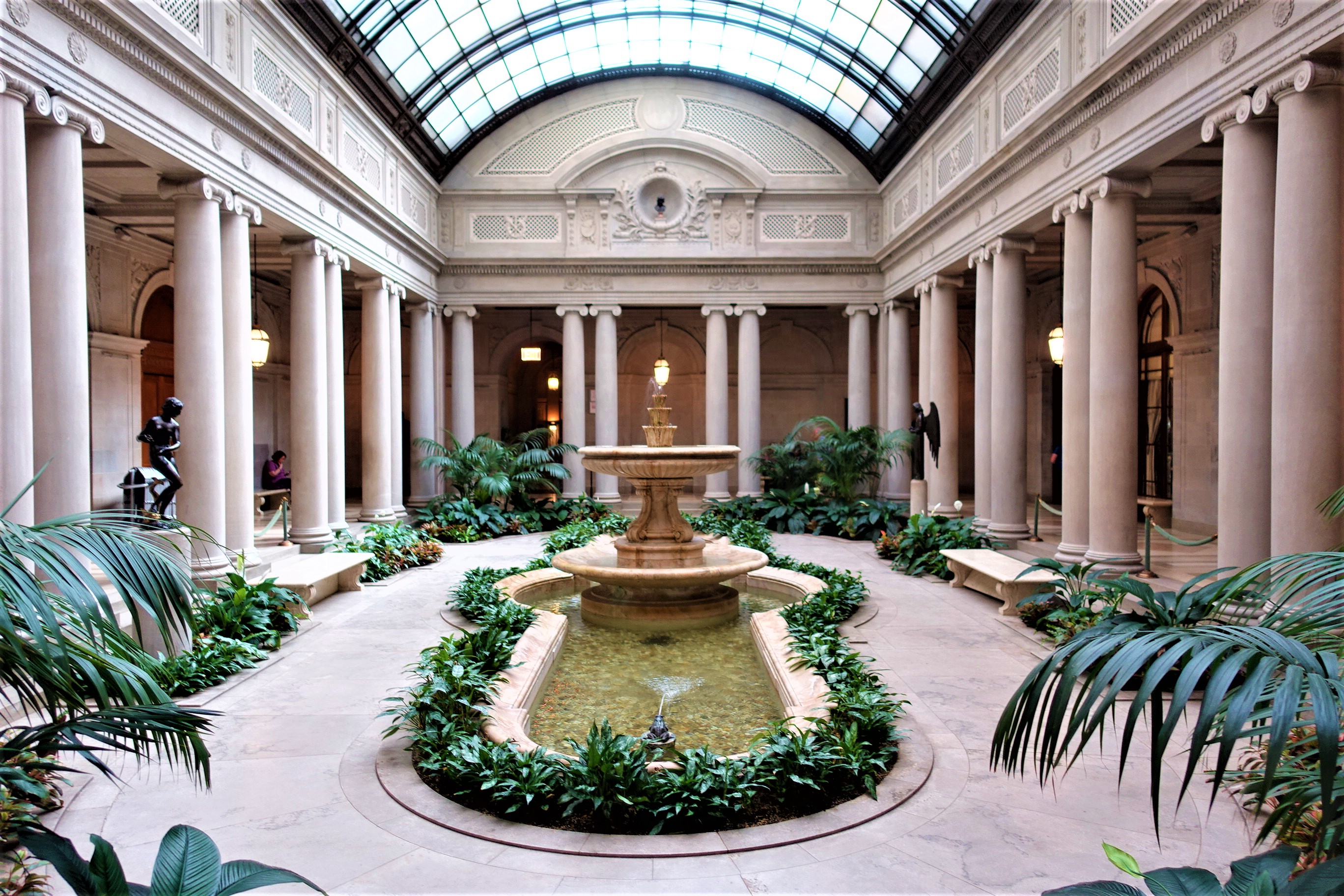
1935: Garden Court, Frick Collection, New York City

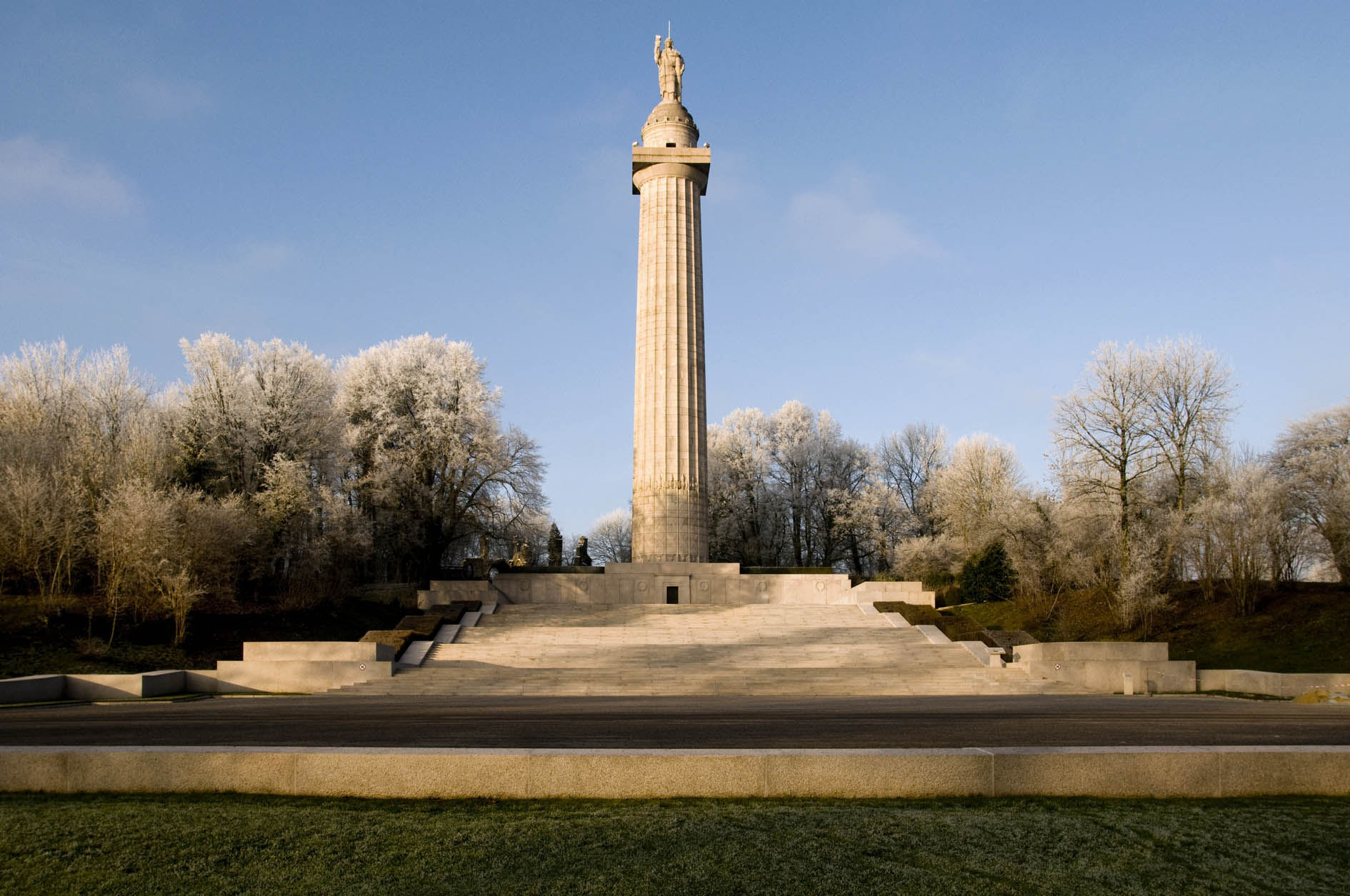
1935–1937: War Memorial at Montfaucon-d'Argonne, France

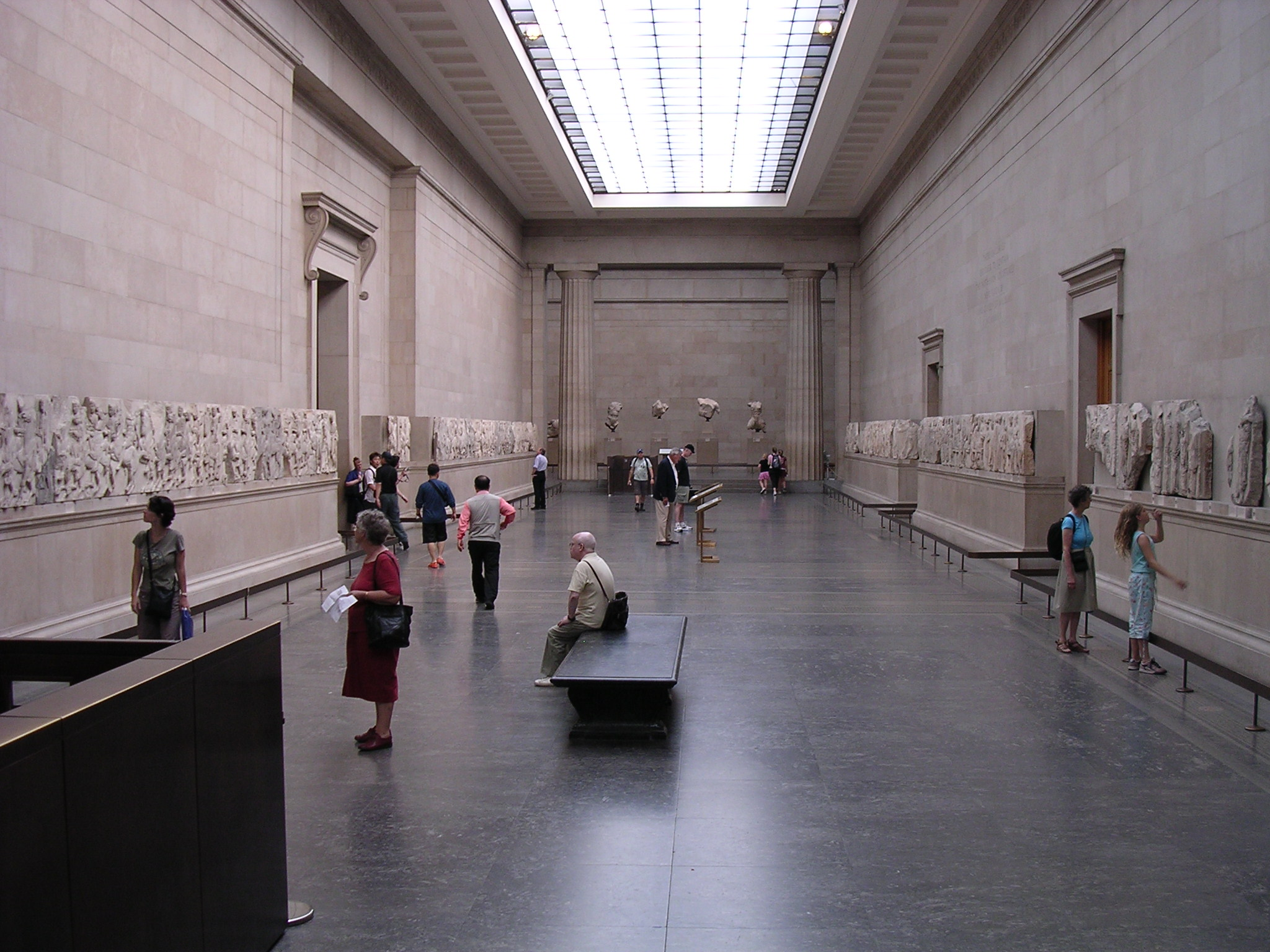
1931–1938: Duveen Gallery (Elgin Gallery), British Museum, London

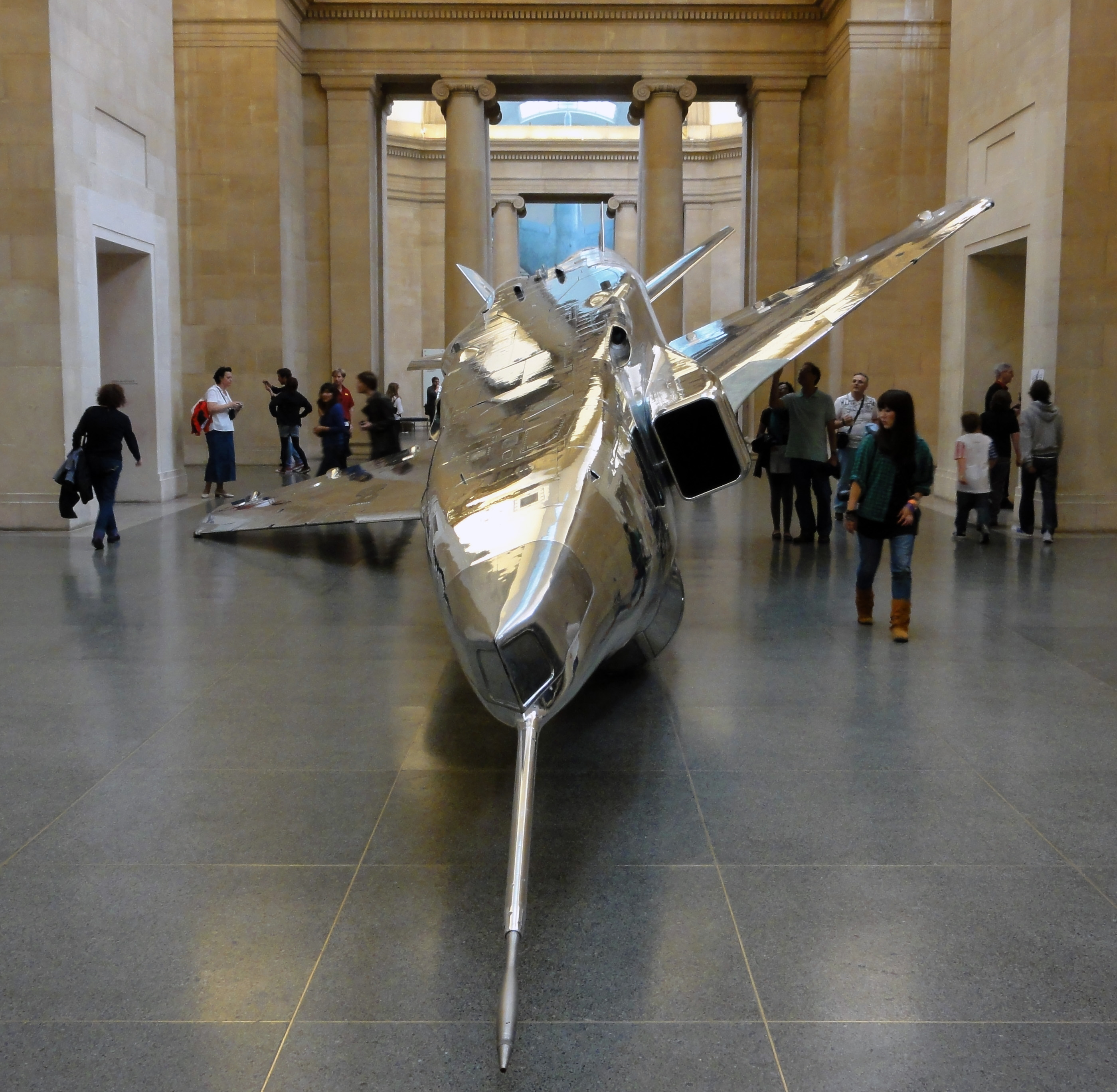
1937: Duveen Gallery (North Gallery) Tate Britain, London, UK

=== Selected works ===
- 1910: William B. Leeds Mausoleum, Woodlawn Cemetery, The Bronx, New York
- 1926: University Club, Milwaukee, Wisconsin
- 1927: Huntington Mausoleum, San Marino, California
- 1927: "The Waves" (Pope's Newport residence), 61 Ledge Road, Newport, Rhode Island
- 1931: First Congregational Church, Columbus, Ohio
- 1933–1935: National Archives Building, Washington, D.C.
- 1936: Dixie Plantation House, Greenville, Florida
- 1938–1941: National Gallery of Art, Washington, D.C.
- 1939–1942: Jefferson Memorial, Washington, D.C.

== See also ==
- Category:John Russell Pope buildings
- Eggers & Higgins

== Bibliography ==
- Bedford, Steven McLeod. John Russell Pope: Architect of Empire, New York: 1998.
- Garrison, James B. Mastering Tradition: The Residential Architecture of John Russell Pope. New York: Acanthus Press, 2004. ISBN 978-0-926494-24-4
