= Woodend (Chevy Chase, Maryland) =

Historic house in Maryland, United States

- U.S. National Register of Historic Places
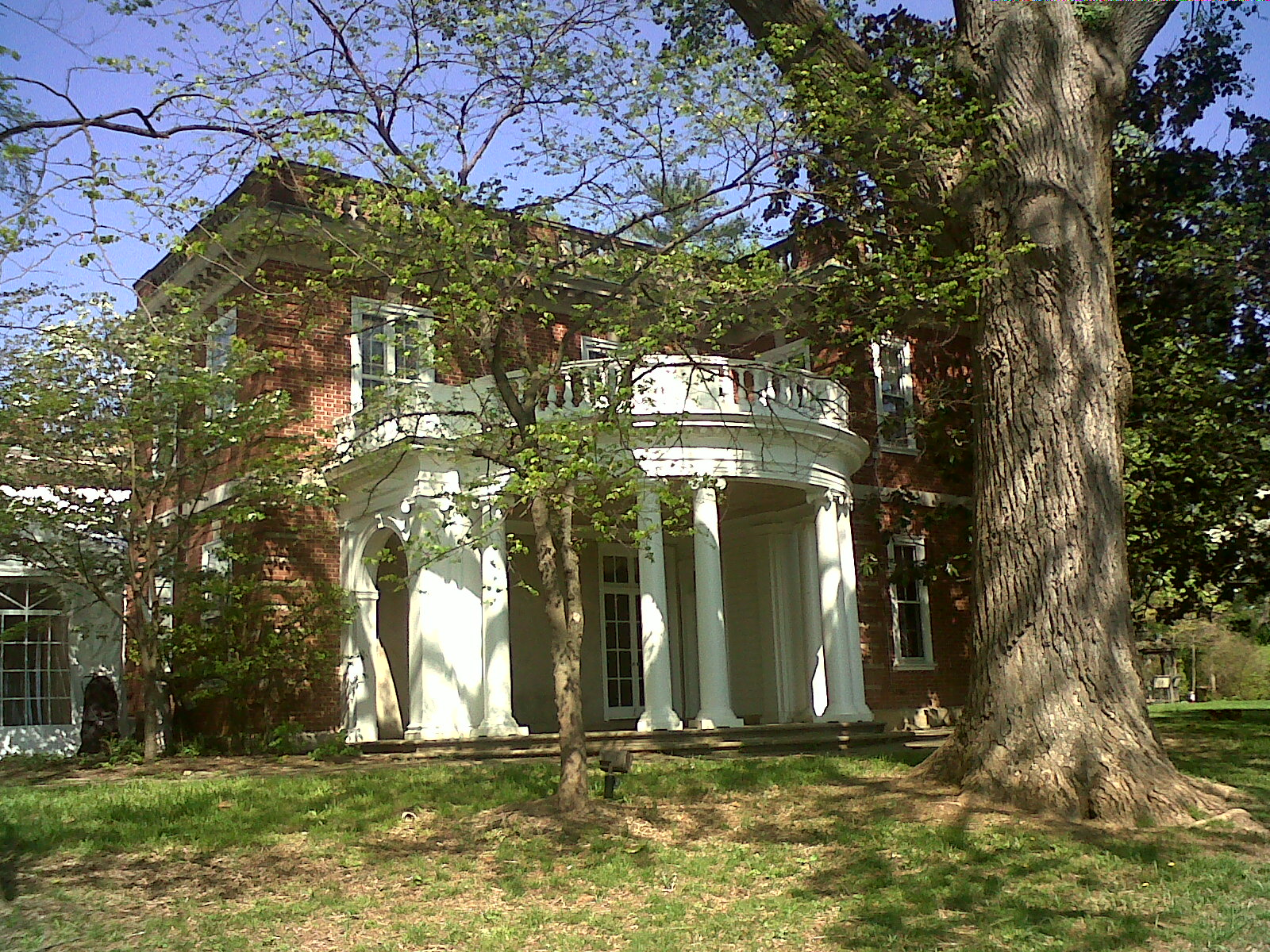

- Location within Maryland Location within the United States
- Location: 8940 Jones Mill Rd., Chevy Chase, Maryland
- Coordinates: 39°0′9″N 77°4′1″W
- Area: 32.6 acres (13.2 ha)
- Built: 1927
- Architect: Pope, John Russell
- Architectural style: Colonial Revival, Georgian Revival
- NRHP reference No.: 80001824
- Added to NRHP: March 20, 1980

Woodend is a historic home located in the Montgomery County, Maryland, town of Chevy Chase. This Georgian Revival house was built by Chester and Marion Wells in 1927–1928, and owned by the Audubon Naturalist Society of the Central Atlantic States. It is a 2 1/2-story house with Flemish bond brick walls and brick quoins. The house was designed by John Russell Pope.

The society maintains the Woodend Nature Sanctuary on the 40-acre (16 ha) property, which is open to the public.

It was listed on the National Register of Historic Places in 1980.
