= Meyer House =

Meyer House may refer to:

in the United States

(by state then city)

- Pearl and Bess Meyer House, Flora, Illinois, listed on the National Register of Historic Places (NRHP) in Clay County
- Dr. John and Gerda Meyer House, Beverly Shores, Indiana, listed on the NRHP in Porter County
- Meyer's Castle, Dyer, Indiana, listed on the NRHP as Joseph Ernest Meyer House
- Curtis & Lillian Meyer House, Charleston Township, Michigan, part of the NRHP-listed Galesburg Country Homes in Kalamazoo County
- Meyer House (Florissant, Missouri), listed on the NRHP in St. Louis County
- August Meyer House, Kansas City, Missouri, listed on the NRHP in Jackson County
- Sutter-Meyer House, University City, Missouri, listed on the NRHP in St. Louis County
- John Meyer House, Washington, Missouri, listed on the NRHP in Franklin County
- Meyer House (Portsmouth, Ohio), listed on the NRHP in Scioto County
- Frederick A.E. Meyer House, Salt Lake City, Utah, listed on the NRHP in Salt Lake County
- Meyer House (Olympia, Washington), listed on the NRHP in Thurston County
- White-Meyer House, Washington, D.C., listed on the National Register of Historic Places (NRHP) in Washington, D.C.
- Starke Meyer House, Fox Point, Wisconsin, listed on the NRHP in Milwaukee County
- Henry A. Meyer House, Shorewood, Wisconsin, listed on the NRHP in Milwaukee County

== See also ==
- Meyers House (disambiguation)
- Mayer House (disambiguation)
- Myer House (disambiguation)
- Myers House (disambiguation)
