= Myers House =

Myers House may refer to:

- Myers House (Helena-West Helena, Arkansas)
- Socrates A. Myers House, Salmon, Idaho
- Witt-Champe-Myers House, Dublin, Indiana
- Stephen and Harriet Myers House, Albany, New York
- Myers-Hicks Place, Byhalia, Mississippi
- John B. Myers House and Barn, Florissant, Missouri
- George J. Myers House, Kansas City, MO, listed on the NRHP in Missouri
- Myers-Masker House, Midland Park, New Jersey
- Myers-White House, Bethel, North Carolina
- Moses Myers House, administered by Chrysler Museum of Art, Norfolk, Virginia
- Tucker House and Myers House, Washington, D.C.
- Myers House (Martinsburg, West Virginia)
- Myers House, fictional home of Michael Myers in the Halloween franchise

== See also ==
- Myer House (disambiguation)
- Meyers House (disambiguation)
- Meyer House (disambiguation)
