= Mayer House =

Mayer House may refer to:

in the United States

(by state then city)

- Maxwell F. Mayer House, Little Rock, Arkansas, NRHP-listed
- Donovan-Mayer House, Helena, Montana, NRHP-listed in Lewis and Clark County
- S. C. Mayer House, Cincinnati, Ohio, NRHP-listed
- Mayer-Banderob House, Oshkosh, Wisconsin, NRHP-listed in Winnebago County

== See also ==
- Meyer House (disambiguation)
- Mayer Apartments, Mayer, Arizona, NRHP-listed in Yavapai County
- Mayer Business Block, Mayer, Arizona, NRHP-listed in Yavapai County
- Mayer Red Brick Schoolhouse, Mayer, Arizona, NRHP-listed in Yavapai County
- Mayer Boot and Shoe Company Building, Milwaukee, Wisconsin, NRHP-listed in Milwaukee
