= Meyers House =

Meyers House may refer to:

- Elias Meyers House, Petoskey, Michigan
- Olcovich–Meyers House, Carson City, Nevada
- Meyers House (Hillsboro, New Mexico), in Hillsboro, New Mexico
- Capt. Meyers House, Vermilion, Ohio, listed on the NRHP in Erie County, Ohio

== See also ==
- Meyer House (disambiguation)
- Myer House (disambiguation)
- Myers House (disambiguation)
