= Myer House =

Myer House may refer to:

- Morton–Myer House, Boonville, Missouri
- Myer House (Dublin, Ohio)
- Sterling Myer House, Houston, TX, listed on the NRHP in Texas

== See also ==
- Myers House (disambiguation)
- Meyer House (disambiguation)
- Meyers House (disambiguation)
