= Irwin B. Laughlin =

American diplomat

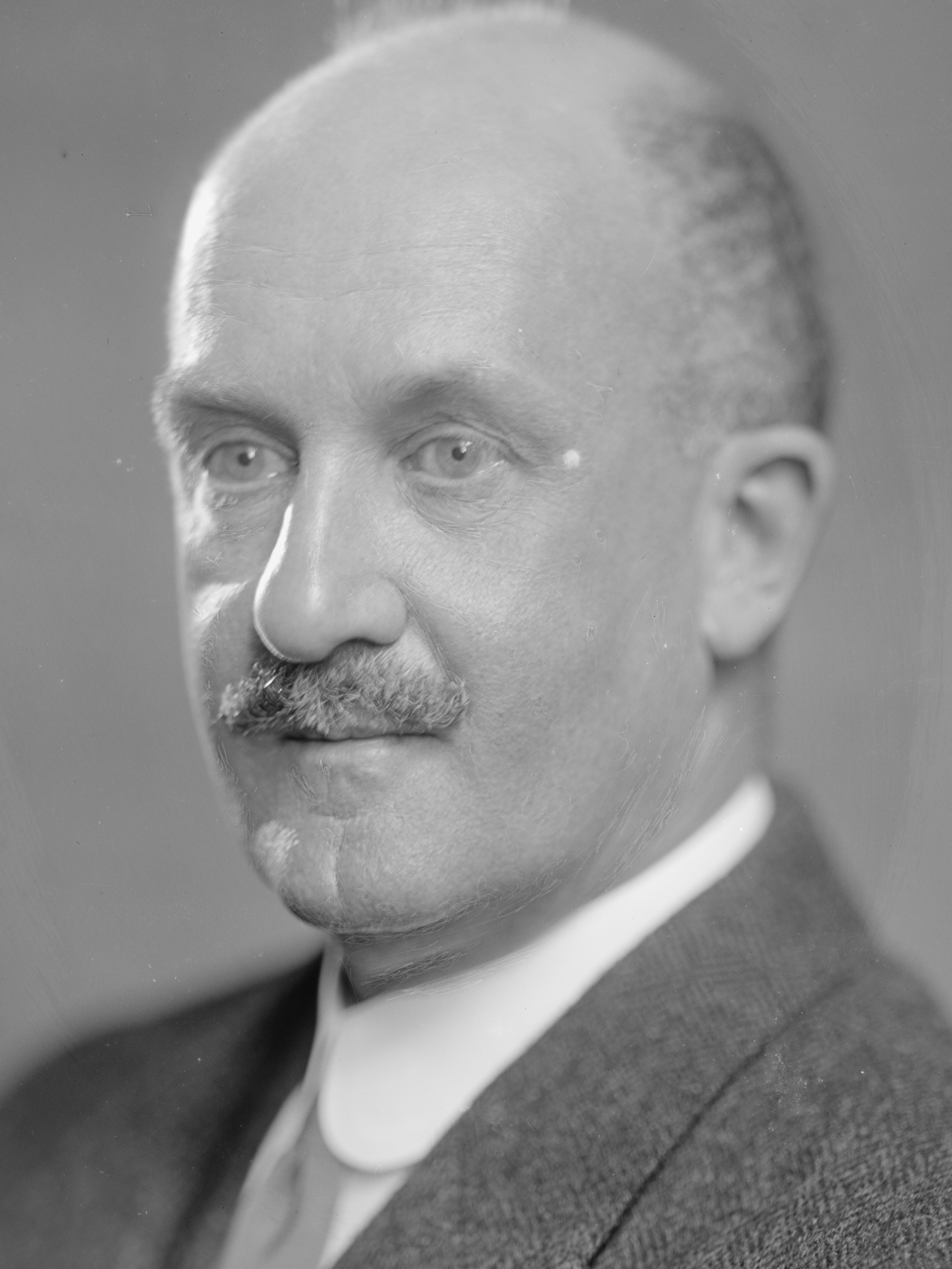

United States Ambassador to Greece
- In office 1924–1926
- President: Calvin Coolidge
- Preceded by: Edward Capps
- Succeeded by: Robert Peet Skinner

40th United States Ambassador to Spain
- In office December 24, 1929 – April 12, 1933
- President: Herbert Hoover; Franklin D. Roosevelt
- Preceded by: Ogden H. Hammond
- Succeeded by: Claude G. Bowers

Personal details
- Born: April 26, 1871 Pittsburgh, Pennsylvania
- Died: April 18, 1941 (aged 69) Washington, D.C.
- Spouse: Therese E. Iselin

Irwin Boyle Laughlin (April 26, 1871 – April 18, 1941) was an American diplomat. He served as Minister to Greece from 1924 to 1926 and Ambassador to Spain from 1929 to 1933.

== Early life ==
Laughlin was born in Pittsburgh, Pennsylvania, in 1871 to George McCully Laughlin (1842–1908) and Isabel McKennan Laughlin. His father served in the Union Army during the Civil War, participating in the campaigns of the Fifth Corps of the Army of the Potomac from Antietam to Appomattox. His paternal grandfather was James H. Laughlin, a pioneer in Pittsburgh's iron and steel industries, and his maternal grandfather was William McKennan (1816–1893), a federal judge for the Third Circuit court of appeals.

Laughlin attended St. Paul's School in Concord, New Hampshire, and Yale University, where he graduated in 1893. After graduation he entered the office of the Jones and Laughlin Steel Company, established by Benjamin Franklin Jones and his grandfather, James H. Laughlin. He was the treasurer of the company from 1900 to 1903.

== Diplomatic career ==
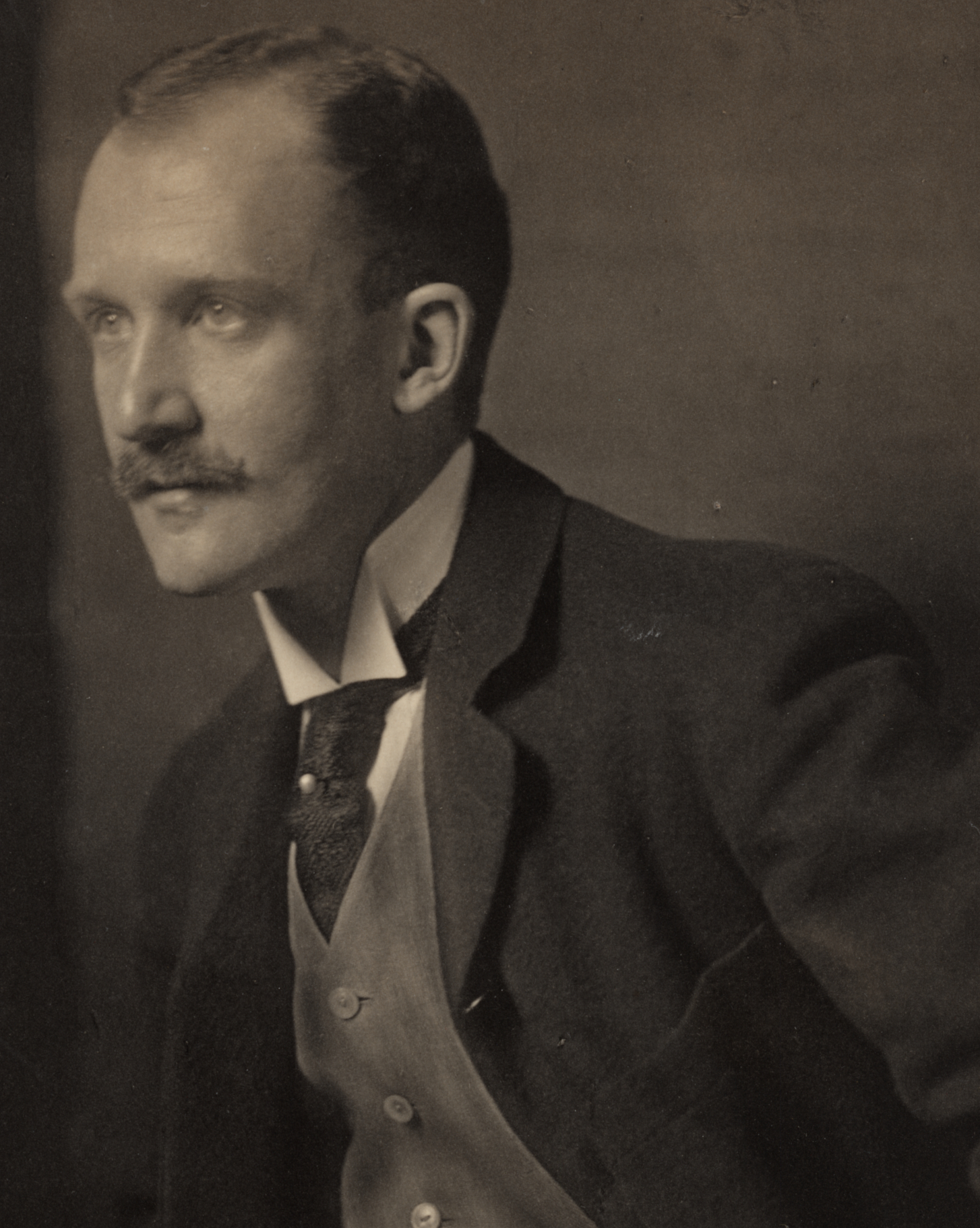
Laughlin in 1902

Laughlin left the steel industry in 1903 to pursue a career in the Foreign Service. In 1904 he became private secretary to Lloyd Carpenter Griscom, then serving as Minister to Japan. He was appointed second secretary to the American legation in Tokyo in 1905, during the Russo-Japanese War.

In 1906, he was secretary to the American legation in Bangkok and Consul General of Siam. He was second secretary to the American legation in Peking in 1907, and then served in a similar capacity in Saint Petersburg, Athens, Montenegro, and Paris.

In 1910, he served as secretary of the special envoy to the Sultan of Turkey. He was secretary to the Embassy in Berlin and chargé d'affaires in 1911. He was secretary of the Embassy in London from 1912 to 1917 and counselor of the embassy from 1916 to 1919.

Laughlin then took an extended leave of absence from the Foreign Service in 1919, during which time he built the Meridian House at 1630 Crescent Place in Washington, D.C., on land he had purchased in 1912. He filled the house with his collection of 18th century French drawings and Oriental porcelains and screens.

He returned to diplomacy in 1921 as secretary to Senator Henry Cabot Lodge at the Washington Naval Conference. In 1924, President Calvin Coolidge appointed him Envoy Extraordinary and Minister Plenipotentiary to Greece, a position he held for two years. President Herbert Hoover appointed him Ambassador to Spain in 1929, and he served until 1933.

During Laughlin's ambassadorship to Spain, King Alfonso XIII left the country and the Second Spanish Republic was established. When the proclamation of the Republic was issued on April 14, 1931, Laughlin, who had supported Alfonso XIII's efforts to institute a constitutional monarchy, reacted cautiously. He advised Secretary of State Henry L. Stimson against extending formal recognition to the Republic. Stimson ultimately recognized the provisional government after Great Britain had done so but was careful not to use the term "Spanish Republic" and stated that the U.S. government did not "wish to give the appearance of prejudging events."

== Family and later life ==
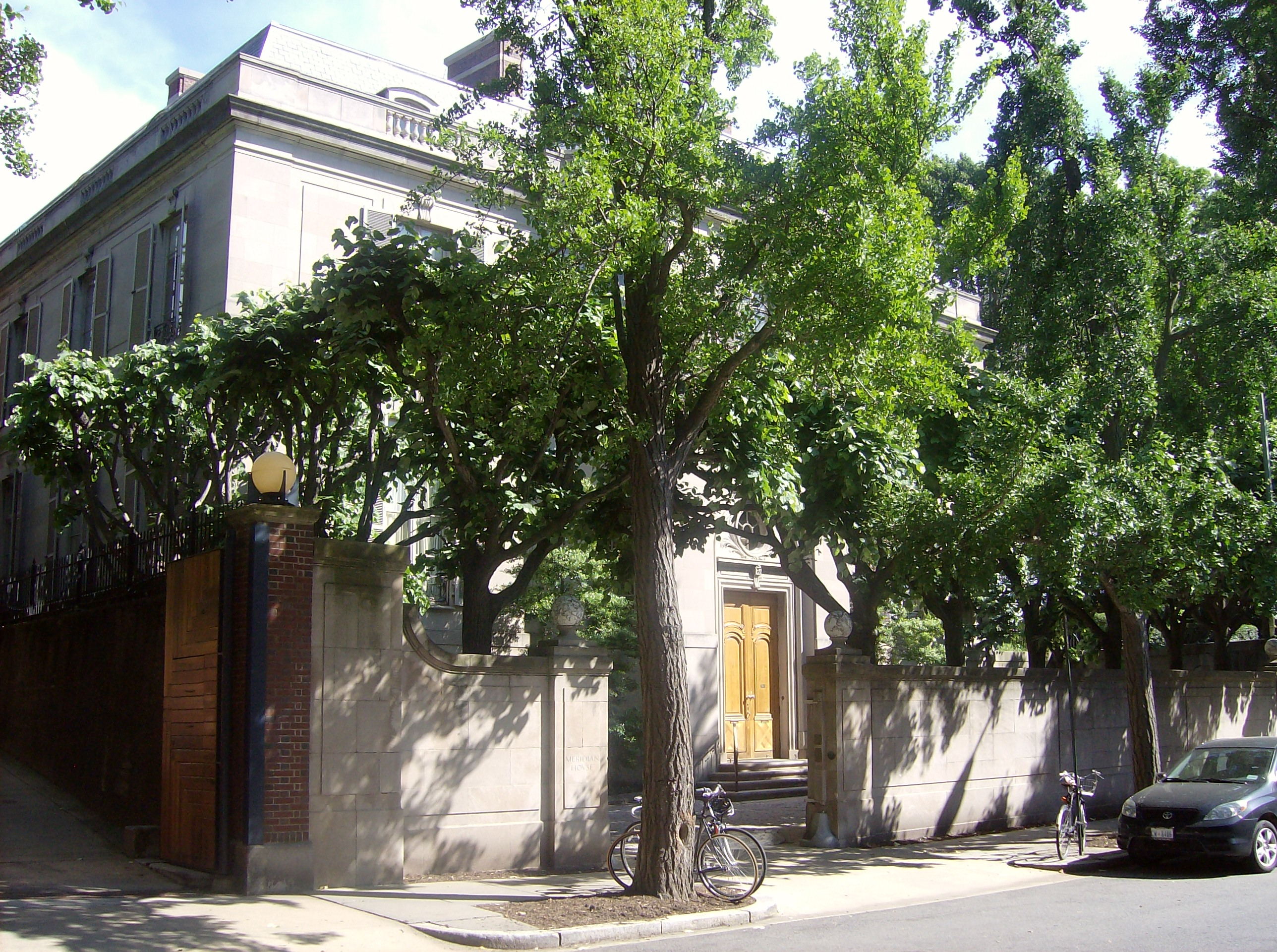
Meridian House

On September 18, 1912, Laughlin married Therese E. Iselin, daughter of New York banker Adrian Iselin Jr. They had two children, Alexander Laughlin and Gertrude Laughlin. Gertrude married Rear Admiral Hubert Winthrop Chanler. Laughlin died in 1941 at his home in Washington D.C. at the age of 69.

Diplomatic posts
Preceded by Edward Capps	United States Ambassador to Greece; 1924–1926	Succeeded by Robert P. Skinner
Preceded by Ogden H. Hammond	United States Ambassador to Spain; 1929–1933	Succeeded by Claude Bowers
