= Alexander Moore (diplomat) =

American diplomat (1867–1930)

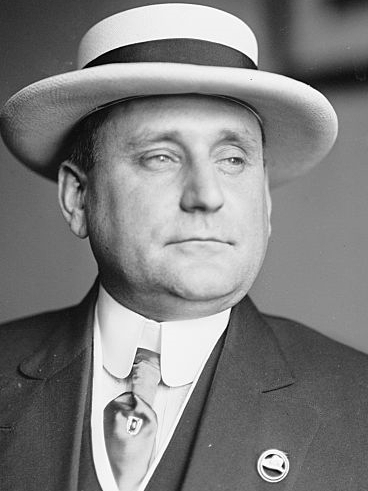
- Moore in 1912

United States Ambassador to Peru
- In office June 11, 1928 – July 10, 1929
- President: Calvin Coolidge; Herbert Hoover
- Preceded by: Miles Poindexter
- Succeeded by: Fred Morris Dearing

38th United States Ambassador to Spain
- In office May 16, 1923 – December 20, 1925
- President: Warren G. Harding; Calvin Coolidge
- Preceded by: Cyrus Woods
- Succeeded by: Ogden H. Hammond

Personal details
- Born: Alexander Pollock Moore; November 10, 1867 Pittsburgh, Pennsylvania, U.S.
- Died: February 17, 1930 (aged 62) Los Angeles, California U.S.
- Resting place: Allegheny Cemetery
- Party: Republican
- Spouse: Lillian Russell (m. 1912; died 1922)
- Parents: George K Moore; Anne Jane Phillips
- Relatives: John Phillips Moore (brother)

Alexander Pollock Moore (November 10, 1867 – February 17, 1930) was an American diplomat, editor and publisher.

== Biography ==
Born in Pittsburgh on November 10, 1867, Moore was the publisher/owner of the Pittsburgh Leader when he married the stage actress Lillian Russell, becoming her fourth husband in 1912.

He was a delegate to the Republican National Convention from Pennsylvania in 1916.

After his wife died on June 6, 1922, Moore served as an ambassador twice: to Spain from 1923 to 1925 and to Peru from 1928 to 1929. As the Ambassador to Peru he played a significant role in negotiating the Tacna-Arica boundary agreement, settling a border dispute between Peru and Chile.

He died on February 17, 1930, in Los Angeles, California, shortly after he was appointed ambassador to Poland by President Hoover, and was interred at the Allegheny Cemetery in Pittsburgh.

Diplomatic posts
Preceded by Cyrus E. Woods	United States Ambassador to Spain; 4 March 1923–20 December 1925	Succeeded by Ogden H. Hammond
Preceded by Miles Poindexter	United States Ambassador to Peru; 11 June 1928–10 July 1929	Succeeded by Fred Morris Dearing
