= Ogden H. Hammond =

American businessman, politician and diplomat

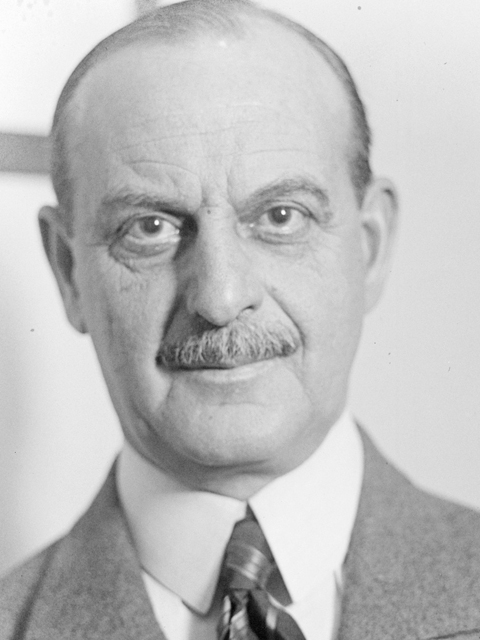

39th United States Ambassador to Spain
- In office December 21, 1925 – October 13, 1929
- President: Calvin Coolidge; Herbert Hoover
- Preceded by: Alexander P. Moore
- Succeeded by: Irwin B. Laughlin

Member of the New Jersey General Assembly
- In office 1914–1915

Personal details
- Born: Ogden Haggerty Hammond; October 13, 1869 Louisville, Kentucky
- Died: October 29, 1956 (aged 87) Manhattan, New York
- Party: Republican
- Spouses: Mary Picton Stevens; Marguerite McClure Howland
- Children: 3, including Millicent Fenwick
- Relatives: John Hammond (nephew)
- Education: Phillips Exeter Academy
- Alma mater: Yale University

Ogden Haggerty Hammond (October 13, 1869 – October 29, 1956) was an American businessman, politician and diplomat who served as United States Ambassador to Spain from 1925 to 1929. He was the father of Millicent Fenwick, a four-term Republican member of the United States House of Representatives from New Jersey.

== Early life ==
Hammond was born in 1869 in Louisville, Kentucky, the son of John Henry Hammond and Sophia Vernon Wolfe. During the Civil War his father served as chief of staff to General William Tecumseh Sherman before becoming a general himself. His brother, John Henry Hammond Jr., married Emily Vanderbilt Sloane, granddaughter of William Henry Vanderbilt, and was the father of John H. Hammond II (1910–1987).

The Hammond family moved to Chicago, Illinois when he was four, and then to Saint Paul, Minnesota and Superior, Wisconsin. He attended Phillips Exeter Academy and graduated from Yale University in 1893.

== Career ==
After graduating from Yale, he returned to Superior where he served as a member of the Board of Aldermen for two years.

Hammond worked as an insurance broker, then moved into real estate, becoming president of the Broadway Improvement Company and the Hoboken Terminal Railway Company, as well as vice-president of the Hoboken Land and Improvement Company, owned by his in-laws, the Stevenses. Ogden became involved in local Republican politics, serving on the Bernardsville Township Committee from 1912 to 1914. He was elected to a one-year term in the New Jersey General Assembly in 1914 and was re-elected the following year. He later served as delegate to the 1916 Republican National Convention and as treasurer of the New Jersey Republican State Committee.

=== RMS Lusitania ===
On May 1, 1915, Hammond and his wife Mary boarded the British ocean liner RMS Lusitania in New York, en route to Liverpool. Mary intended to help victims of World War I and assist the Red Cross in establishing a hospital in France. The Lusitania was torpedoed by a German U-boat on May 7, and in the aftermath Ogden survived the sinking and Mary did not. He established the Mary Stevens Hammond Memorial Home for Destitute Children in Hoboken in her honor.

=== Diplomatic career and later years ===
In 1925, Calvin Coolidge appointed Hammond to be United States Ambassador to Spain. He served until 1929, when Herbert Hoover appointed the new ambassador, Irwin B. Laughlin. The Spanish Royal Court awarded him the Order of Isabella the Catholic for his public service.

In 1931, Hammond was named president and a director of the First National Bank of Hoboken. He became vice president and director of the First National Bank of Jersey City in 1934, retiring in 1950.

== Personal life ==
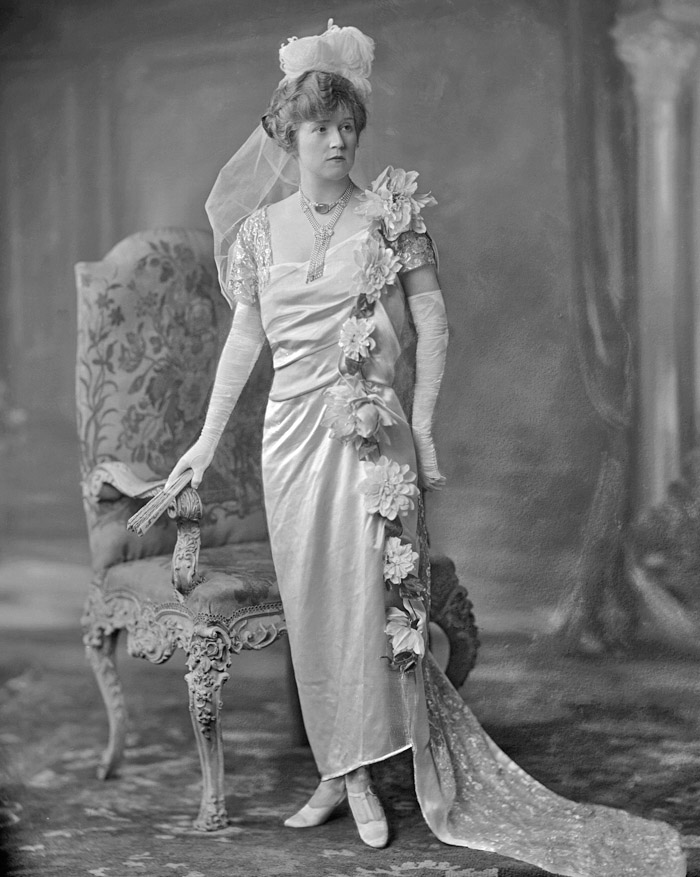
Photograph of his second wife, Daisy, 22 June 1922

On a visit to Bernardsville, Hammond met Mary Picton Stevens (1885–1915). They were married in Hoboken on April 8, 1907, their marriage lasting up until Mary's death in the sinking of the Lusitania. Mary was the daughter of John Stevens (oldest son of Stevens Institute of Technology founder Edwin Augustus Stevens and grandson of inventor John Stevens), and Mary Marshall (née McGuire) Stevens. The Hammonds settled in a forty-seven-room mansion in Bernardsville in 1908. Hammond and his first wife had three children:

- Mary Stevens Hammond (1908–1958), who married Count Guerino Roberti and was thereafter known as Countess Roberti.
- Millicent Vernon Hammond (1910–1992), who served in the U.S. House of Representatives and married Hugh McLeod Fenwick (1905–1991) in 1931.
- Ogden H. Hammond Jr. (1912–1976), who married Marsyl Stokes.

On December 18, 1917, Hammond remarried, to Marguerite "Daisy" (née McClure) Howland (1876–1969), the daughter of New York attorney David McClure and the widow of Dulany Howland. Her son, McClure "Mac" Meredith Howland (1906–1985), became Hammond's stepson.

Hammond died in 1956 at his home in Manhattan at the age of 87.

=== Descendants ===
Through his daughter Millicent, he was the grandfather of Mary Stevens Fenwick (1934–1987) and Hugh Hammond Fenwick (1937–2002).

Through his son Ogden, he was the grandfather of Edythe (née Hammond) Lurie and Madeline (née Hammond) Ilah Alatas of Riyadh, Saudi Arabia, and Dr. Ogden H. Hammond Jr., a professor at the Massachusetts Institute of Technology.

Diplomatic posts
Preceded by Alexander P. Moore	United States Ambassador to Spain; 1925–1929	Succeeded by Irwin B. Laughlin
