= Meridian House =

Historic house in Washington, D.C., United States

- U.S. National Register of Historic Places
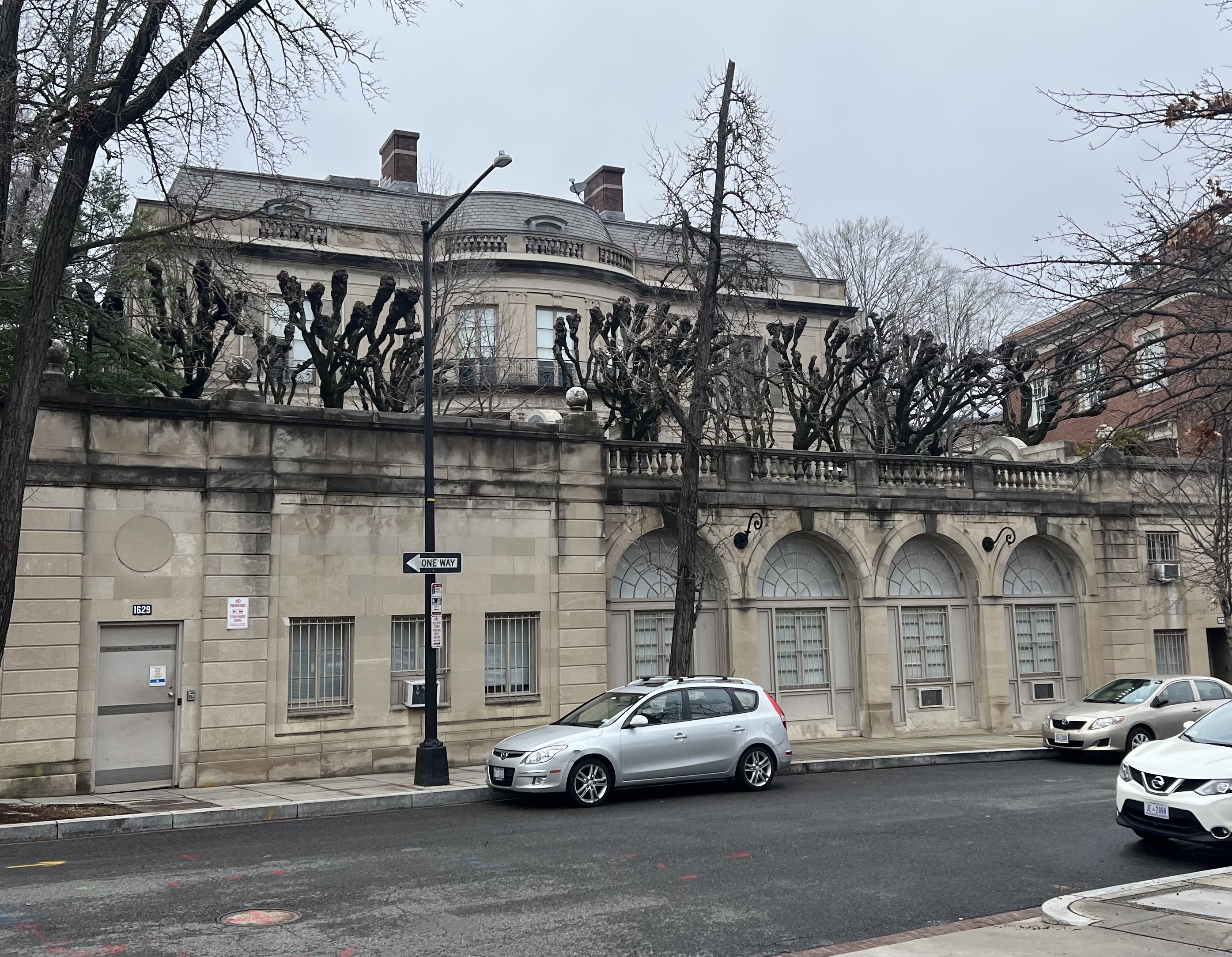
- Meridian House from Belmont St.
- Location: 1630 Crescent Pl. NW; Washington, D.C.
- Coordinates: 38°55′12.72″N 77°2′17.52″W
- Built: 1923
- Architect: John Russell Pope
- Architectural style: Beaux Arts
- NRHP reference No.: 73002101
- Added to NRHP: May 8, 1973

Meridian House is a historic mansion in Washington, D.C., located in the Meridian Hill neighborhood of Northwest D.C. It was designed by American architect John Russell Pope and built in 1920 for Ambassador Irwin B. Laughlin, who filled it with his extensive collection of French paintings and Oriental porcelain. It stayed in the Laughlin family until 1960, when it was purchased by the non-profit Meridian International Center.

== History ==
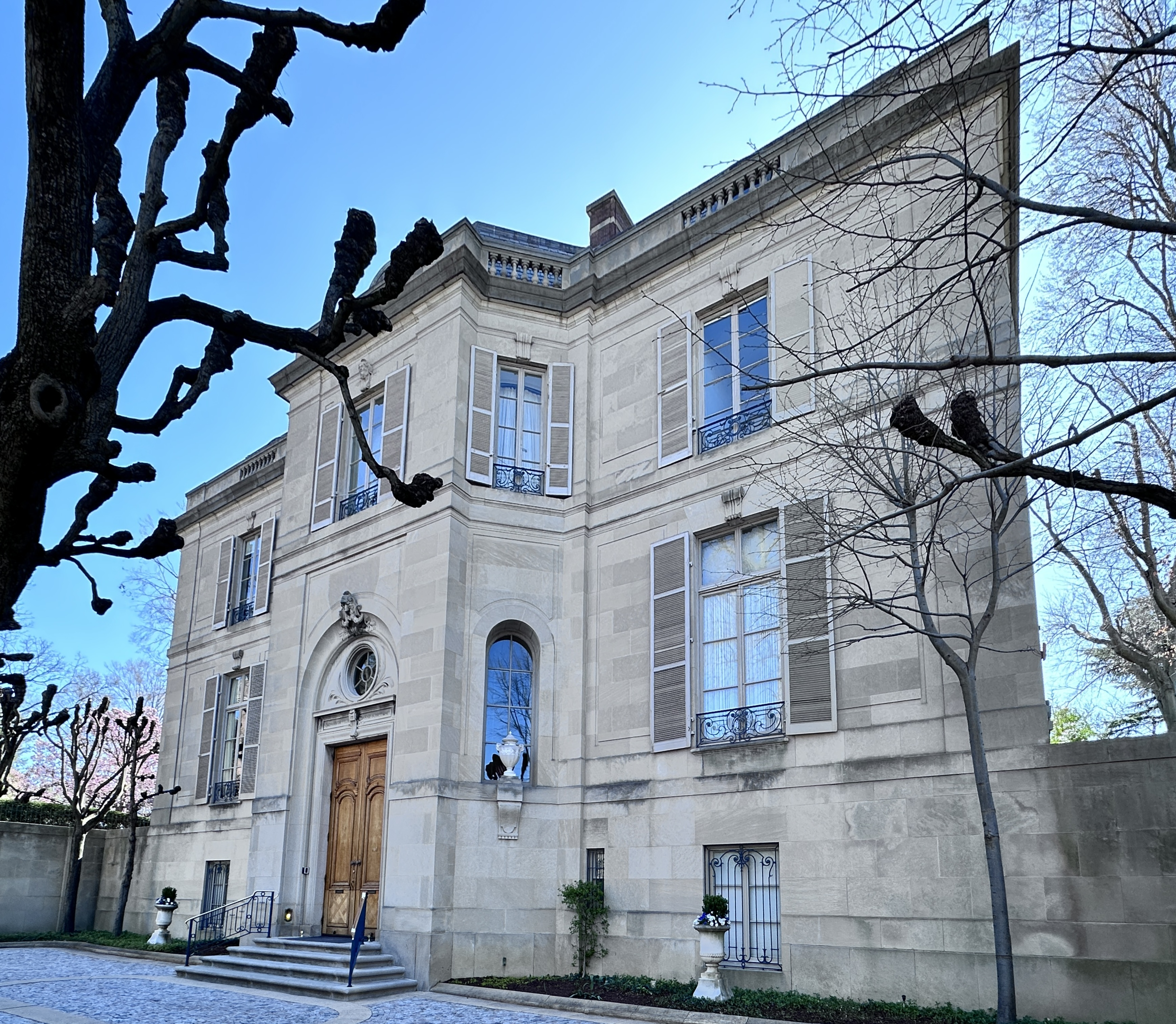
Meridian House in 2025

Meridian House was built by American diplomat Irwin B. Laughlin. He purchased the land in 1912, two years after his friend Henry White bought the adjacent site at 1624 Crescent Place. After a long career with the US Foreign Service, Laughlin retired in 1919 and built Meridian House, filling it with his collection of 18th-century French drawings and Oriental porcelains and screens. Although he later returned to the diplomatic corps, serving as Ambassador to Greece and Spain in the 1920s and '30s, Laughlin also played an active role in Washington's artistic and historical communities.

Ambassador Laughlin was married to Therese Iselin, daughter of New York City banker Adrian Iselin Jr. Their daughter, Gertrude, who married Rear Admiral Hubert Winthrop Chanler, lived in Meridian House during her youth and from time to time after her marriage, especially when her husband was away on naval assignments. The house remained in the Laughlin family until 1958.

In 1960, a newly created non-profit organization dedicated to promoting international understanding, which later became Meridian International Center, received a grant from the Ford Foundation to purchase Meridian House. Gertrude Laughlin Chanler served as a Meridian trustee for many years and made a substantial donation to start Meridian's endowment. Her children continue to support Meridian International Center and frequently visit the house with their own children.

== The House ==
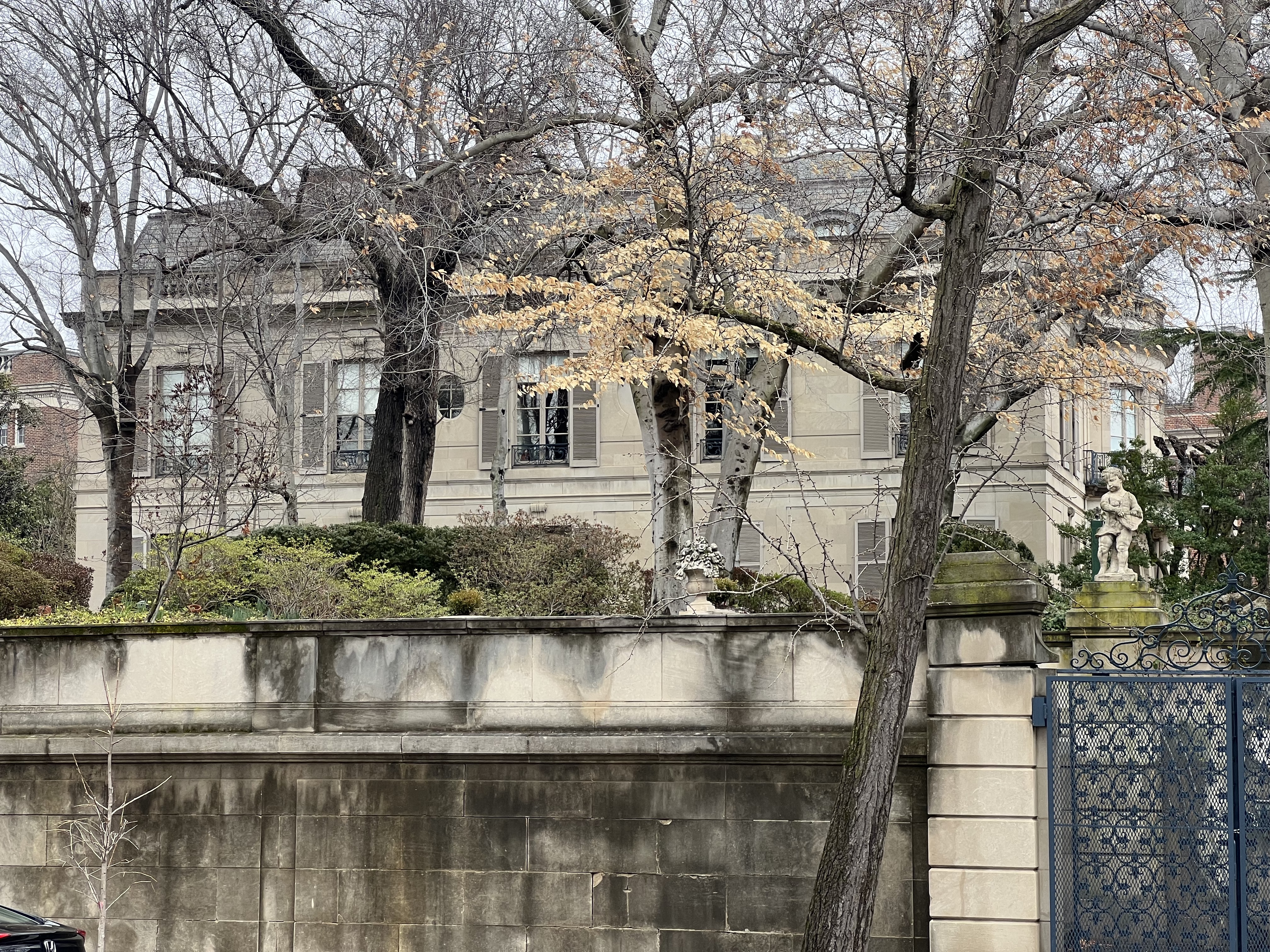
View from 17th St.

=== Architecture ===
In 1929, Meridian House was described by Architectural Forum as,

Perhaps as fine a piece of work of its kind as this country can show ... Certainly the manner of this house has not in this country been better done, not only in terms of stylistic authenticity, but in terms of pure architecture, meaning good taste in selectivity, in elimination, in execution. It cannot from its nature do otherwise than set a standard which should endure permanently.

After undergoing a major renovation in 1994, Meridian House's principal rooms retain their architectural detail as well as some of the original decorative features, such as the 18th-century European overdoor paintings and antique brass hardware and lighting fixtures. The classical symmetry of the Louis XVI style is reflected throughout the house.

=== Dining room ===
The dining room features a beautiful Mortlake tapestry, which has been dated by experts as late 17th century. The tapestry, purchased by the Laughlin family in England at the turn of the century, depicts the legendary reception given Alexander the Great by the Greek philosopher Diogenes. An almost identical tapestry hangs in Holyrood Palace in Edinburgh, Scotland.

The dining room also features two portraits - one of Ambassador Laughlin and one of his daughter, Gertrude Laughlin Chanler, as a child. A portrait of Mrs. Laughlin hangs nearby in the Chairmen's Study. All three were painted by Philip de László, the renowned portrait artist of the early 20th century.

=== Reception ===
The reception gallery remains much as it was at the time the Laughlin family occupied the house. The wrought-iron and marble-topped side tables, the four Waterford crystal torcheres in the corners, the blue Chinese temple jars, and the antique clock and barometer on the mirrored walls are all part of the original furnishings.

The loggia, which links the major reception rooms and rear garden, includes four marble busts sculpted in France, representing the four seasons.

A Latin inscription, "Quo habitat felicitas nil intret mali", appears over the front door and translates "Where happiness dwells, evil will not enter." Another inscription, over the rear courtyard doors, reads: "Purior hic aer: late hinc conspectus in urbem," meaning "Purer here the air whence we overlook the city," a quotation also inscribed on a house at the top of Rome's Spanish Steps.

=== Gardens ===
The rear and side gardens largely retain their original design. The pebbled courtyard has 40 linden trees, imported from Europe when the house was built. The statues throughout the garden are original to the house, as are the statues at the four roof-line corners.

== See also ==
- Irwin Boyle Laughlin
- John Russell Pope
- Meridian International Center
- White-Meyer House
