= Frederick A.E. Meyer House =

Historic house in Salt Lake City, Utah, U.S.

- Frederick A. E. Meyer House
- U.S. National Register of Historic Places
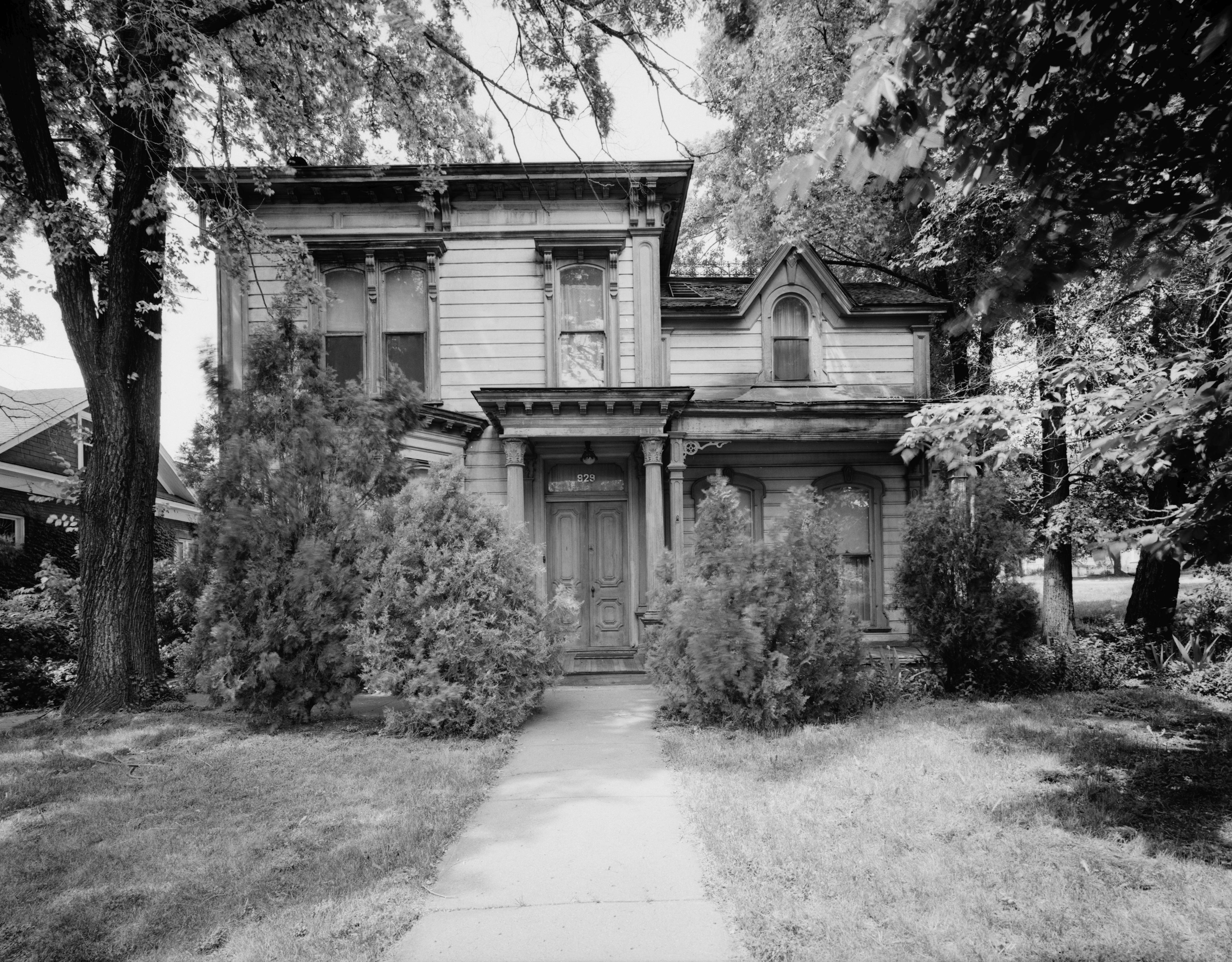

- Location within Utah Location within the United States
- Location: 929 East 200 South, Salt Lake City, Utah
- Coordinates: 40°45′55″N 111°51′49″W
- Area: less than one acre
- Built: 1873
- Architect: Dean; Anderson, H. H.
- Architectural style: Italianate
- NRHP reference No.: 83003174
- Added to NRHP: July 7, 1983

The Frederick A. E. Meyer House is a historic house located at 929 East 200 South in Salt Lake City, Utah.

== Description and history ==
It is an Italianate style house that was built in 1873. Its NRHP nomination in 1983 asserted that the house was "one of the best examples of the Italianate architectural style in Utah architecture, and... the best example of the two story box type." It is one of only two wood-frame examples of the type in Salt Lake City, the other being the NRHP-listed Jonathan C. and Eliza K. Royle House.

It is listed on the National Register of Historic Places, listed as of July 7, 1983.
