= Meridian International Center =

American public diplomacy organization

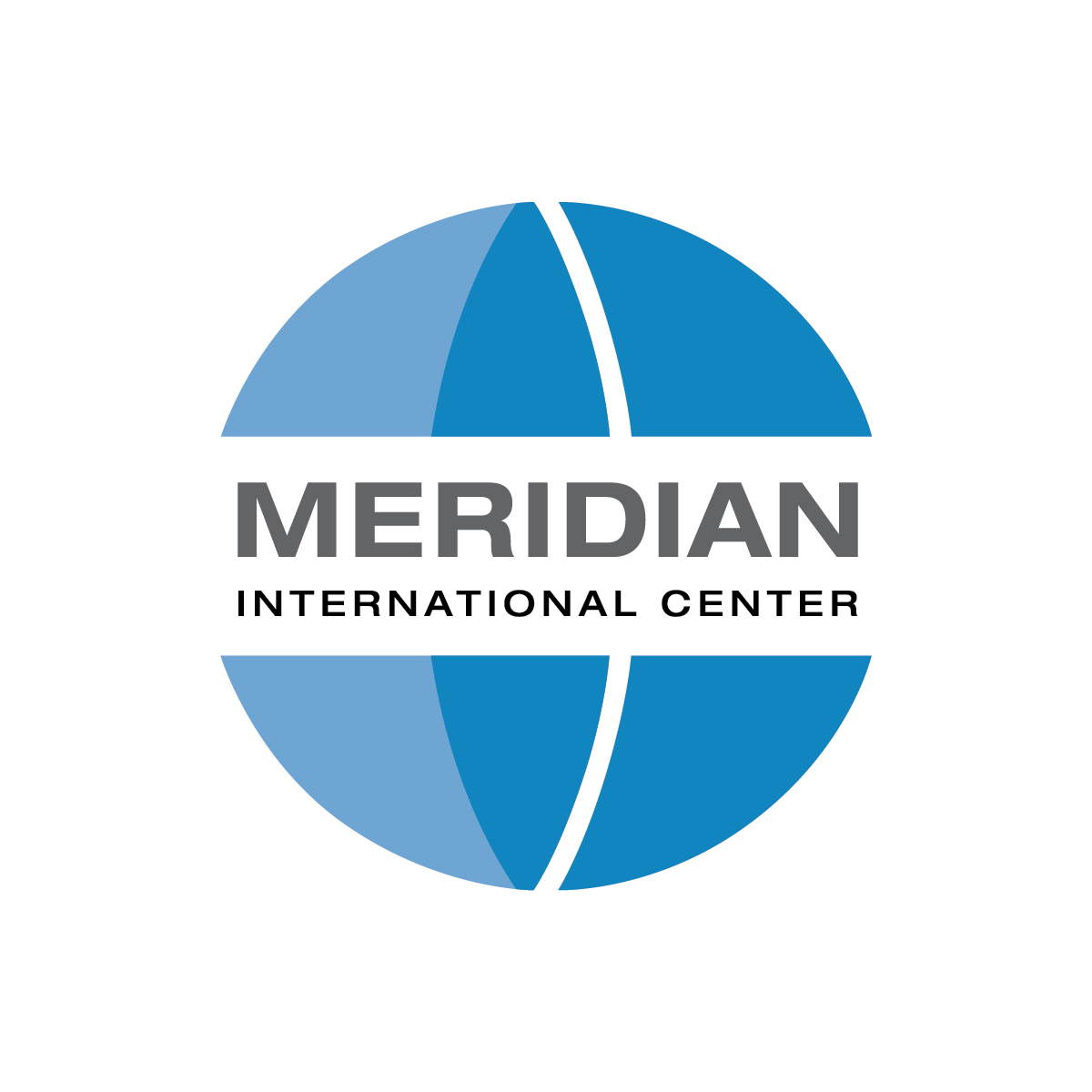
- Formation: 1960
- Headquarters: 1630 Crescent Place NW, D.C.
- Location: Washington, D.C.
- President: Stuart W. Holliday
- Website: Official website

The Meridian International Center is a non-partisan, nonprofit, public diplomacy organization founded in 1960 and located in Washington, D.C. It works closely with the U.S. Department of State and other U.S. government agencies, NGOs, international governments, and the private sector to create programs.

The organization is headquartered in the historic Meridian House and White-Meyer House, both in the Meridian Hill neighborhood and designed by John Russell Pope.

== History ==
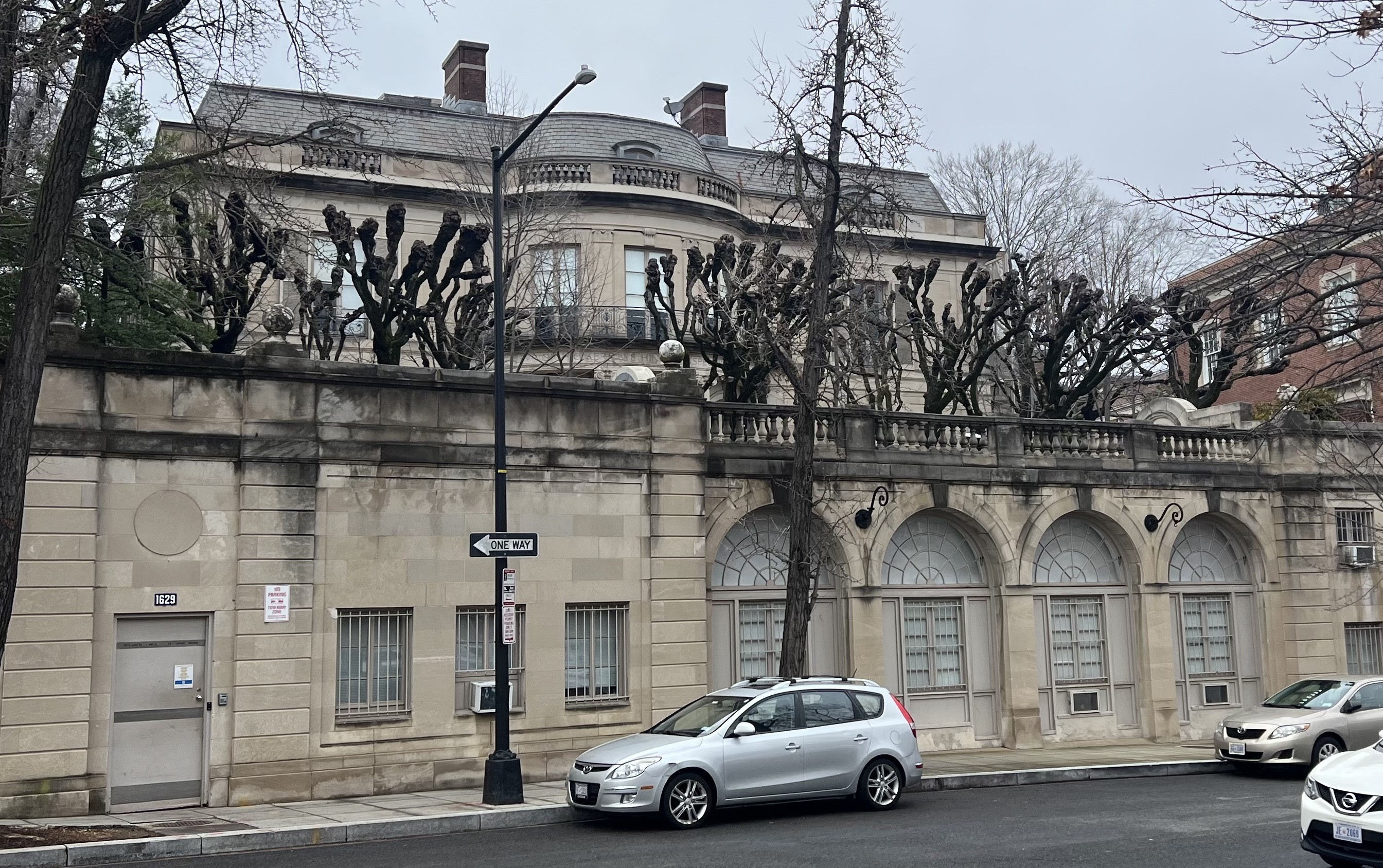
Meridian House, located in the Meridian Hill neighborhood

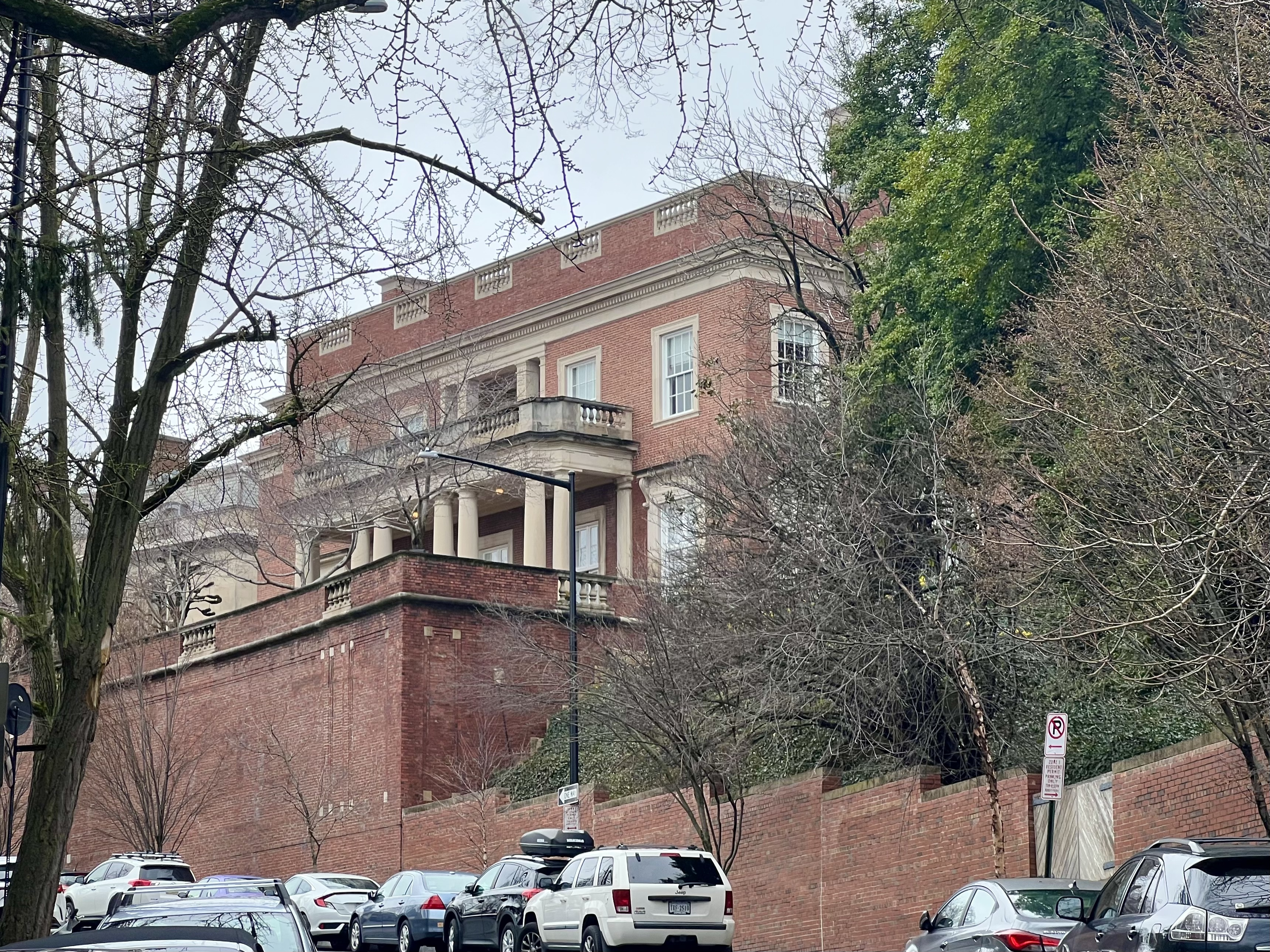
White-Meyer House, located next to Meridian House

In 1960, Dr. Arthur A. Hauck, a member of the American Council on Education and former president of the University of Maine, worked with the Ford Foundation to purchase the Meridian House from Gertrude Laughlin Chanler. The house was to serve as the headquarters of the nonprofit organization Washington International Center.

In 1961, four additional organizations joined the Center: the Foreign Student Service Council, the Governmental Affairs Institute, the Institute of Contemporary Arts, and the Institute of International Education. The American Council on Education passed the title of the Meridian House to the Meridian House Foundation.

In 1974, the Department of State approved a proposal by Meridian to take over the implementation of the International Visitor Leadership Program (IVLP) from the Governmental Affairs Institute. In 1987, Meridian acquired the White-Meyer House and grounds from the Eugene and Agnes E. Meyer Foundation.

In 1992, Meridian was renamed Meridian International Center.

== Programs ==
The Meridian House and the White-Meyer House are adjacent to each other and serve as venues for events, including corporate conferences, weddings, special events, and receptions.

== Events ==
The Center organizes several large events each year. The most prominent one is the Meridian Ball, which usually takes place in October.

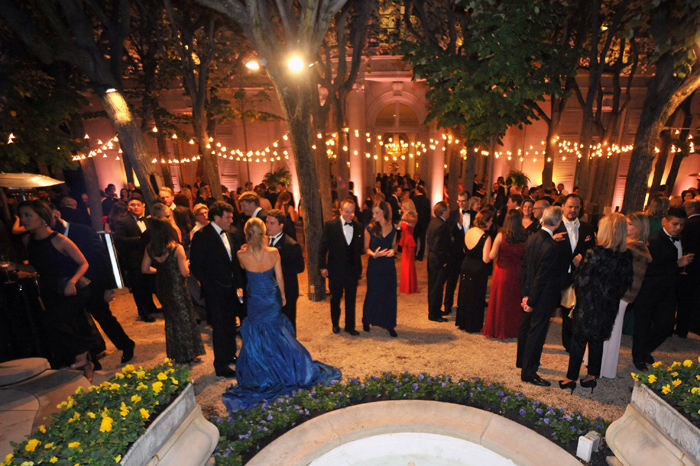
Meridian's 46th Ball

In 1969, Meridian launched an annual benefit, the Meridian Ball, with associated dinners at the embassies and residences of foreign ambassadors and Meridian’s own White-Meyer House in Washington, D.C.

== Awards ==
Meridian presents the Meridian Cultural Diplomacy Award. Its 2023 recipient was the former Meridian president and U.S. Assistant Secretary of State for Educational and Cultural Affairs (ECA), Lee Satterfield.
