= Stuart Holliday =

American business executive

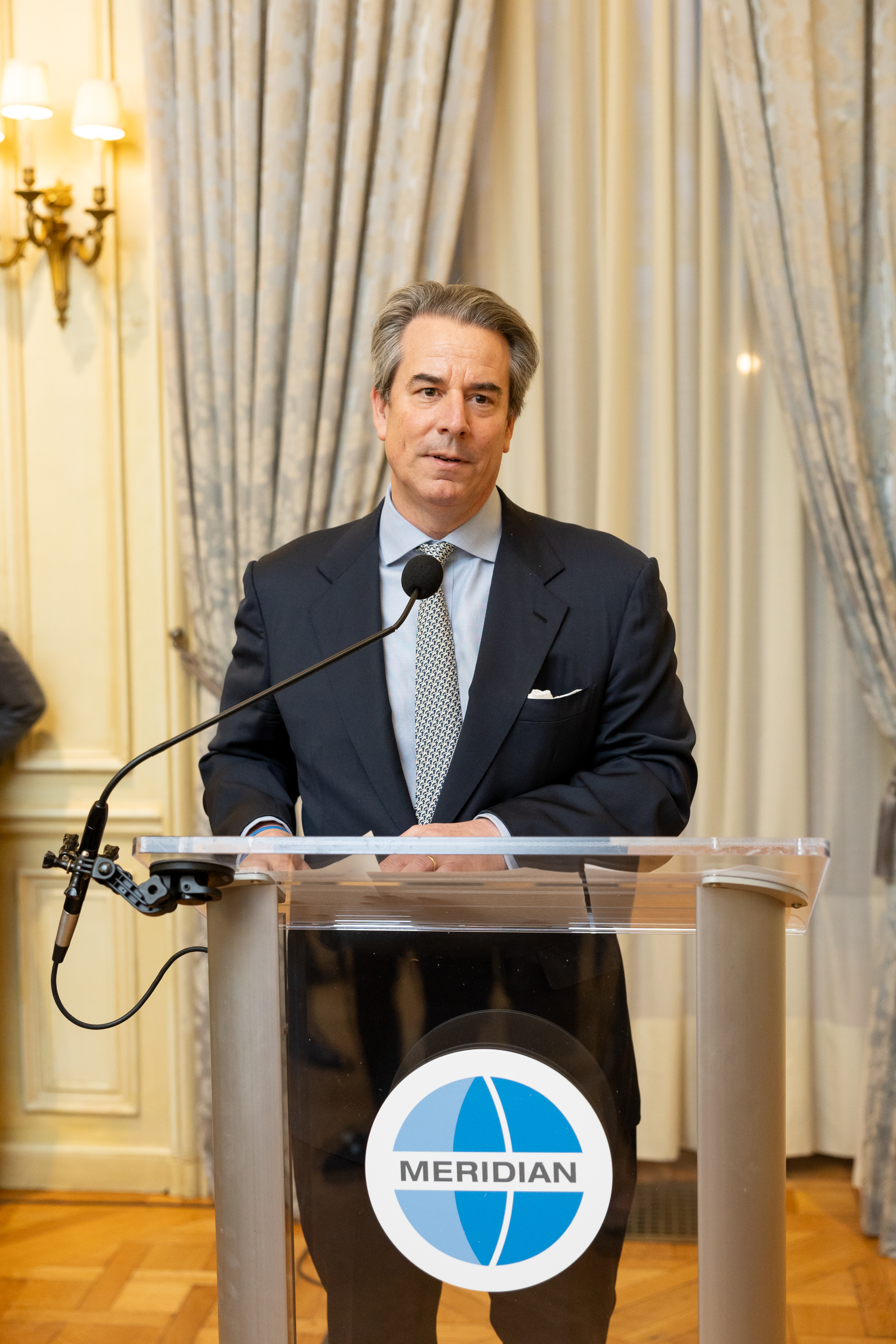
- Holliday in 2024

CEO of Meridian International Center
- Incumbent
- Assumed office 2006
- Preceded by: Walter L. Cutler

Personal details
- Born: September 7, 1965 (age 61)
- Spouse: Gwen Moore Holliday
- Education: Georgetown University, London School of Economics and Political Science
- Occupation: Nonprofit President/CEO
- Profession: International Affairs/Government
- Awards: Joint Service Commendation Medal
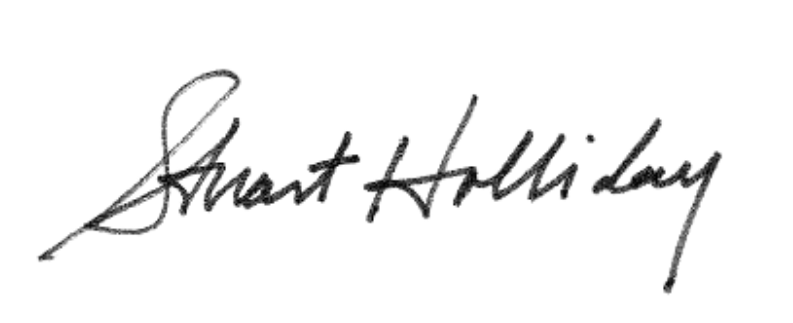
- Signature
- Website: www.meridian.org

Military service
- Allegiance: United States of America
- Branch/service: U.S. Navy
- Years of service: 1988-1995
- Battles/wars: Operation Desert Storm

Stuart W. Holliday (born September 7, 1965) is Senior Vice President and Chief Public Affairs Officer at Lockheed Martin. He leads communications and government affairs strategies and activities in coordination with the company’s international operations, advancing engagement with key policymakers and customers.

Prior to joining Lockheed Martin, Holliday was the CEO of Meridian International Center (Meridian), a nonprofit diplomacy center located in Washington, D.C. The former U.S. Ambassador for Special Political Affairs at the United Nations, Holliday engaged in diplomatic activities at Meridian, where he oversaw diplomatic exchanges between the U.S. and other countries, often collaborating with the U.S. Department of State, embassies, public and private organizations and leaders worldwide. The organization’s stated goal is to promote diplomatic engagement to overcome shared global challenges, which it achieves through a wide scope of exchange programs.

Aside from his diplomatic work, Holliday has been deeply involved in politics, having served as Special Assistant to President George W. Bush, and Associate Director of Presidential Personnel.

== Early life and education ==
Stuart Holliday was born in Blantyre, Malawi, the son of United States diplomats. His father served as the press attaché at the U.S. Embassy in France and later special assistant to Ambassador to France Sargent Shriver. After leaving Malawi, the family moved to France, where they lived in Marseille and later Paris before eventually moving to the United States.

Holliday attended Avon Old Farms School in Avon, Connecticut. He obtained a BS degree in international affairs from the School of Foreign Service at Georgetown University and subsequently an MS degree, also in international affairs, from the London School of Economics and Political Science.

== Early career ==
Holliday joined the United States Navy in 1988, serving as an Officer until 1995 on active and reserve duty. He served in Operation Desert Storm, for which he received the Joint Service Commendation Medal.

Holliday began his political career while he was serving as a reservist in the Navy. During President George H. W. Bush’s term, Holliday worked on presidential advance, supporting presidential travel and events. Later, during the 1992 election, Holliday joined the president’s re-election bid, where he worked under John McCain, who was chair of veterans for the Bush campaign.

From 1993 to 1995, Holliday was Regional Director for North Africa, the Middle East and Turkey at the International Republican Institute. In 1996, he joined the Dallas Council on World Affairs as its executive director, a role he held into 1997. From 1998 to 2000, he was the Assistant Policy Director in Texas for then Governor George W. Bush.

== Political and government career ==
During the first year of George W. Bush's presidency, from 2000 to 2001, Holliday served as Special Assistant to the President and subsequently Associate Director of Presidential Personnel at the White House. After the 9/11 attacks, he aided in staffing the inaugural Office of Homeland Security, which later became the Department of Homeland Security. Thereafter, he worked for the U.S Department of State, as Coordinator for International Information Programs and later Principal Deputy Assistant Secretary for Public Affairs.

After a presidential nomination and senate confirmation, Holliday became the United States Ambassador to the United Nations for Special Political Affairs in December 2003, serving in that role until 2005. His work focused primarily on the U.N. Security Council, where he represented the U.S. in discussions of peacekeeping, sanctions and counterterrorism programs.

== Post-political career ==
After his service as an ambassador, Holliday entered the nonprofit sector. In 2006, he became CEO of Meridian International Center, a role which he occupies presently. Under Holliday’s leadership, Meridian has leveraged hundreds of exchanges to strengthen U.S. diplomacy. Since the onset of Holliday’s term, Meridian has notably employed the strategy of open diplomacy. In a 2024 op-ed, Holliday described the concept as “a new decentralized approach to diplomacy,” leveraging untraditional diplomatic actors like local government and private sector leaders.

Holliday also presently serves as the board treasurer of the Blair House Foundation, a nonprofit organization that oversees the physical stewardship of the guest house where the President hosts foreign dignitaries. Holliday also engages in the management of historic properties at Meridian, which occupies two 19th-century houses designed by John Russell Pope.

On May 2, 2022, Holliday was honored with the Chevalier de la Légion d’Honneur, France's highest and oldest award, by Philippe Étienne, Ambassador of France to the U.S. The award and corresponding ceremony intended to highlight Holliday’s longstanding commitment to forging diplomatic and cultural ties between the France and the United States.

== Public and media appearances ==
Holliday frequently speaks on international issues on the public stage. He has contributed at a plethora of live events at international conferences and other convenings, both as a guest speaker and as a moderator of roundtable discussions. His appearances have included:

- Milken Institute Global Conference, where he appeared on a panel (May 2024)
- Concordia Summit, where he appeared on a panel and in an interview with Swift Hour
- Young Professional Organization (YPO) events
- Georgetown University
- The Washington Diplomat's Country Promotions Strategies Conference
- The Diplomatic Courier's Future of Jobs Global Summit
- The Meridian Global Leadership Summit, Culturefix and Diplomacy Forum
- Washington Ballet, with Gina Raimondo
- North Capital Forum

Holliday is a periodical media commenter as well, having provided perspectives in major media outlets. In July 2024, Holliday was featured in The White House 1600 Sessions, a podcast produced by the White House Historical Association, where he spoke about his work with the Blair House Foundation. A few months earlier in March 2024, Holliday appeared on CNN with Jim Acosta to discuss the gang attacks in Haiti. In 2019, Holliday’s piece entitled “Entrepreneurship Is the New Engine of Global Collaboration” was published on the news platform Entrepreneur. In late 2024, Holliday appeared on Acosta's show again to discuss conflicts in the Middle East and Ukraine.

More previously, Holliday has contributed views on Iran’s Long-term Intentions for Nuclear Negotiations (November 2013), Russia’s Strategy About Public Diplomacy (September 2013), the UN Security Council’s Response to Chemical Weapons in Syria (August 2013), Civil Protests in Turkey (June 2013), President Barack Obama’s visit to the Middle East (March 2013), Israel/Gaza Conflict (November 2012), Delicate Diplomacy in the Middle East (November 2012), and the UN’s Interventions in Libya. He has also been published by Gallup and featured in Vogue.

Holliday also produces content for Meridian, including his podcast, cultureXchanges, in which he interviews diplomatically relevant individuals, such as chef and TV personality Pati Jinich, and artists Hank Willis Thomas and Jeff Koons. Additionally, he regularly contributes written pieces to Meridian’s website, including op-eds on topics like space diplomacy, geopolitical resilience and open diplomacy.

== Personal life ==
Holliday is married to Gwen Moore Holliday and they have two sons. The couple met in Virginia during the 1992 presidential election and were notably on different sides of the aisle. Vogue covered their bipartisan relationship in 2016.
