= Pearl and Bess Meyer House =

Historic house in Illinois, United States

- U.S. National Register of Historic Places
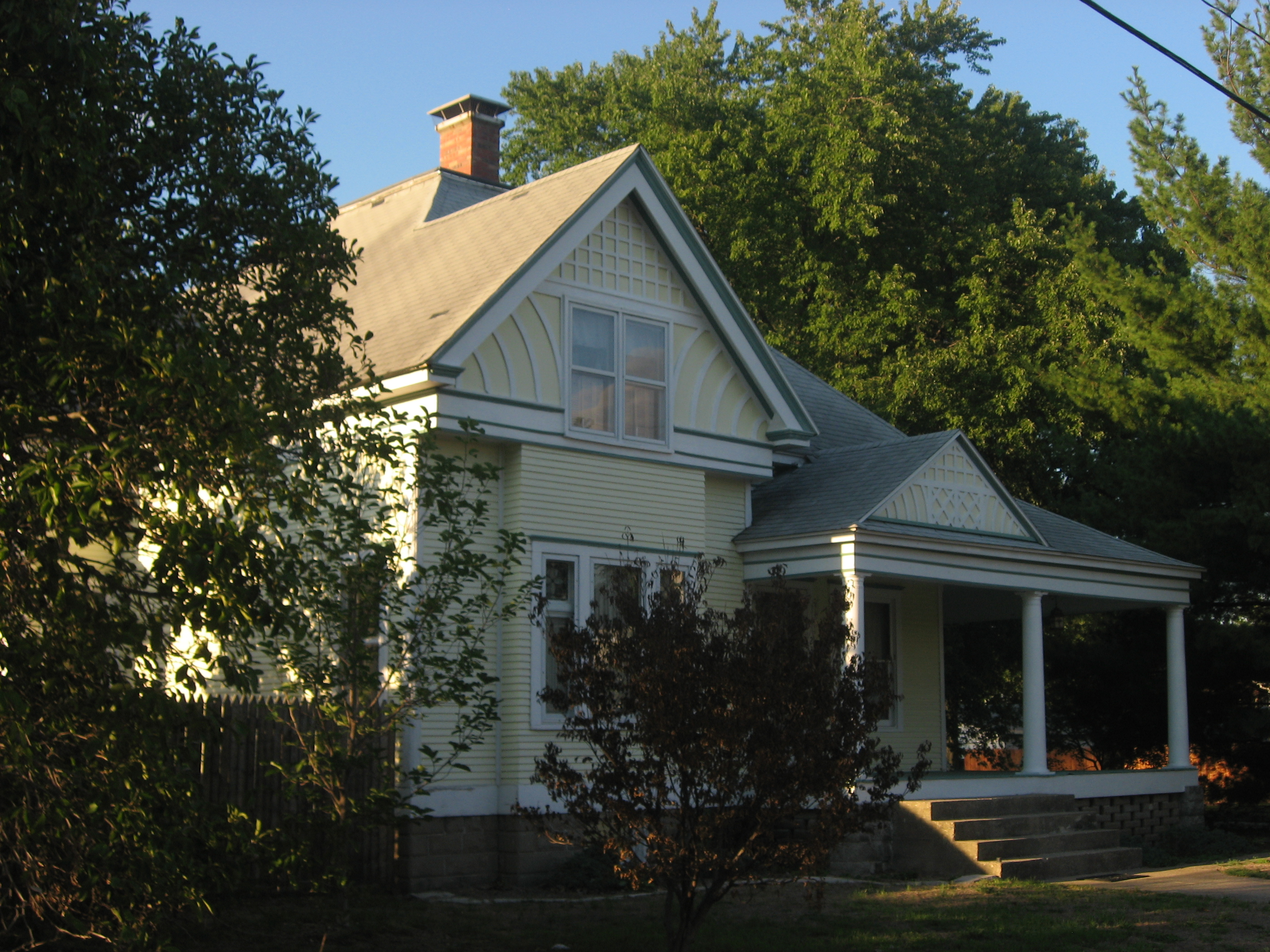

- Location within Illinois Location within the United States
- Location: 233 E. 2nd St., Flora, Illinois
- Coordinates: 38°40′14″N 88°29′2″W
- Area: less than one acre
- Built: 1912
- Built by: Nichols, Frank S.
- Architectural style: Queen Anne
- NRHP reference No.: 01000084
- Added to NRHP: February 9, 2001

The Pearl and Bess Meyer House is a historic house located at 233 E. 2nd St. in Flora, Illinois. The house was built in 1912 for Pearl Meyer, who owned a local dry goods store, and his wife Bess. Frank S. Nichols, the former mayor of Flora and contractor for the city's Baltimore and Ohio Railroad Depot, built the house in the Queen Anne style. The house's main entrance is within a wraparound front porch supported by wooden columns; the oak front doors include beveled glass panels and decorative moldings. The roof of the house features a large gable with half-timbered woodwork; a smaller half-timbered gable is located above the front entrance. The interior decorations of the house include carved oak woodwork throughout, a tiled fireplace in the living room, and stained glass windows in the library.

The house was added to the National Register of Historic Places on February 9, 2001.
