= John B. Myers House and Barn =

Historic house in Missouri, United States

- U.S. National Register of Historic Places
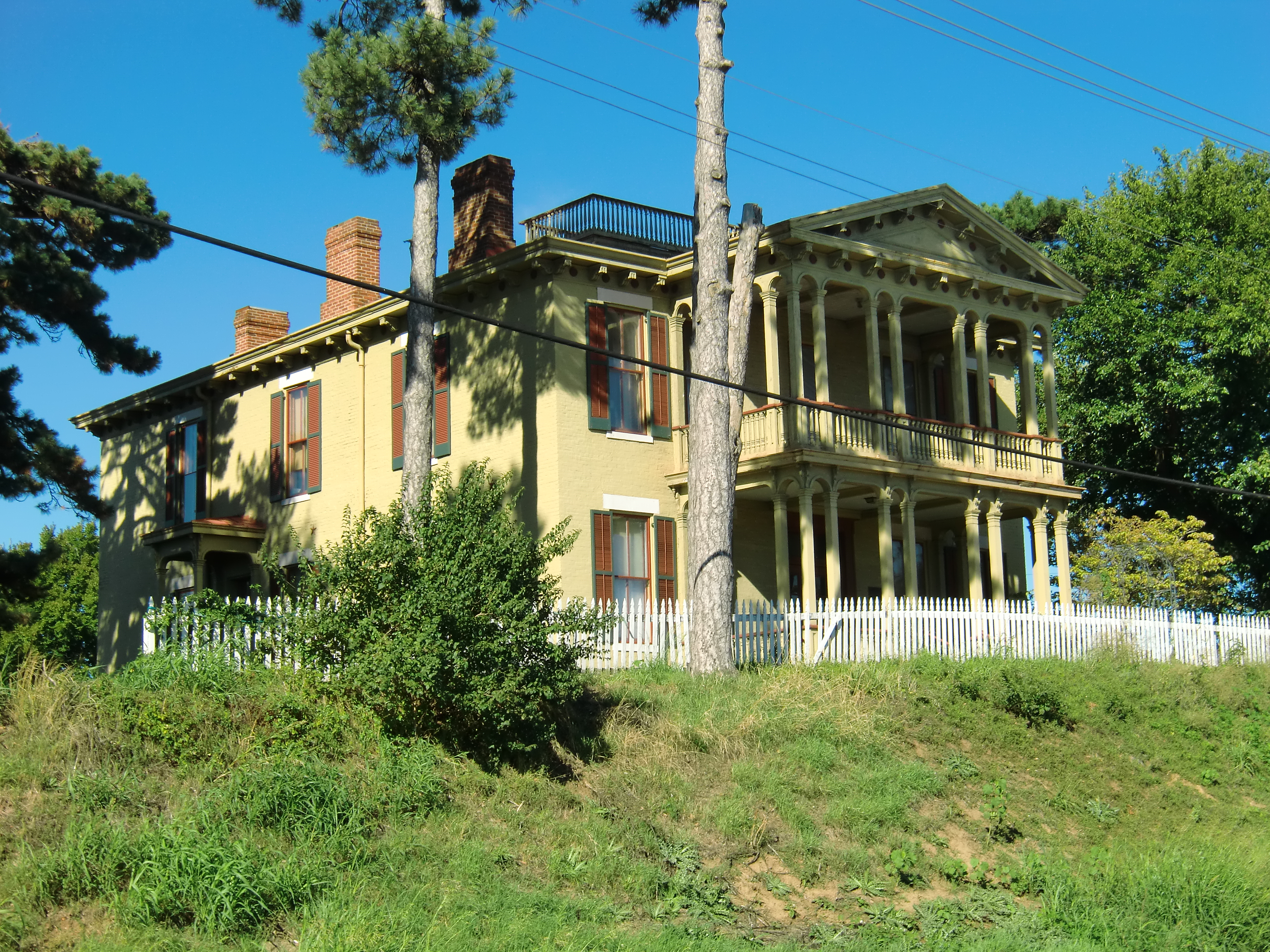

- Location within Missouri Location within the United States
- Location: 180 Dunn Rd. Florissant, Missouri
- Coordinates: 38°46′35″N 90°20′14″W
- Built: 1878 (original); 1867 (increase)
- Architectural style: Classical Revival (original)
- NRHP reference No.: 74002210 and 77001563
- Added to NRHP: December 13, 1974 (original); September 19, 1977 (increase)

John B. Myers House and Barn in Florissant, Missouri is listed on the National Register of Historic Places in Missouri. The house, a Classical Revival building built in 1878, was listed in 1974 as John B. Myers House. The listing name and boundary were increased to include the barn, built in 1867, in 1977.

The property was up for auction in 2015.
