= S. C. Mayer House =

Historic house in Ohio, United States

- U.S. National Register of Historic Places
- U.S. Historic district – Contributing property
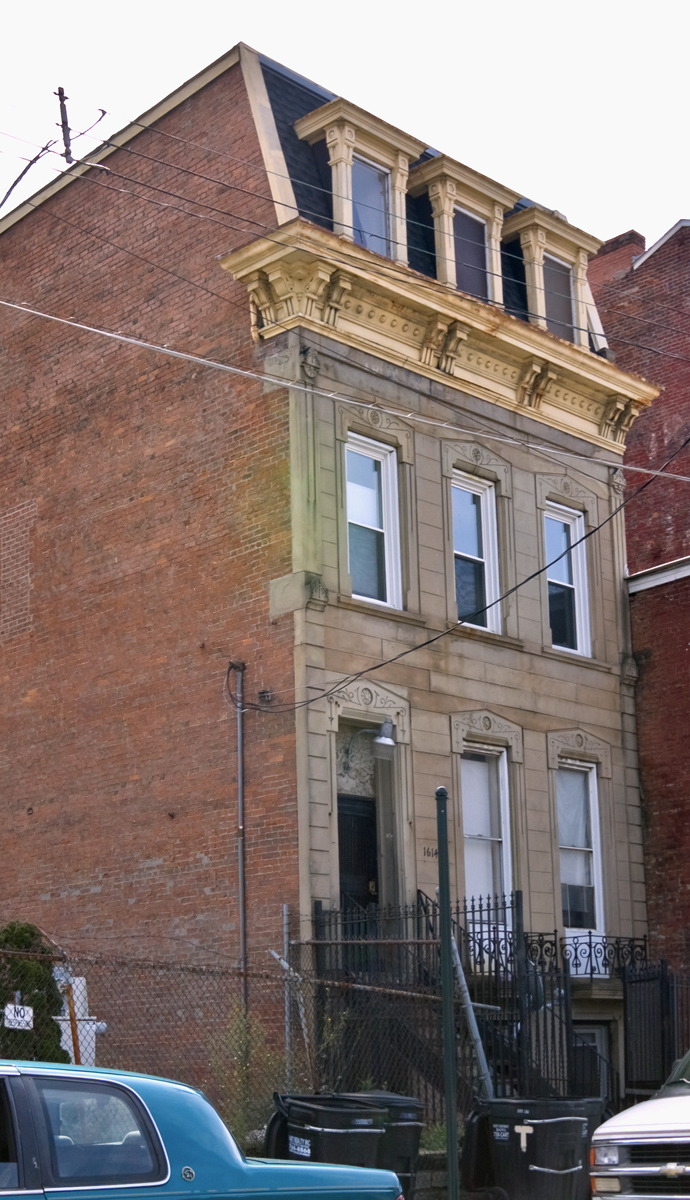
- Front and northern side

- Location within Ohio Location within the United States
- Location: 1614 Main St., Cincinnati, Ohio
- Coordinates: 39°6′47″N 84°30′44″W
- Area: Less than 1 acre (0.40 ha)
- Built: 1889
- Architect: Samuel Hannaford
- Architectural style: Second Empire
- Part of: Over-the-Rhine Historic District (ID83001985)
- MPS: Samuel Hannaford and Sons TR in Hamilton County
- NRHP reference No.: 80003063
- Added to NRHP: March 3, 1980

The S. C. Mayer House is a historic house in the Over-the-Rhine neighborhood of Cincinnati, Ohio, United States. Constructed in the late 1880s, it has been recognized because of its mix of major architectural styles and its monolithic stone walls. Built by a leading local architect, it has been named a historic site.

Set on a stone foundation, the house is built of brick and sandstone with an asbestos roof and elements of iron. The sandstone is among the house's most distinctive components, being used to cover the facade, while the ironwork includes elements such as balustrades of wrought iron around the first-story windows and the cast iron used to create the main stairway to the house. The stairway is necessary for entry because of the house's elevated design: although it stands three stories tall, the first story is elevated high above the ground, and the basement is raised high enough that it can be entered from the street. Topping the building is a steep mansard roof featuring a trio of dormer windows, which are significant contributors to the house's general plan: like the sandstone facade, the roof and windows together are a critical component of the house's appearance, and the windows help to define the facade's three bays. Although the house's overall style is clearly Second Empire, the first and second story possess obvious Italianate influences.

Constructed in 1889, the Mayer House was the work of Samuel Hannaford, one of Cincinnati's premier architects. At the time, he was near the peak of his prestige: he had become prominent in the late 1870s as the architect for the city's grand new Music Hall, and for ten years he sustained an architectural practice without partners. Having passed his fiftieth birthday, he made two of his sons partners in 1887, but he remained active for another ten years before retiring. Hannaford routinely produced buildings in many different styles, with most of his residences in the late 1880s and early 1890s being either in the Romanesque Revival style or examples of eclecticism, merging components of two or more established styles. The majority of Hannaford's surviving residences in metropolitan Cincinnati, including several built in the early 1890s, featured facades dominated by large areas of ashlar stonework, comparable to the slightly older Mayer House.

In 1980, the S. C. Mayer House was listed on the National Register of Historic Places, qualifying because of its historically significant architecture. Three years later, nearly all of Over-the-Rhine was listed on the National Register as a historic district, and the Mayer House was one of nearly 1,000 neighborhood buildings designated as contributing properties to the district.
