= Myers-Masker House =

Historic house in New Jersey, United States

- U.S. National Register of Historic Places
- New Jersey Register of Historic Places
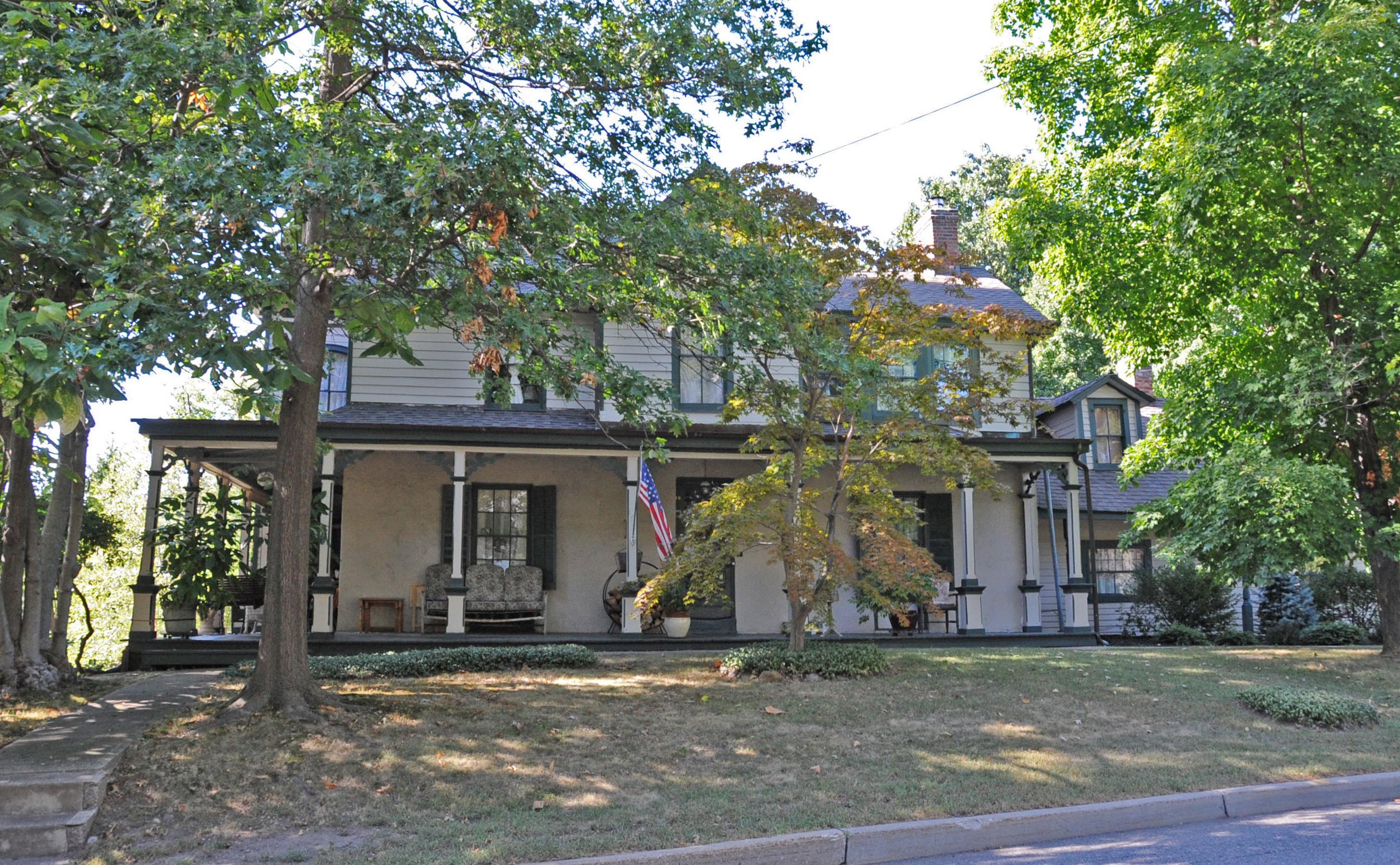

- Location within Bergen County, New Jersey Location within New Jersey Location within the United States
- Location: 179 Park Avenue, Midland Park, New Jersey
- Coordinates: 41°0′3″N 74°8′53″W
- Area: 1.6 acres (0.65 ha)
- Built: 1795
- MPS: Stone Houses of Bergen County TR
- NRHP reference No.: 83001533
- NJRHP No.: 577

Significant dates
- Added to NRHP: January 9, 1983
- Designated NJRHP: October 3, 1980

Myers-Masker House is located in Midland Park, Bergen County, New Jersey, United States. The house was built in 1795 and was added to the National Register of Historic Places on January 9, 1983.

== See also ==
- National Register of Historic Places listings in Bergen County, New Jersey
