= White-Meyer House =

Historic house in Washington, D.C., United States

- U.S. National Register of Historic Places
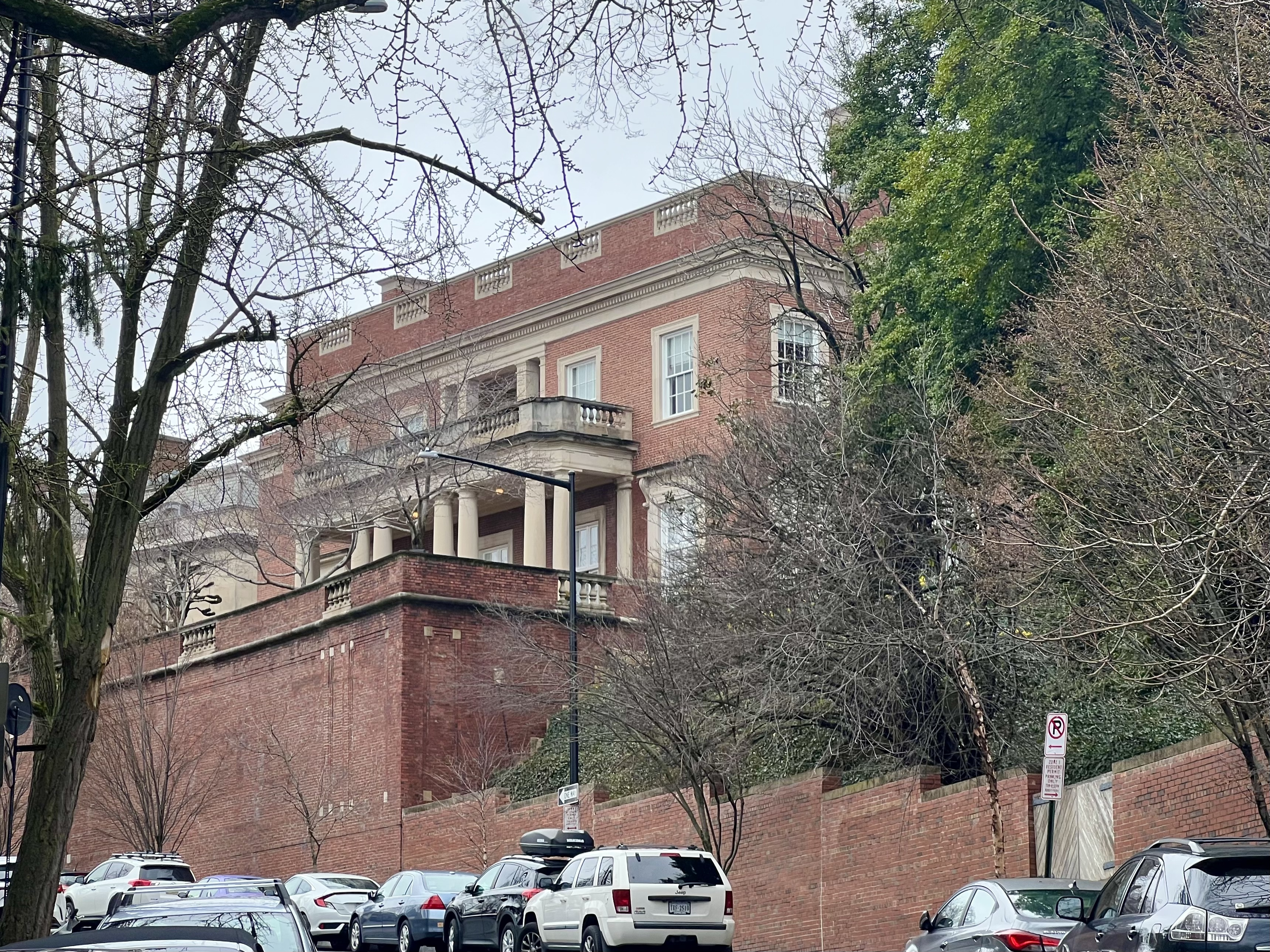

- Location within Washington, D.C.
- Location: 1624 Crescent Place, NW, Washington, District of Columbia
- Coordinates: 38°55′13″N 77°2′15″W
- Area: 1½ acres
- Built: 1912
- Architect: John Russell Pope
- NRHP reference No.: 87002293
- Added to NRHP: January 20, 1988

The White-Meyer House is a historic mansion in Washington, D.C.'s Meridian Hill neighborhood of Northwest D.C. Designed by renowned American architect John Russell Pope, the residence was originally commissioned by diplomat Henry White.

The property's notable ownership history includes

- Rental to financier/ publisher Eugene Meyer, later purchaser in 1934.
- Acquisition by the Meridian International Center nonprofit in 1987.

== History ==
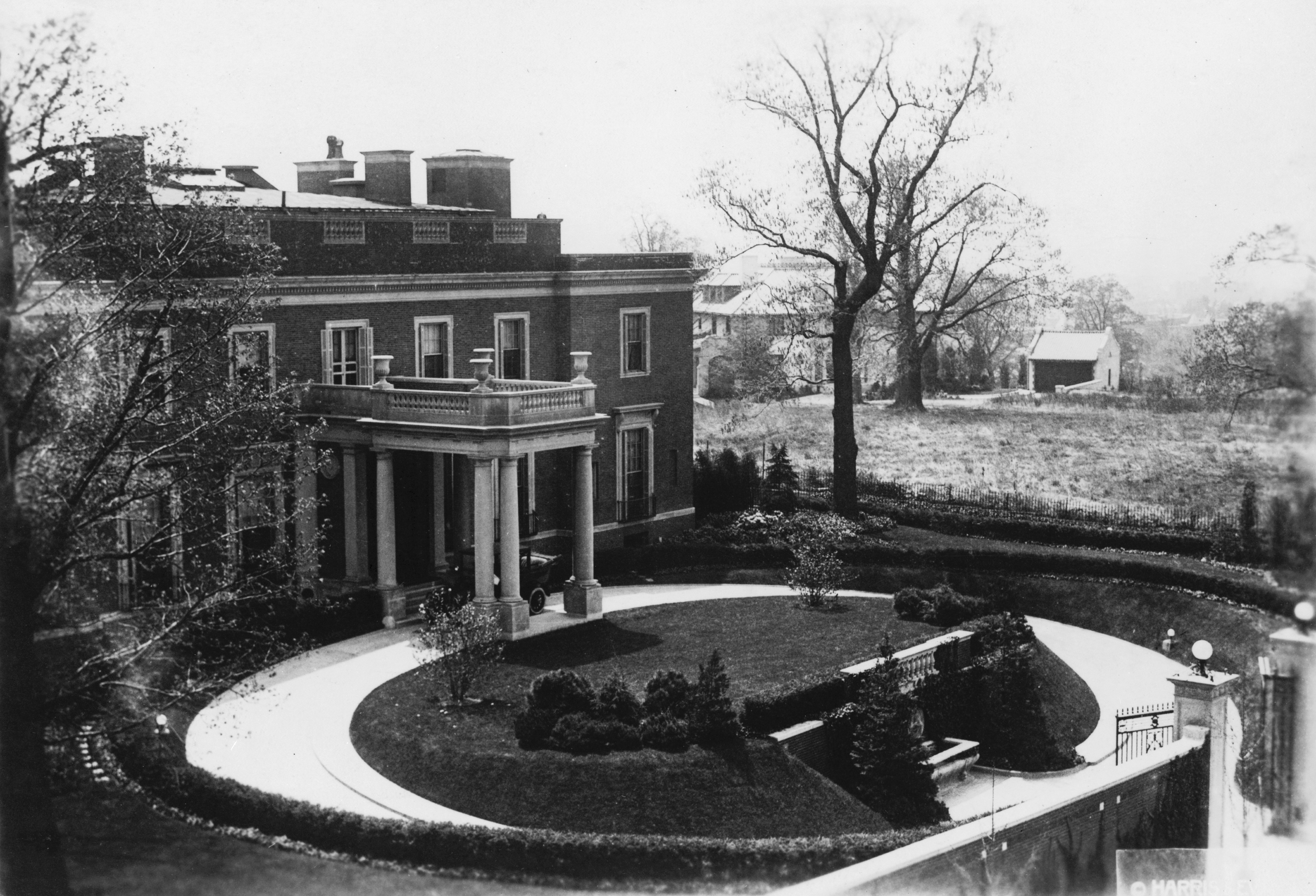
View of the house in the 20th century.

Renowned architect John Russell Pope designed the house and completed it in 1912. Henry White, an American diplomat and a retired ambassador to Italy and France, purchased the property in 1910. He hosted premier diplomatic salon during his stay, inviting well-known guests, including Georges Clemenceau, Robert Cecil, Henry Cabot Lodge and President Warren Harding. In 1917, Henry White lent the house to the French mission of Marshal Joseph Joffre to use as its headquarters. While the French flag flew outside of the residence, Marshal Joffre used the house to host high-level strategic meetings. Many policy meetings were had at the dining room table, including conversations that led to the establishment of the U.S Department of Health, Education and Welfare. When Henry White died, the house was passed on to his son John Campbell White. Financier Eugene Meyer rented the home while he was Chairman of the Federal Reserve (1930–1933), after which he bought the bankrupt Washington Post at auction. In 1934, Meyer bought the house from White for $355,000. During their ownership of the home, the Meyers hosted many prominent guests, including Eleanor Roosevelt, John F. Kennedy, Robert F. Kennedy, Adlai Stevenson, Thomas Mann, Earl Warren and Saul Alinsky.

After the Meyers' deaths, the house became the property of the Eugene and Agnes E. Meyer Foundation, which then leased the house to the Antioch Law School Library. In 1987, Meridian International Center purchased the property.

== Timeline ==
- In 1918, Senator Peter G. Gerry rented the house.
- In the 1920s, President Warren Harding dined at the house.
- In 1922, Georges Clemenceau visited.
- In 1923 and 1925, Lord Robert Cecil visited.
- In 1927, John Campbell White inherited the house.
- In 1934, Eugene Meyer bought the house.
- Charles A. Platt designed the remodeling.
- Eleanor Roosevelt, Adlai Stevenson, President John F. Kennedy, President Lyndon B. Johnson, Robert F. Kennedy, Ted Kennedy, Mayor Walter Washington and Saul Alinsky visited.
- In 1972, the Antioch School of Law rented the house.
- In 1987, Meridian House International (MHI) bought the house.

== Architecture ==
The White-Meyer House holds historical importance both for its illustrious guests and as an early work of renowned architect John Russell Pope - being the first of only two residential designs he created.

=== Architectural Details ===
- Construction: Built between 1910-1912 at a cost of $155,547 (equivalent to ~$4.8 million today)
- Style: Georgian Revival mansion featuring:
  - 40 rooms across its expansive layout
  - Original fireplaces preserved during renovations
  - Prominent hilltop location in Meridian Hill
  - Tall brick enclosure with northern entrance on Crescent Place

=== Landscape Features ===
The property retains much of its original 2-acre garden, including:

- Historic plantings of yews, magnolias, weeping hemlocks, and witch hazels (established by the Meyer family)
- Distinctive brick-and-pebble pathway leading to:
  - An ornamental iron gate featuring a meridian circle
  - Direct connection to neighboring Meridian House

=== Preservation & Recognition ===
- 1964: Added to DC Inventory of Historic Places[1]
- 1988:
  - Listed on National Register of Historic Places (January 20)
  - Underwent award-winning renovation:
    - Received American Institute Award for Excellence
    - Carefully preserved architectural integrity and original gardens
    - Restored walls/ceilings while maintaining historic character

== See also ==
- Henry White
- Eugene Meyer
- John Russell Pope
- Meridian International Center
- Meridian House
