= John Meyer House =

Historic house in Missouri, United States

- U.S. National Register of Historic Places
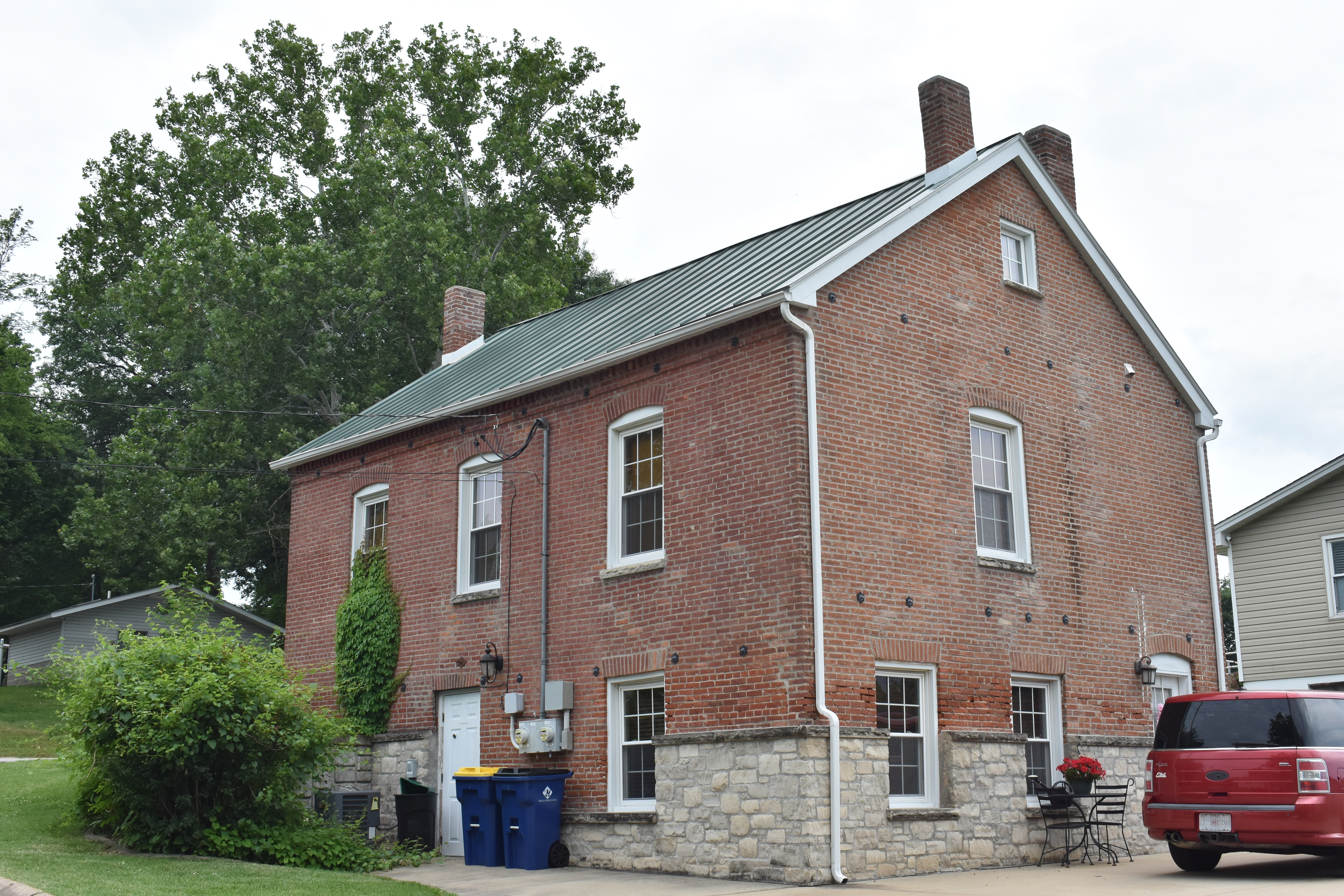
- John Meyer House, May 2026

- Location within Missouri Location within the United States
- Location: 800 E. 6th St., Washington, Missouri
- Coordinates: 38°33′6″N 91°0′13″W
- Area: less than one acre
- Built: c. 1873
- Architectural style: Missouri-German
- MPS: Washington, Missouri MPS
- NRHP reference No.: 00001108
- Added to NRHP: September 14, 2000

John Meyer House, also known as the Mary Eckelkamp House, is a historic home located at Washington, Franklin County, Missouri. It was built about 1873, and is a 1 1/2-story, center entry brick dwelling on a brick foundation. It has a front gable roof and segmental arched door and window openings. Also on the property is a contributing one-story brick smokehouse.

It was listed on the National Register of Historic Places in 2000.
