= Sutter-Meyer House =

Historic house in Missouri, United States

- U.S. National Register of Historic Places
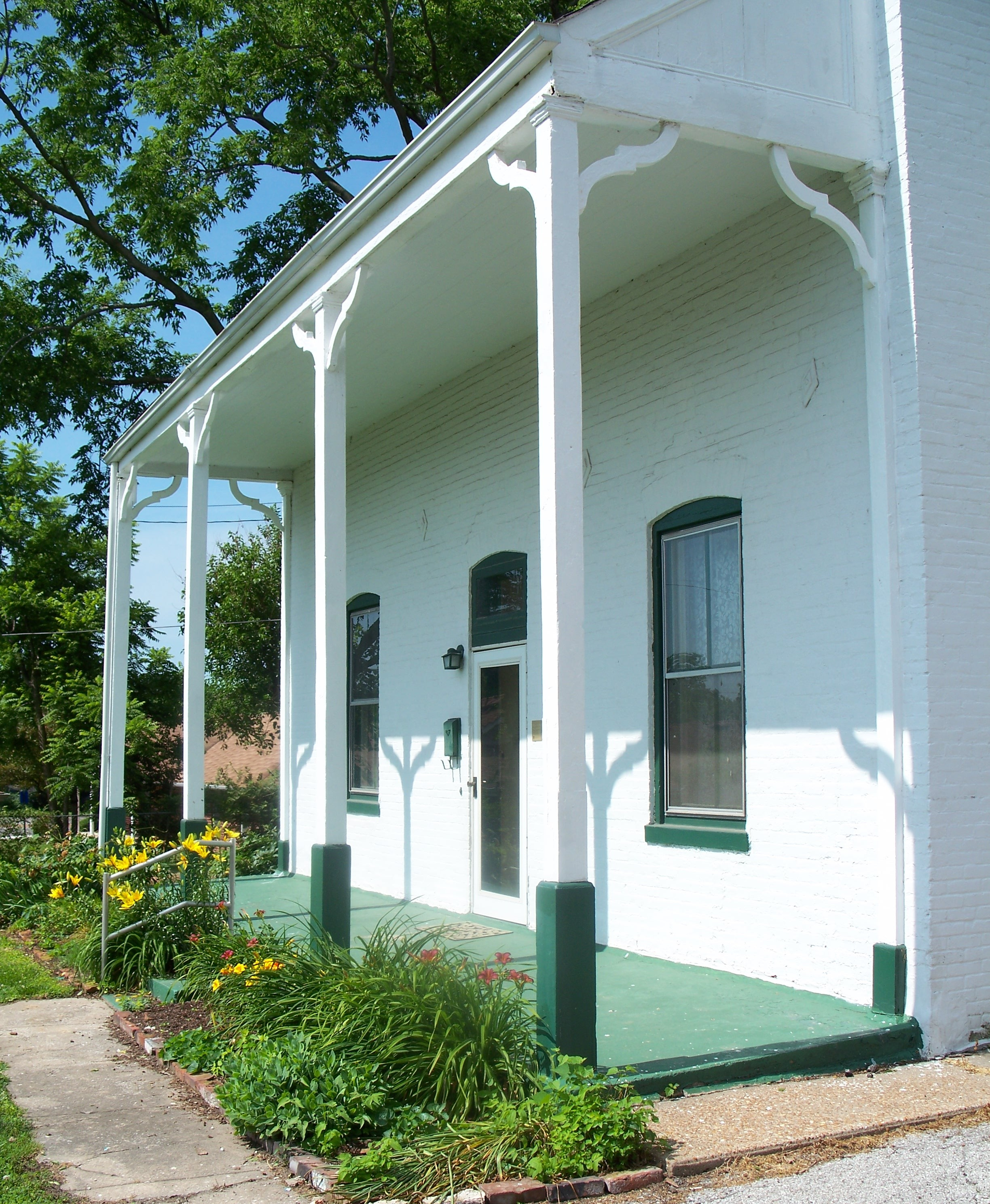
- Sutter-Meyer House

- Location within St. Louis Location within Missouri Location within the United States
- Nearest city: University City
- Coordinates: 38°39′51″N 90°18′41″W
- Area: 0.3 acres (0.12 ha)
- Built: 1873
- Architect: William Sutter
- NRHP reference No.: 82004725
- Added to NRHP: April 12, 1982

The Sutter-Meyer House is the oldest known residence in University City, Missouri, United States. It was built in 1873 and was added to the National Register of Historic Places in 1982. In 1986, it was designated a Landmark of University City by the Historic Preservation Commission.

== History ==
The house was built by William and Julia Sutter, probably in 1873, on an 8.33-acre (33,700 m^{2}) tract of land inherited from William's father, John Sutter. The original John Sutter farm was bounded by the present city streets of Sutter, Etzel, Pennsylvania and Olive Street Road. John Sutter (1815–1867) came from Germany with his family in 1831. In 1850, he and his wife Ursula built “The Homestead” (now demolished) on Sutter Avenue near Etzel. Sutter, a dairyman whose business supplied major St. Louis hotels, was the father of 16 children, of whom William Sutter, born in 1846, was one.

The Sutter property was located on Olive Street Road, built in 1851 as a plank road to connect St. Louis with outlying farms and communities to the west northwest. A small community on Olive near the Sutter farm became known as Sutter, Missouri, and had the post office for the region. William Sutter sold his house and property in 1875 to Roman Meyer (1847–1913), another German immigrant. Meyer, like many of his neighbors along Olive, was a truck farmer supplying the growing population of St. Louis.

The Sutter lands were subdivided over the years for the suburban residences. In 1906, the area was incorporated into the new municipality of University City. In the following years, as the area developed, the Meyer family continued gardening, providing fresh vegetables and fruit for the surrounding new neighborhoods.

In 1951, much of the remaining undeveloped land of the Meyer farm was replotted as the Keating Subdivision. Chamberlain was extended west to form a cul-de-sac, and the address of the old house changed from 6805 Olive Street Road to 6826 Chamberlain Court. New houses were built on Chamberlain Court in the 1950s. The Sutter-Meyer house remained in the Meyer family until the death of Edward Meyer, Roman Meyer's son, in 1969.

== Description ==
The house as a 1½ story main block, three bays wide and one deep, with a 1-story wing to the rear and a later 2-car garage attached to the northwest corner. All portions of the house are of brick, painted white. The windows are tall and narrow, 2 over 2 double-hung, with segmental arched heads. Across the east front of the main block is a verandah, whose roof is supported by shaped slat-like brackets and square posts on square pedestals. The floor of the verandah is now concrete. Twin chimneys pierce the rear slope of the main roof, they have elaborately corbelled tops. Original woodwork remains throughout the interior, including shaped lintels over doors and windows, and a fireplace in the south room. The staircase ascends away from the front door and turns into the north room; it once had a second flight into the kitchen. Basement stairs descend from the back porch, which was enclosed in 1951. The kitchen has been modernized.

== Facts ==
- The lot is a remnant of the original 8.33 acres (33,700 m^{2}).
- The land to the south of the Sutter-Meyer house is no longer open.
- As of 2003, the Sutter-Meyer House is no longer privately owned.
- The building does not have frontage on to Olive Boulevard.
