= Jonathan C. and Eliza K. Royle House =

Historic house in Salt Lake City, Utah, U.S.

- U.S. National Register of Historic Places
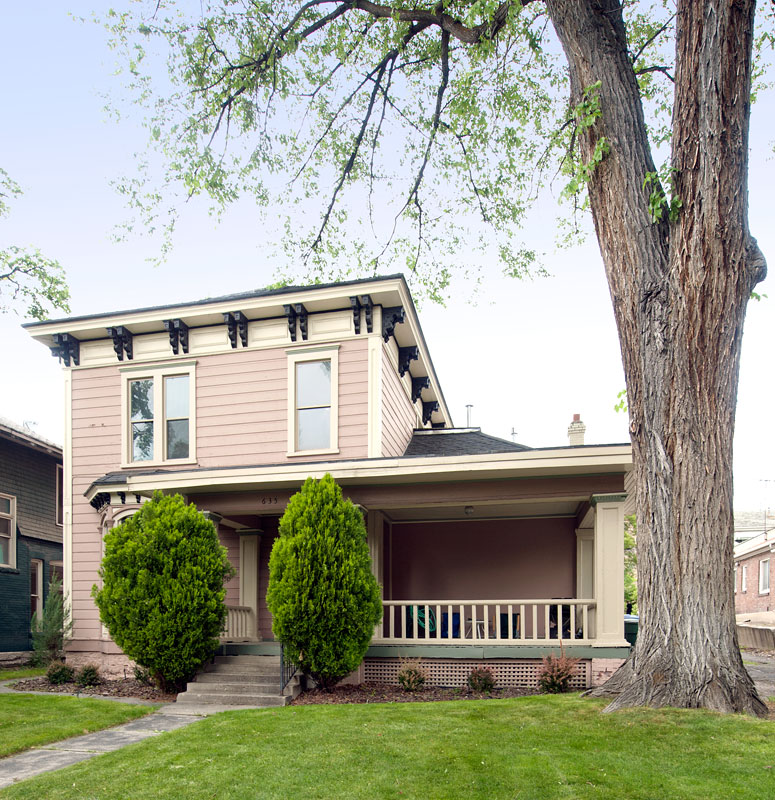

- Location within Utah Location within the United States
- Location: 635 E. 100 South, Salt Lake City, Utah
- Coordinates: 40°46′3″N 111°52′21″W
- Area: less than one acre
- Built: 1875
- Architectural style: Italianate
- NRHP reference No.: 83003176
- Added to NRHP: January 3, 1983

The Jonathan C. and Eliza K. Royle House, at 635 East 100 South in Salt Lake City, Utah, is an Italianate style house that was built in 1875. It was listed on the National Register of Historic Places in 1983.

It is significant both as "one of the finest examples of the Italianate style in Salt Lake City" and as the home of prominent citizens Jonathan C. and Eliza K. Royle. Jonathan Royle was a mining attorney, while his wife Eliza was president of the city's Ladies' Literary Club; both were otherwise active socially. According to the National Register nomination, their residence "was one of the earliest 'high style' houses constructed along First South", which became "a prestigious residential area" in the late nineteenth century. It is one of only two frame-style Italianate houses known in the city.
