= Myer House (Dublin, Ohio) =

Historic house in Ohio, United States

- U.S. National Register of Historic Places
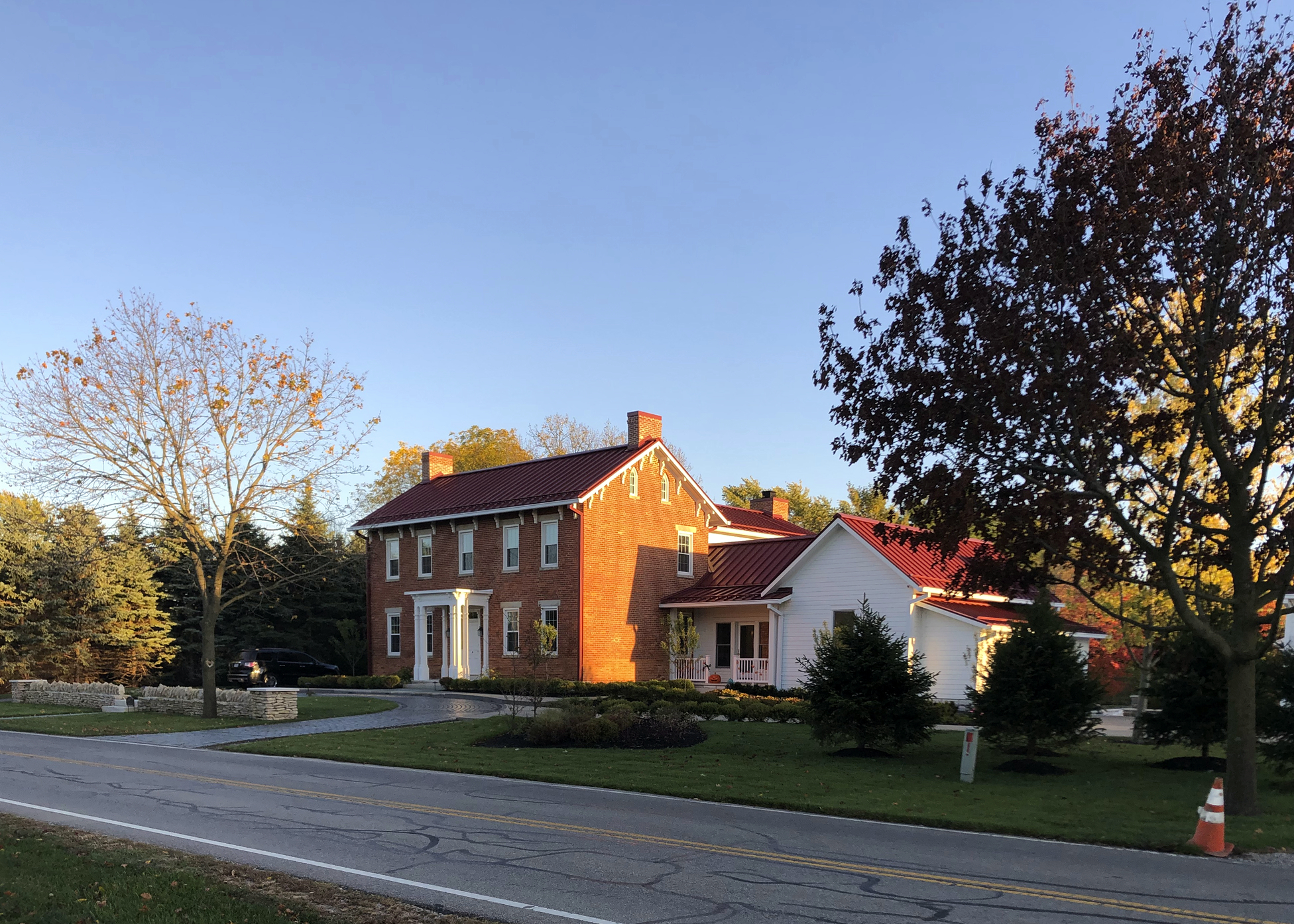
- Front and side of the house

- Location within Ohio Location within the United States
- Location: 5827 Rings Road, Dublin, Ohio
- Coordinates: 40°4′50.5″N 83°9′3″W
- Area: Less than 1 acre (0.40 ha)
- Built: 1850
- MPS: Washington Township MRA
- NRHP reference No.: 79002689
- Added to NRHP: April 11, 1979

The Myer House is a historic farmhouse in Washington Township, Franklin County, Ohio, United States. One of the area's older agricultural buildings, the house has seen few changes since its mid-nineteenth-century construction, and it has been designated a historic site.

The Myer House is a brick building with a stone foundation, a metal roof, and various elements of stone. Constructed in 1850, the house is among Washington Township's earlier farm-related buildings. The structure is a simple rectangle divided into five bays, while the two-bay sides rise to gables. Some of the windows are arched rather than rectangular, with their glass divided into six separate panes, while the windows are surrounded by stone windowsills and lintels. The overhanging roof forms eaves with brackets for support.

Few modifications have been made to the house since it was erected. Prominent among the few exceptions was the addition of extra rooms: a rear wing, one and a half stories tall, was attached to the original two-story house long after the original building was completed. In 1979, the house's well-preserved historic architecture led to its addition to the National Register of Historic Places; it was part of a large multiple property submission by which many buildings in Washington Township, Dublin, and nearby parts of Columbus were listed on the Register together.
