= Myers House (Martinsburg, West Virginia) =

Historic house in West Virginia, United States

- U.S. National Register of Historic Places
- Location within West Virginia Location within the United States
- Location: Union Corner at end of Rt. 37/1, Martinsburg, West Virginia
- Coordinates: 39°30′17″N 77°55′25″W
- Area: 1 acre (0.40 ha)
- Built: c. 1817
- Architect: Meyers Family
- Architectural style: Federal
- MPS: Berkeley County MRA
- NRHP reference No.: 80004423
- Added to NRHP: December 10, 1980

Myers House is a historic home located at Martinsburg, Berkeley County, West Virginia. It was built about 1817 and is a two-story, Federal-style, brick dwelling. It is five bays wide with a gable roof. The entrance features a Chippendale style transom.

It was listed on the National Register of Historic Places in 1980.
