= Olcovich–Meyers House =

Historic house in Nevada, United States

- U.S. National Register of Historic Places
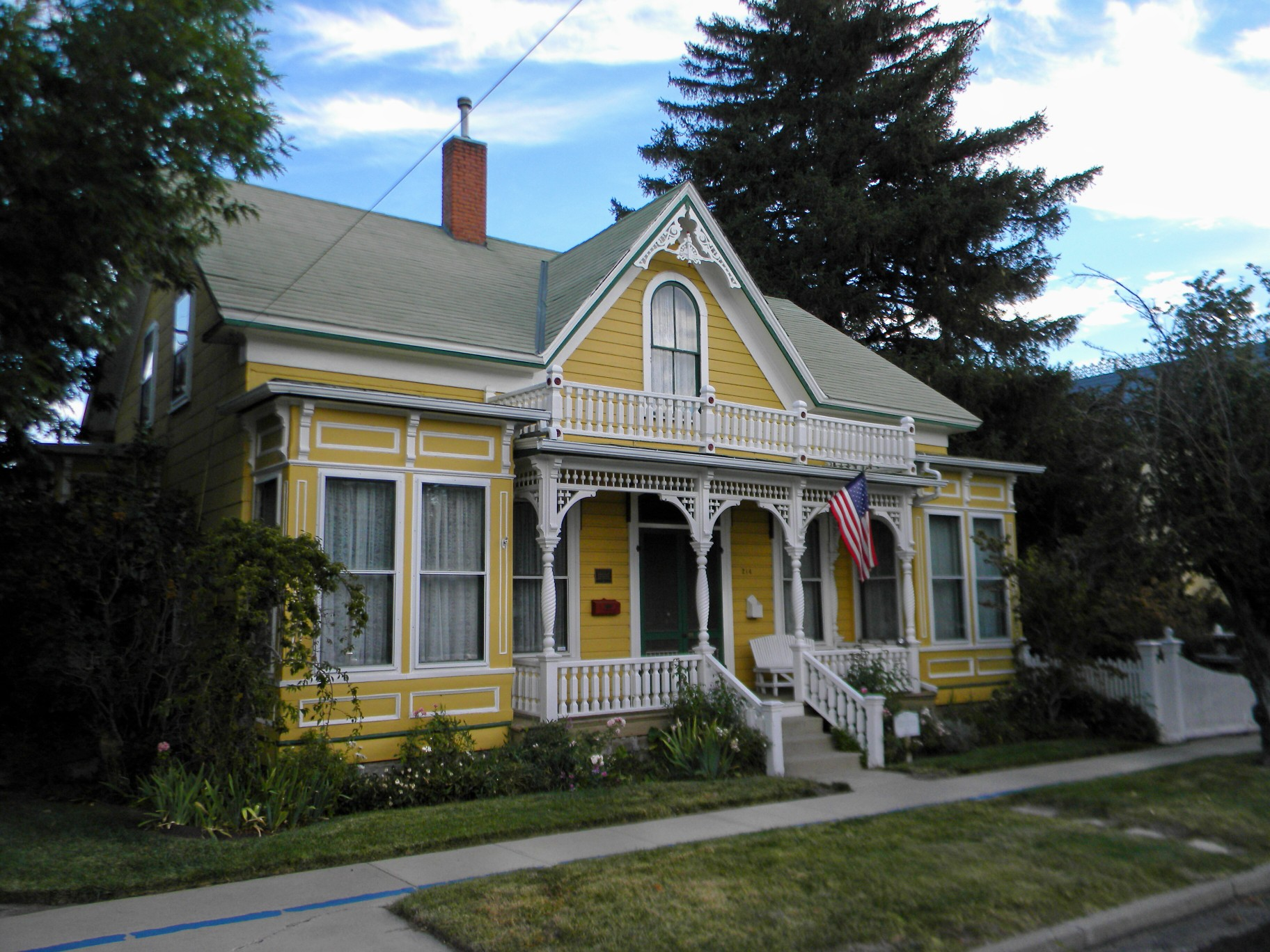

- Location within Nevada Location within the United States
- Location: 214 W. King St., Carson City, Nevada
- Coordinates: 39°9′51″N 119°46′3″W
- Area: less than one acre
- Built: 1874-75
- Built by: Olcovich, Joseph
- Architectural style: Late Victorian
- NRHP reference No.: 93000682
- Added to NRHP: July 29, 1993

The Olcovich–Meyers House, at 214 W. King St. in Carson City, Nevada, is a historic, well-preserved house that was built during 1874–75 with Late Victorian architecture. It was listed on the National Register of Historic Places in 1993. The listing included two contributing buildings.

It is reportedly one of few surviving houses in Carson City that have "Gothic-influenced" architecture. The house also shows Italianate and Eastlake stylistic elements. It was built by Joseph Olcovich for his brother Bernard. Victorian details were probably added in the late 1880s, by George Meyers, who then owned it.
