= Elias Meyers House =

Historic house in Michigan, United States

- U.S. National Register of Historic Places
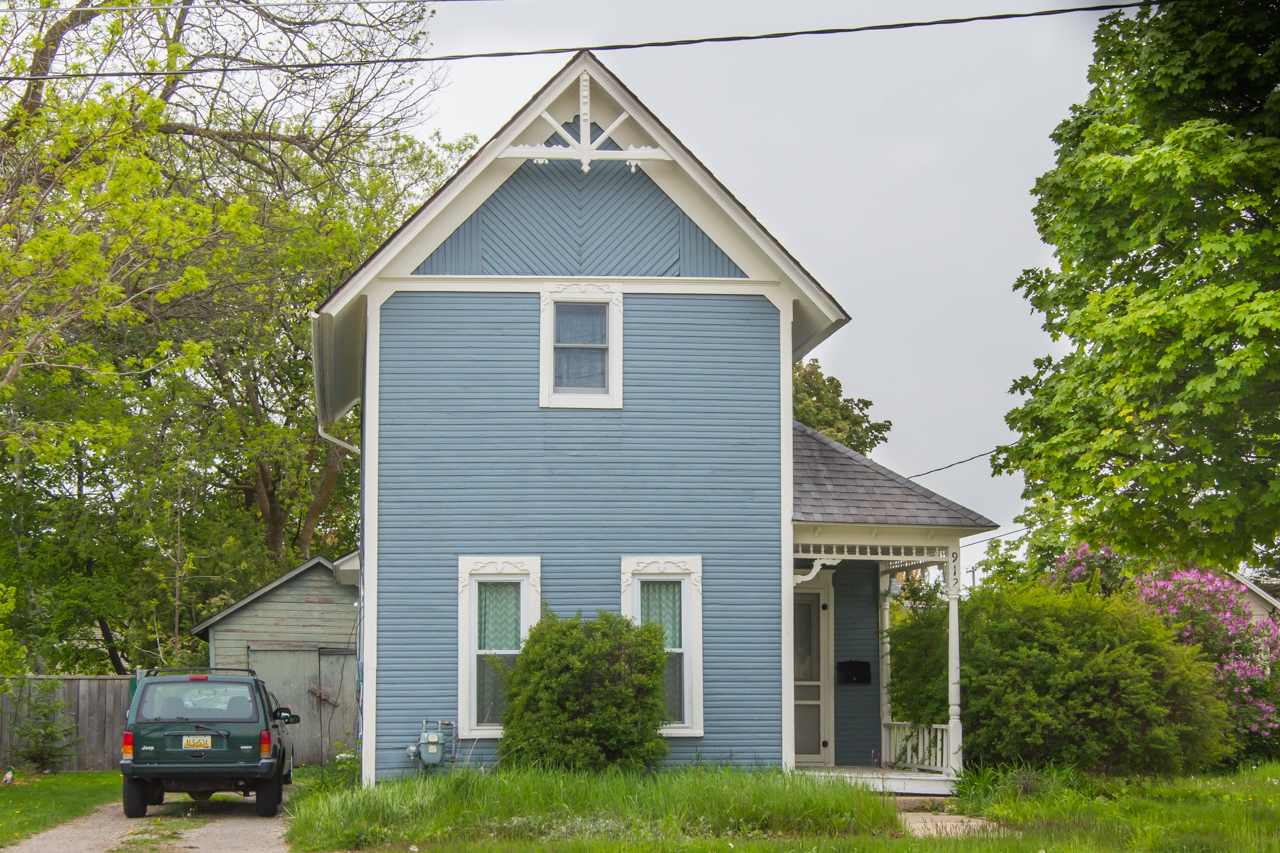

- Location within Michigan Location within the United States
- Interactive map
- Location: 912 Baxter St., Petoskey, Michigan
- Coordinates: 45°22′8″N 84°57′39″W
- Area: 0.3 acres (0.12 ha)
- Architectural style: Queen Anne
- MPS: Petoskey MRA
- NRHP reference No.: 86002030
- Added to NRHP: September 10, 1986

The Elias Meyers House is a private house located at 912 Baxter Street in Petoskey, Michigan. It was placed on the National Register of Historic Places in 1986.

The Elias Meyers House is a two-story front-gable Queen Anne structure. A single-story, hip roof entrance porch is attached to one side of the building, and a single-story wing extends from the porch to the rear of the house. Decorative turned elements on the porch and on the front gable are inspired by Eastlake designs. The gable also has diagonal sheathing boards. Windows in the house are one-over-one double-hung units with decorative cornices.

The Elias Meyers House was constructed some time before 1899. It was associated with Elias Meyers, an employee and eventual foreman at the Forman & Curtis Flooring factory.
