= Maxwell F. Mayer House =

Historic house in Arkansas, United States

- U.S. National Register of Historic Places
- U.S. Historic district – Contributing property
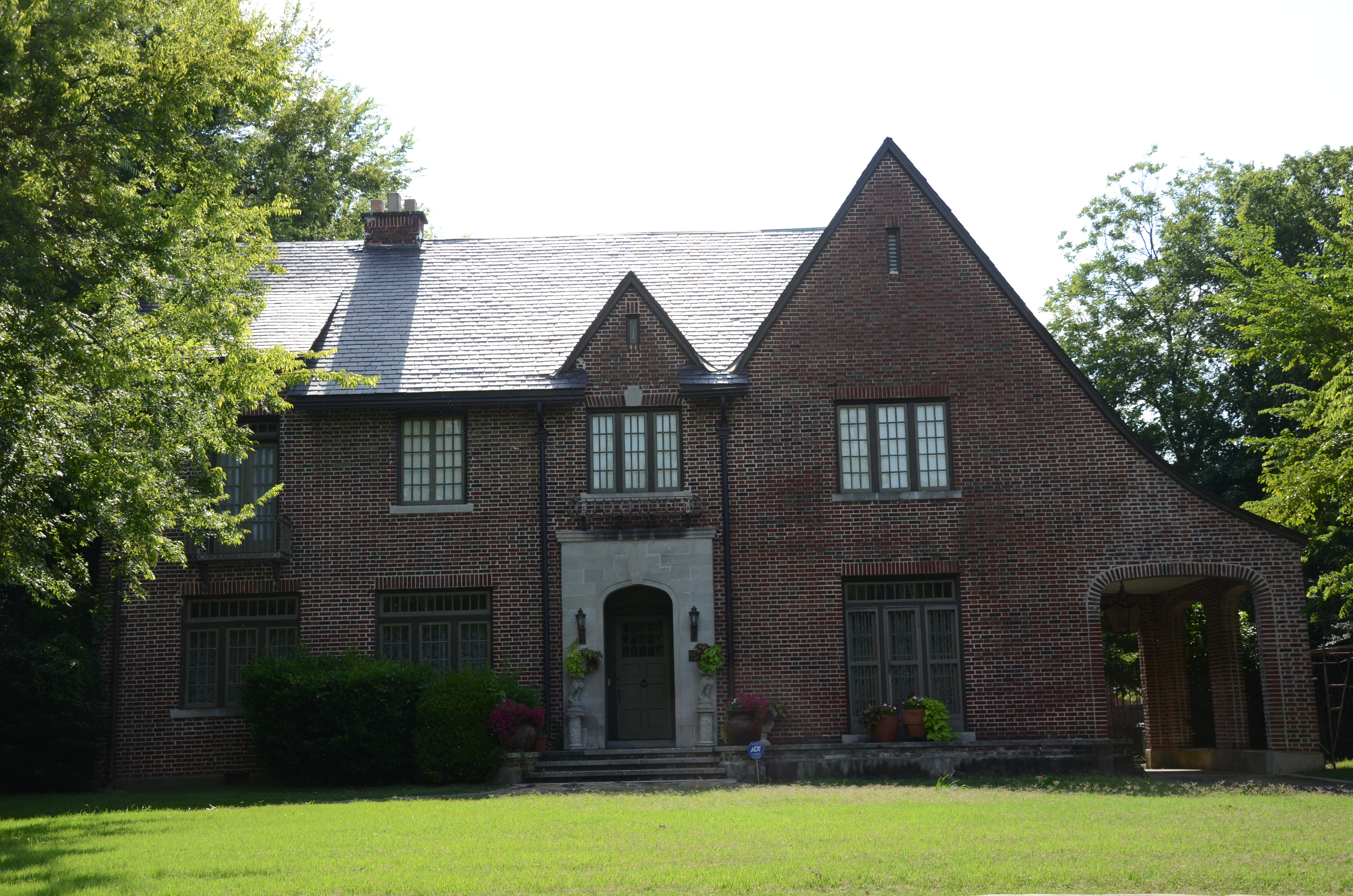

- Location within Arkansas Location within the United States
- Location: 2016 Battery St., Little Rock, Arkansas
- Coordinates: 34°43′47″N 92°17′39″W
- Area: less than one acre
- Architect: Maximilian F. Mayer
- Architectural style: Tudor Revival
- Part of: Central High School Neighborhood Historic District (2012 boundary increase) (ID12000320)
- NRHP reference No.: 94001464

Significant dates
- Added to NRHP: December 9, 1994
- Designated CP: June 7, 2012

The Maxwell F. Mayer House is a historic house at 2016 Battery Street in Little Rock, Arkansas. Built 1922–25, it is a two-story Tudor Revival structure, designed by Little Rock architect Maximilian F. Mayer. The styling is unusual for its neighborhood, which consists mainly of Craftsman and Colonial Revival houses. It has a side-gable roof with a large projecting gable at the right end, whose right roofline descends to the first floor to shelter a porte-cochere.

The house was listed on the National Register of Historic Places in 1994.

== See also ==
- National Register of Historic Places listings in Little Rock, Arkansas
