= Meridian =

Meridian or a meridian line (from Latin meridies via Old French meridiane, meaning “midday”) may refer to:

== Science ==
- Meridian (astronomy), imaginary circle in a plane perpendicular to the planes of the celestial equator and horizon
  - Central meridian (astronomy)
- Meridian (geography), a longitude line, i.e. a line of constant longitude, or in other words an imaginary arc on the Earth's surface from the North Pole to the South Pole
  - Meridian arc, the distance between two points with the same longitude
  - Prime meridian, origin of longitudes
  - Principal meridian, arbitrary meridians used as references in land surveying
- Meridian line, used with a gnomon to measure solar elevation and time of year
- Autonomous sensory meridian response, a static-like or tingling sensation on the skin
- Meridian (vision), polar coordinate system for the visual field

== Places ==
=== Cities and towns ===
- Meridian, California (disambiguation), U.S., multiple California towns named Meridian
- Meridian, Colorado, U.S.
- Meridian Village, Colorado, U.S.
- Meridian, Florida, U.S.
- Meridian, Georgia, U.S.
- Meridian, Idaho, U.S.
- Meridian, Mississippi, U.S.
- Meridian, Nebraska, U.S.
- Meridian, New York, U.S.
- Meridian, Oklahoma (disambiguation), U.S., multiple Oklahoma towns named Meridian
- Meridian, Pennsylvania, U.S.
- Meridian, Seattle, Washington, U.S.
- Meridian, Texas, U.S.

=== Townships ===
- Meridian Township, Clinton County, Illinois, U.S.
- Meridian Charter Township, Michigan, U.S.

=== Buildings ===
- Meridian (Amtrak station), or Union Station, Meridian, Mississippi, U.S.
- Meridian Mall, Meridian Township, Michigan, U.S.
- Meridian Mall, Dunedin, New Zealand
- Meridian Hall (Washington, D.C.), listed on the National Register of Historic Places in Washington, D.C., U.S.
- Meridian Manor, listed on the National Register of Historic Places in Washington, D.C., U.S.
- Meridian Mansions, listed on the National Register of Historic Places in Washington, D.C., U.S.

=== Other places ===
- Lake Meridian, Kent, Washington, U.S.
- Meridian Creek, a stream in Alaska, U.S.
- Meridian Glacier, Graham Land, Antarctica
- Meridian Peak, Eagles Nest Wilderness, near Vail, Colorado, U.S.
- Meridian Plantation, a quail-hunting plantation in Leon County, Florida, U.S., established in 1915

== Arts and entertainment ==
- Meridian, a fictional country in the animated web series MechWest

=== Print ===
- Meridian (novel), 1976 novel by Alice Walker
- Meridian (comics), 2000–2004 comic book series published by CrossGen
- Meridian (W.I.T.C.H.), a fictional realm in the Italian comic book series W.I.T.C.H.
- Meridians: Feminism, Race, Transnationalism (est. 2000), an interdisciplinary peer-reviewed feminist journal

=== Film and television ===
- Meridian: Kiss of the Beast, 1990 horror and romance film directed by Charles Band
- "Meridian" (Star Trek: Deep Space Nine), 1994 episode of the series
- "Meridian" (Stargate SG-1), 2002 episode of the series
- Meridian (film), 2016 film noir thriller directed by Curtis Clark
- ITV Meridian (formerly Meridian Broadcasting), ITV station for the south and south-east of England

=== Music ===
- Meridian Records, record label
- Meridian Dawn, modern death metal band
- Meridian Green, California-based folk musician
- Meridian, 1997 album by Ian Pooley
- Meridian (Miriam Yeung album), 2007 album by Miriam Young
- Meridian (album), 2012 album by Pinegrove
- "Meridian", 2017 song by Odesza from A Moment Apart

=== Other art ===
- Meridian (Hepworth), 1960 bronze sculpture by British artist Barbara Hepworth

== Business ==
- Meridian Audio, British manufacturer of audio equipment
- Meridian Credit Union, credit union based in Ontario, Canada
- Meridian Energy, New Zealand electricity generation and electricity retailing company
- Nortel Meridian, popular PBX telephone system
- Meridian, a health insurance company owned by Centene Corporation

== Education ==
- Meridian High School (disambiguation)
- Meridian Technology Center, Stillwater, Oklahoma, United States

== Transportation ==
- Meridian (train), British Rail Class 222 trains
- Meridian (commuter rail), former commuter rail service in Germany operated by the Bayerische Oberlandbahn
- MS Meridian, cruise ship constructed in 1961
- Meridian (shipwreck), sunken schooner in Lake Michigan
- Piper Meridian, turboprop model of the Piper PA-46 aircraft
- Meridian LRT station, an LRT station on the Punggol LRT line East Loop in Singapore
- Meridian Airways, a defunct Ghanaian airline

== Other ==
- Meridian (Chinese medicine), traditional Chinese medical theory, often employed in acupuncture
- Meridian (horse), American Thoroughbred racehorse, winner of 1911 Kentucky Derby
- Meridian (Nosgoth), the capital of Nosgoth in Blood Omen 2: Legacy of Kain
- Meridian (satellite), a series of Russian military communications satellites
- Meridian F.C., English non-league football club
- Meridian Hospital, a private hospital in Port Harcourt, Rivers State, Nigeria
- Meridian Lossless Packing, a lossless audio compression technique used in DVD-Audio, HD DVD, and many Blu-ray discs
- Project Meridian, a US military autonomous weapons study

== See also ==
- Meridian 59, online game
- Meridian Hill Park, a park in Washington D.C., U.S.
- One Meridian Plaza, an office building that burned down in 1991 in Philadelphia, Pennsylvania, U.S.
