= Henderson Castle (Washington, D.C.) =

Former mansion in Washington, D.C.

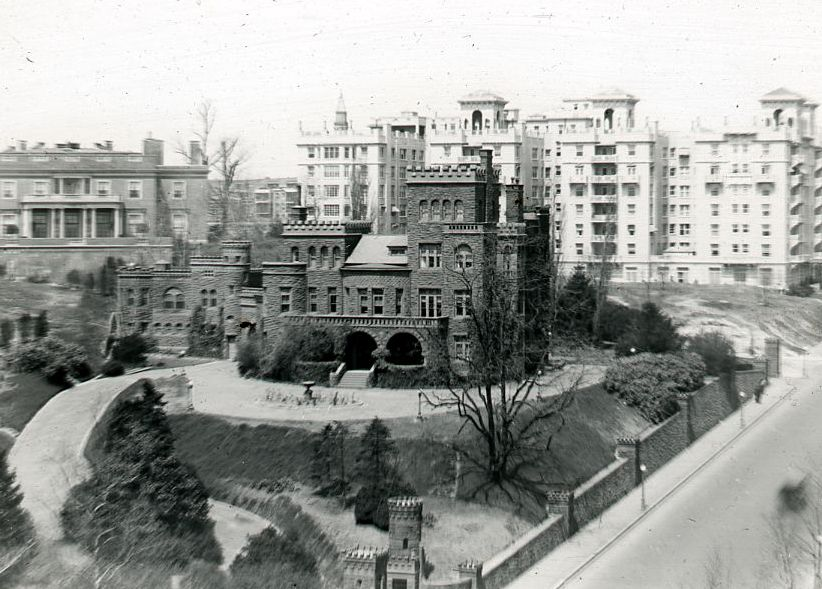
- Henderson Castle with Meridian Mansions (right) and the White-Meyer House (left) in the background
- Interactive map of the Henderson Castle area
- Alternative names: Henderson's Castle, Boundary Castle, Prospect Castle

General information
- Location: 2200 16th Street NW, Washington, D.C.
- Coordinates: 38°55′11″N 77°02′14″W
- Completed: 1889
- Renovated: 1892, 1897, 1902
- Demolished: 1949
- Cost: $100,000
- Renovation cost: $46,000
- Owner: John and Mary Foote Henderson

Height
- Architectural: Romanesque Revival

Technical details
- Material: Seneca sandstone
- Floor count: 4
- Grounds: 6 acres (2.4 ha)

Design and construction
- Architect: Eugene C. Gardner

Renovating team
- Architects: Thomas Franklin Schneider; George Oakley Totten Jr. & Laussat R. Rogers

Henderson Castle (also known as Henderson's Castle, Boundary Castle, and Prospect Castle) was a large Romanesque Revival house once located at 2200 16th Street NW in Washington, D.C. Built in 1889 for former Senator John B. Henderson and his wife, Mary Foote Henderson, the castle was sited on a prominent location overlooking the city. At the time, the area was mostly undeveloped, a fact Mary saw to change through decades of real estate development. Architect Eugene C. Gardner designed the castle, and later renovations were carried out by architects Thomas Franklin Schneider, George Oakley Totten Jr., and Laussat R. Rogers. Mary hired Totten to design many of the grand mansions and embassies on 15th and 16th Street NW which she sold to wealthy residents and foreign governments.

The Hendersons entertained prominent citizens at their castle. Mary was an advocate for women's rights, vegetarianism, and the temperance movement. Mary made national news when she and other members of the Independent Order of Rechabites took over 1,000 bottles of alcohol from the castle's cellar and smashed them on 16th Street. As part of her plans to develop the Meridian Hill neighborhood, Mary convinced Congress to buy land across the street from the castle, which was developed into Meridian Hill Park.

After Mary's death in 1931, the Hendersons' vast art collection and fine furniture were sold at auction. The castle remained unsold and it was converted into the Castle H Swim and Tennis Club in 1937. It was used as a boarding house and social event space until 1948, when all of the remaining contents were sold at auction. In January 1949, the castle was demolished. The property remained vacant for almost 30 years until Katharine Graham sold it to a real estate developer. A gated townhouse community, Beekman Place, was built on the site in 1976. Part of the castle's original perimeter wall and entrance gate still stands on 16th Street.

== History ==
=== Namesake ===
John B. Henderson (1826–1913) was a lawyer and businessman from Missouri who served in the Missouri House of Representatives in the 1840s and 1850s. After the Civil War began in 1861, he was commissioned a brigadier general in the Missouri State Militia, though he never saw active service. In 1862, he was appointed to the United States Senate. During his time in the Senate, Henderson submitted a joint resolution for the Thirteenth Amendment to the United States Constitution, which abolished slavery. He gained a reputation as an independent voice in the Republican Party, often bucking party leadership evidenced by his vote against the impeachment of President Andrew Johnson. For this action, he did not run for re-election and left office in early 1869. Henderson returned to Missouri where he continued practicing law and became wealthy through real estate and bond speculation.

While still serving in the Senate, Henderson married Mary Foote (1842–1931), daughter of Elisha Foote, a lawyer and judge, and Eunice Newton Foote, a women's rights campaigner and scientist who was the first person to describe what is now known as the greenhouse effect. After John and Mary returned to Missouri, Mary authored books on healthy living and hosting social events, studied art at the Washington University in St. Louis, and helped establish the St. Louis School of Design. As a proponent of women's suffrage, she co-founded the Missouri State Suffrage Association. Mary was known as a strong-willed woman who supported women's rights, vegetarianism, and the temperance movement.

=== House history ===
==== Construction ====
The Hendersons returned to Washington, D.C. in the 1880s after John retired. While searching for suitable land to build their house, the couple lived at the Arno Hotel on 16th Street NW between I and K Streets. North of their hotel, an area beyond the original city boundaries had remained mostly undeveloped. This area, named Meridian Hill, was north of Boundary Street (present-day Florida Avenue). Between January 1887 and April 1888, the couple purchased six lots in Meridian Hill from A. P. Fardon, James Curtis, and William C. Hill at a total cost of almost $50,000. John and other area landowners formed the Meridian Hill Improvement Association which sought funds from Congress to make improvements in the neighborhood.

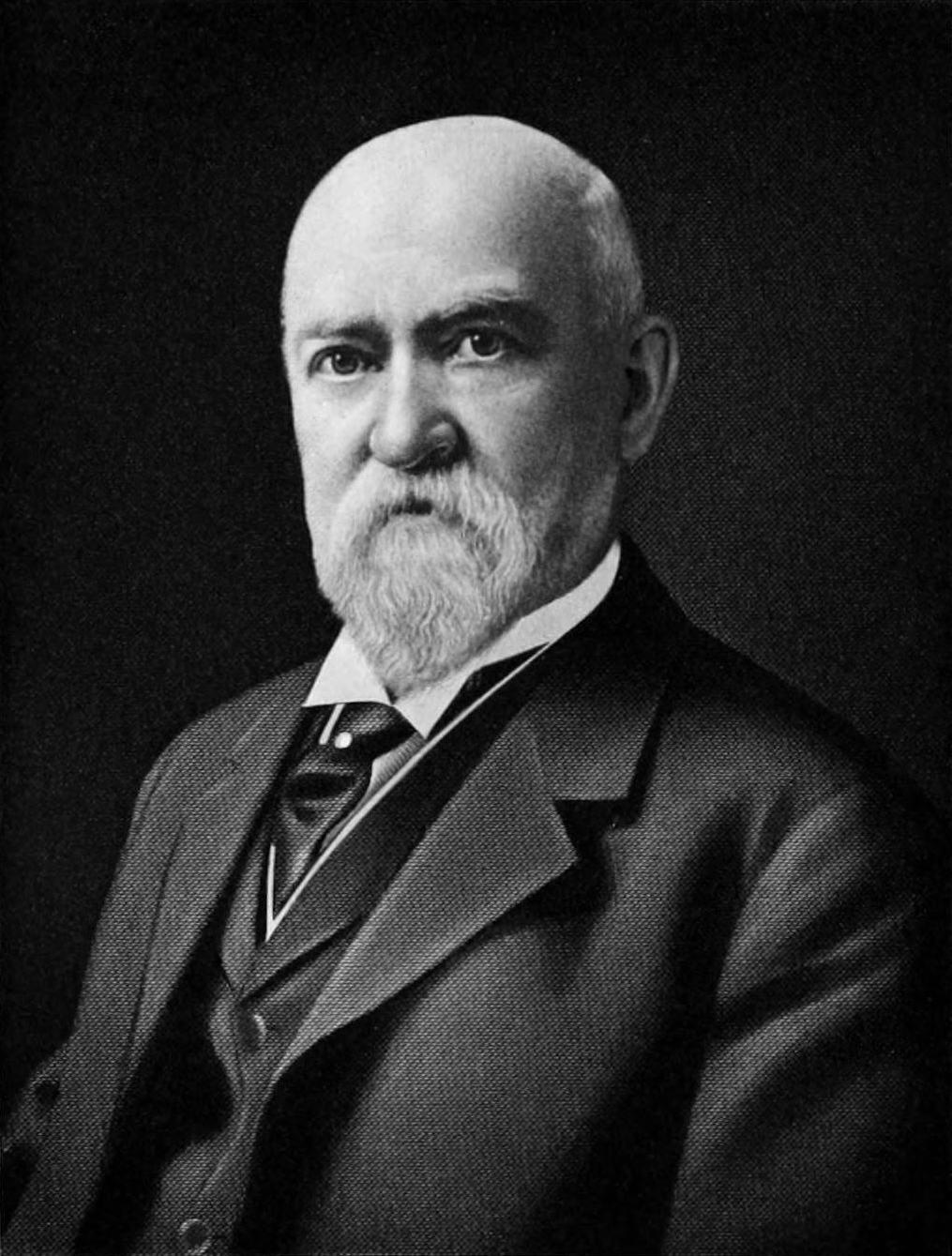
Eugene C. Gardner designed the original portion of the castle.

On April 12, 1888, a building permit was issued for the Henderson's new house, located just south of the Joaquin Miller Cabin. Mary played a large role in overseeing its design and construction. The couple's choice of architect Eugene C. Gardner was possibly due to Gardner's 1882 book The House That Jill Built, After Jack's Had Proved a Failure, which told "how a wife's clearheaded analysis of a house's functions overcame her husband's dysfunctional design preferences." Gardner was from Springfield, Massachusetts, but briefly ran an office located at 1420 New York Avenue NW in Washington, D.C. in the late 1880s. His designs, many of which are now historic landmarks, included churches, schools, houses, hotels, and other commercial buildings. There are fifteen known buildings in Washington, D.C., designed by Gardner, including a now-demolished house for Stilson Hutchins, founder of The Washington Post.

The total cost for construction of their house, located at 2200 16th Street NW, was around $50,000, bringing the total cost of the land and house to approximately $100,000. (equivalent to $3,583,333.33 in 2025) The red Seneca sandstone house, completed in 1889, was designed in the Romanesque Revival and supposedly modeled after a castle Mary had seen in Germany or Normandy. The main portion of the house was three-stories and there were two four-story towers. Due to its medieval appearance and location just north of Boundary Street, the house was known originally known as Boundary Castle. It was later referred to as Henderson Castle, Henderson's Castle, and Prospect Castle. The entrance gates were located on 16th Street, but the castle faced south towards the city. According to historians Sue A. Kohler and Jeffrey R. Carson, "the location and design gave the impression that the castle was somehow strategic to the defense of the city, while the heights gave the occupants a psychological advantage over the ferret-like maneuvering of those who resided below." It would earn a reputation as one of Washington's most famous Gilded Age houses.

==== Early years ====
On February 10, 1890, the Hendersons hosted their first formal dinner at their castle. The invited guests included numerous delegates in town for the First International Conference of American States, justices of the Supreme Court, members of Congress, ambassadors, generals, and other members of high society, including Andrew Carnegie and John George Nicolay. The great ballroom was 100 feet (30.4 m) long, 75 feet (22.9 m) wide, and 30 feet (9.1 m) high, and included a stage and balcony. A description of the house interior was provided by a reporter from The Evening Star:

Inside the hall is decorated in green and mastic color, in the Moorish fashion, and about the door casings, windows and ceilings are engraved mottoes from Mahomet's Koran in the Arabic characters. The drawing rooms open one on each side from the hall; to the left is the buttercup yellow room, with its onyx mantel and hearth, and out of this opens the domed picture gallery, which last night had its faded rose plush divans pushed back against the walls that the polished oak floors might be cleared for the dancing. The walls are hung with plush that makes an agreeable background for a fine collection of paintings from the French and Flemish schools. The drawing room to the right is also in faded rose plush and its open into the oaken dining room, which has its walls above the fluted oak wainscot hung with a green tapestry woven in a pattern of oak leaves. The staircase of oak ascends from the rear side of the square hall. The library is in the front of the house, on the second floor, and is shelved to the ceiling in mahogany; Mrs. Henderson's pretty pink boudoir opens out of it. On the third floor among others is the room of Mr. Jno. N. Henderson, jr., all in blue, and out of it by a spiral staircase is reached the square room in the top of the highest tower.

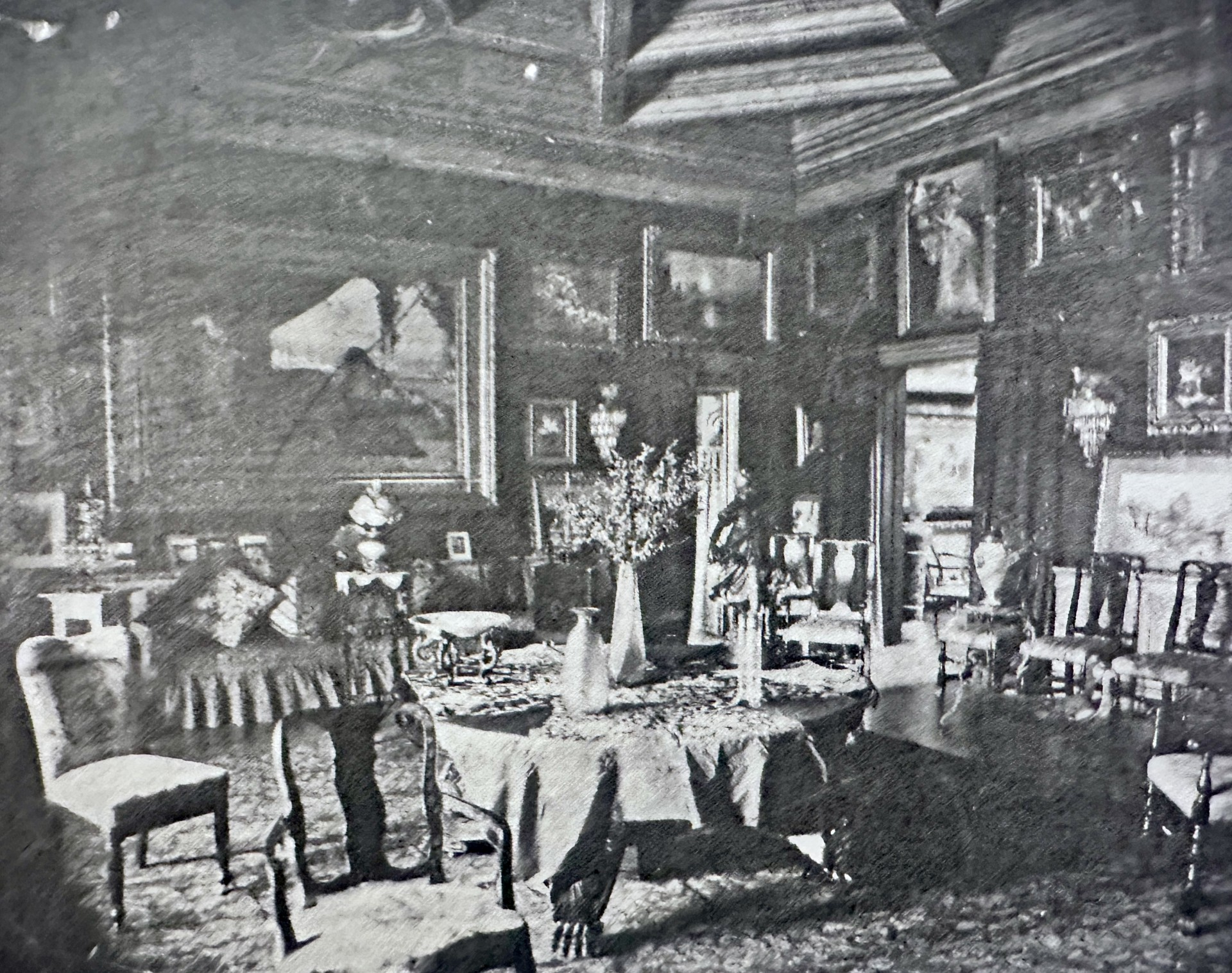
The castle's drawing room in the 1890s

After the success of this event, many were eager for an invitation to dine at Henderson Castle, even though Mary made sure to only serve vegetarian cuisine. Two years later, the Hendersons hired local architect Thomas Franklin Schneider to design a stable for ten horses and a large wing for servants' quarters. The wing was decorated with crenelated battlements, further giving the house a castle-like appearance. The cost of construction was around $20,000. In 1897, a two-story brick and stone addition with basement was built. The architect is unknown, and the cost was around $18,000.

Inspired by the City Beautiful movement, Mary sought to transform 16th Street and Meridian Hill into a prominent gateway into the nation's capital, similar to the Champs-Élysées in Paris. In 1898, there were suggestions the White House was too small, and a larger, grander one should be built. Mary worked with architect Paul J. Pelz to design a new executive mansion to be located in present-day Meridian Hill Park, across the street from the castle. Congress declined her suggestion. Two years later, she worked with architect Franklin W. Smith on another design, which was also rejected by Congress. In 1901, a brick garage was added to the castle "wherein to keep a locomobile", later expanded to accommodate four vehicles. The following year, the couple hired architects George Oakley Totten Jr. and Laussat R. Rogers to remodel the castle. This $8,000 project entailed replacing iron cornices and battlements with stone and replacing the three-story wooden bay portico with stone masonry. After purchasing two adjoining lots in 1903 from Mary Ord Preston and James Orme, the total area of their estate on 16th Street was 6 acres (2.4 ha).

The Hendersons bought lots in the surrounding area, the beginning of a long history of Mary investing in local real estate. She eventually owned around 300 lots and played a large role in the development of Meridian Hill. Having been impressed with Totten's work, Mary worked with him on designing nearly a dozen palatial embassies and residences along 15th and 16th Streets. The first was the Pink Palace, built in 1906. That same year Mary and other members of the Independent Order of Rechabites, a temperance movement, caused an incident when the women decided to dispose of almost 1,000 bottles of wine, whiskey, and brandy from the castle cellar. As reported in a front page article of The New York Times, after bringing the bottles to 16th Street, the women smashed them, creating a river of alcohol flowing down the road. Two months later, it was reported there was a congressional proposal to convert the castle into the presidential residence at a cost of $600,000, but the cost was deemed excessive by the Board of Commissioners.

After the earlier unsuccessful attempts to have the new presidential house built across the street, in 1910 Congress agreed to pay $490,000 for the 11.42 acres (4.62 ha) of property for use a public park. Two years later, Mary asked Congress to build the proposed Lincoln Memorial on the site. She had hired architects Frederick V. Murphy and Walter B. Olmsted to design her proposal, but as was the case with the new White House, Congress rejected her offer. The following year John died after suffering from a long-term kidney illness. Mary continued her real estate business, selling lots to individuals who promised to build lavish homes, and working with Totten on his designs of the French, Lithuanian, Polish, Cuban, and Spanish embassies. In 1914, Mary had a pavilion and tennis court constructed on her property, followed by an extension of the brick wall running along Florida Avenue. She had a swimming pool built in 1921, one of the first private pools in the city. Meanwhile, construction continued on Meridian Hill Park, and she often had to lobby Congress for its funding.

==== Later years ====
During an event held at the Japanese embassy around 1920, Mary and her son, John B. Henderson, Jr., met Jesse Shima, an immigrant from Okinawa who had recently moved to Washington. Impressed by his demeanor, Mary invited him to work for her at the castle. After initially declining her offer, Mary sent her limousine to pick him and bring Shima to her home. She hired Shima to assist in the castle and paid for him to attend National University School of Law for three years and to take pilot lessons with Mount Vernon Airways. When Henderson Jr., her only surviving child, died in 1923, Mary asked Shima to oversee her estate office. The two became close, with Shima acting as her personal assistant and constant companion. The two ate together and Shima slept in her son's former room. Shima oversaw all staff operations at the castle, including sending the gardener to collect trash on 16th Street all the way to the White House, upon Mary's insistence. According to Shima, Mary showed him a secret compartment in her dressing room where she kept a cache of diamonds and other jewelry.

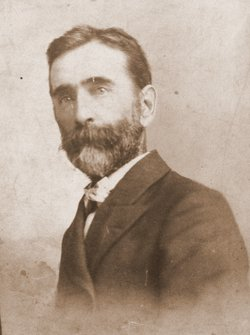
Mary invited landscape painter Lucien Whiting Powell to set up a studio in the castle in 1930.

In 1930, Mary met Lucien Whiting Powell, a renowned landscape painter. She became his patron, purchasing several of Powell's artworks and arranged for him to set up a studio at the castle. According to Powell, "she told me what to paint, and I painted it." Mary died the following year, setting off a legal battle for her estate estimated at over $5 million (equivalent to $105,853,391.68 in 2025). Due to changes her in will that disinherited a granddaughter who attempted to have Mary committed to a mental institution, the bulk of her estate, including the castle, was left to her nephew and niece. Mary left Shima $100,000 in cash, a $100,000 trust fund, and ownership of two mansions designed by Totten: 2401 15th Street NW (which was being leased to the Nicaraguan embassy) and 2437 15th Street NW, where Shima had lived for the prior year. Due to laws at the time preventing foreigners from owning property in Washington, and following continued litigation with other recipients of the estate, Shima ended up with $67,500. He was later interned with others of Japanese descent during World War II, but returned to Washington where he became a successful businessman.

The castle was put up for sale by Mary's relatives. It remained unoccupied and in 1935, Mary's vast art collection and fine furniture were sold at auction. Hundreds of people attended an early inspection of the items to be auctioned, with Shima acting as a guide. Over 400 people attended the opening auction event in February 1935. Artwork was sold at drastically reduced prices, including a painting Mary bought for $25,000 that was sold for $100. Seventy-six paintings by Powell were sold, with his widow buying three for $175. Items including beds, staff uniforms, and other "odds and ends" that were not bought during the final auction event were sold a few weeks later. Later that year, zoning regulations in the surrounding area were changed to allow for the construction of additional apartment buildings. There were plans to demolish the castle, but due to the asking price of $500,000 for the house and land, it remained unsold.

In 1937, the castle was leased to Bert L. E. Williams and John H. Tasker. The men converted the property into the Castle H Swim and Tennis Club. The club's bar was located in the ballroom and the upper floors were renovated into a "high-class rooming house". The club hosted after-hours events which annoyed neighbors, including Eugene and Agnes E. Meyer, whose White-Meyer House was located behind the castle. Having grown tired of the noise, the Meyers purchased the castle property in 1941 for $150,000.

The castle was leased to L. A. Detterer and Ethel K. Allison. In 1942, residents of the boarding house at the castle protested 40% rooming and food increases which Detterer and Allison attributed to rising expenses. Social events continued at the castle into the 1940s, including cabaret performances. In 1947, the Internal Revenue Bureau filed suit against the club's owners to collect $11,000 in cabaret taxes. At that time, it was known as the Henderson Castle Club. The following year the contents of the castle were put up for auction. An auction advertisement stated: "Entire contents of home lately used as a nite club and guest home. 32 rooms of guest home furniture, restaurant equipment, club fixtures, cash register, fine large deep freeze box, baby grand piano, rugs, and all other furnishings."

==== Demolition and replacement ====
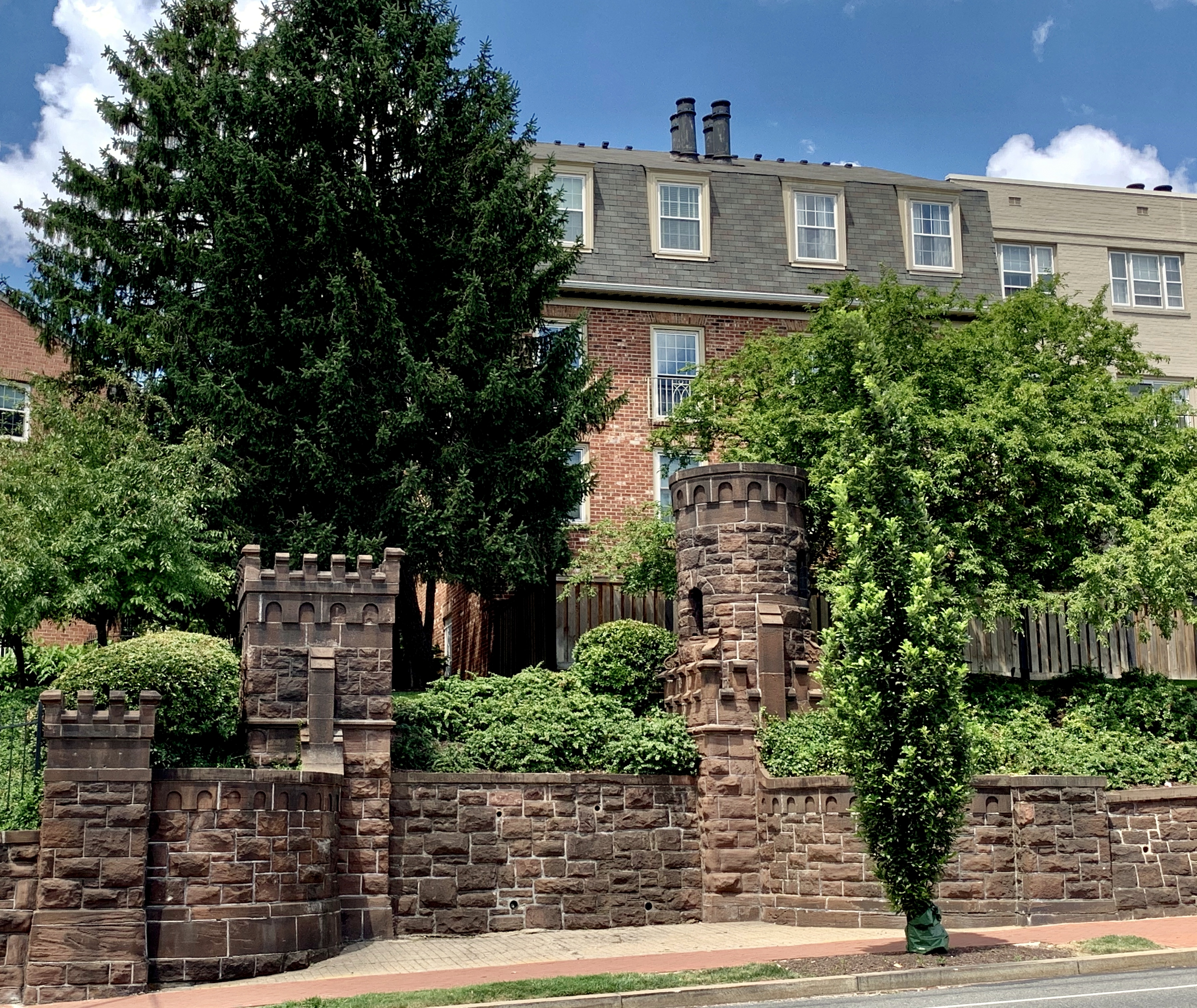
The castle's perimeter wall and entrance gate on 16th Street NW

By the 1940s, Victorian houses like Henderson Castle had fallen out of fashion. In January 1949, a demolition permit was issued for the castle. A dismissive editorial in The Washington Post stated "It is well that this brownstone ghost is at last laid low by the hammers of the wreckers", to which a reader replied "I would suggest to you in furtherance of your love of modernistic architecture, that you make arrangements to have the lovely Washington Post Building...torn down and replaced by one of those slab-sided architectural monstrosities of soulless modernity." Members of the public were invited to tour the house for the last time. An article in The Washington Post described the scene: "Throughout the day, thousands of sightseers walked the bare hall, trampled the tangles of weeds that were once trim gardens, and marveled at the stark edifice. Bamboo from a jungle-like wood beside the castle was uprooted and carted away by visitors. Tiles were torn from the fireplaces and tapestry was snipped from the walls." A marble bust of John was found in the cellar, damaged and decorated with makeup. Regarding Mary's cache of diamonds and other jewelry, Shima said no one else knew about it and he often wondered if they were discovered by demolition workers or sold at one of the auctions.

In 1967, the House Committee on the District of Columbia suggested purchasing the site to build a new headquarters for the Organization of American States. In 1971, the American Baptist Service Corporation planned to purchase the property to build a 1,000-unit affordable housing complex and a nursing home. The plan never came to fruition and five years later, Katharine Graham, daughter of the Meyers and publisher of The Washington Post, sold the property to real estate developer Lawrence Brandt for $1.2 million. A 216-unit gated townhouse community, Beekman Place, was built on the site. Part of the castle's original perimeter wall and entrance gate can still be seen on 16th Street, starting at the corner of Florida Avenue, proceeding to Belmont Street. These surviving elements of the Henderson property are contributing properties to the Meridian Hill Historic District, which was listed on the National Register of Historic Places in 2014.

== Notes ==
1. The historic landmark nomination form can be found at the bottom of the linked page in PDF format.

== See also ==
- Leiter House
- Stewart's Castle
