= IADB =

IADB may refer to:

- Inter-American Development Bank, an international organization to support Latin American and Caribbean economic and social development and regional integration
- Inter-American Defense Board, an international committee of nationally appointed defense officials in North, Central, and South America
- Integrated Archaeological Database, an open-source web-based application for archaeological excavation projects
