= Meridian Hill =

Coordinates: 38.921428°N 77.035816°W

- Neighborhood of Washington, D.C.
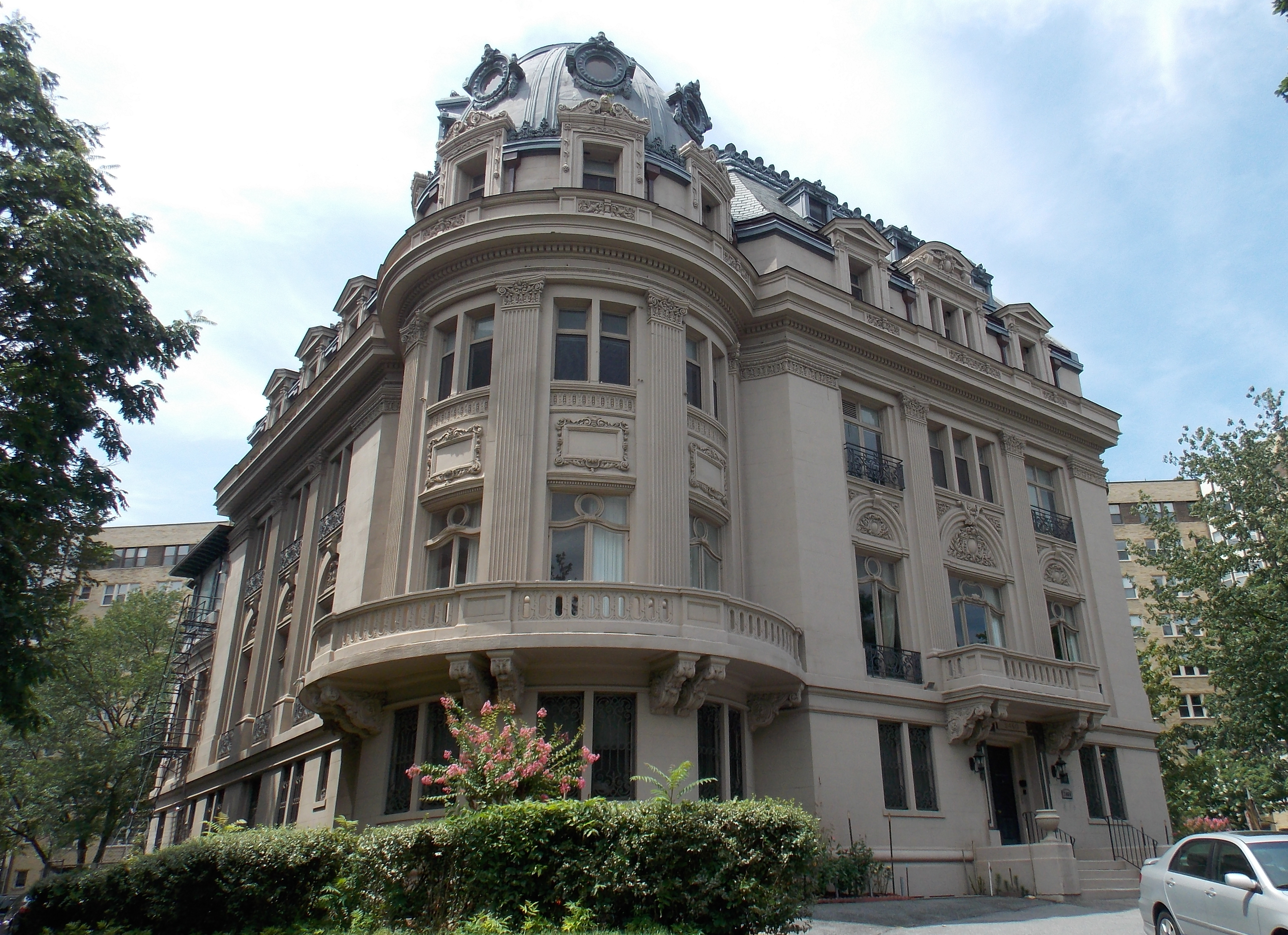
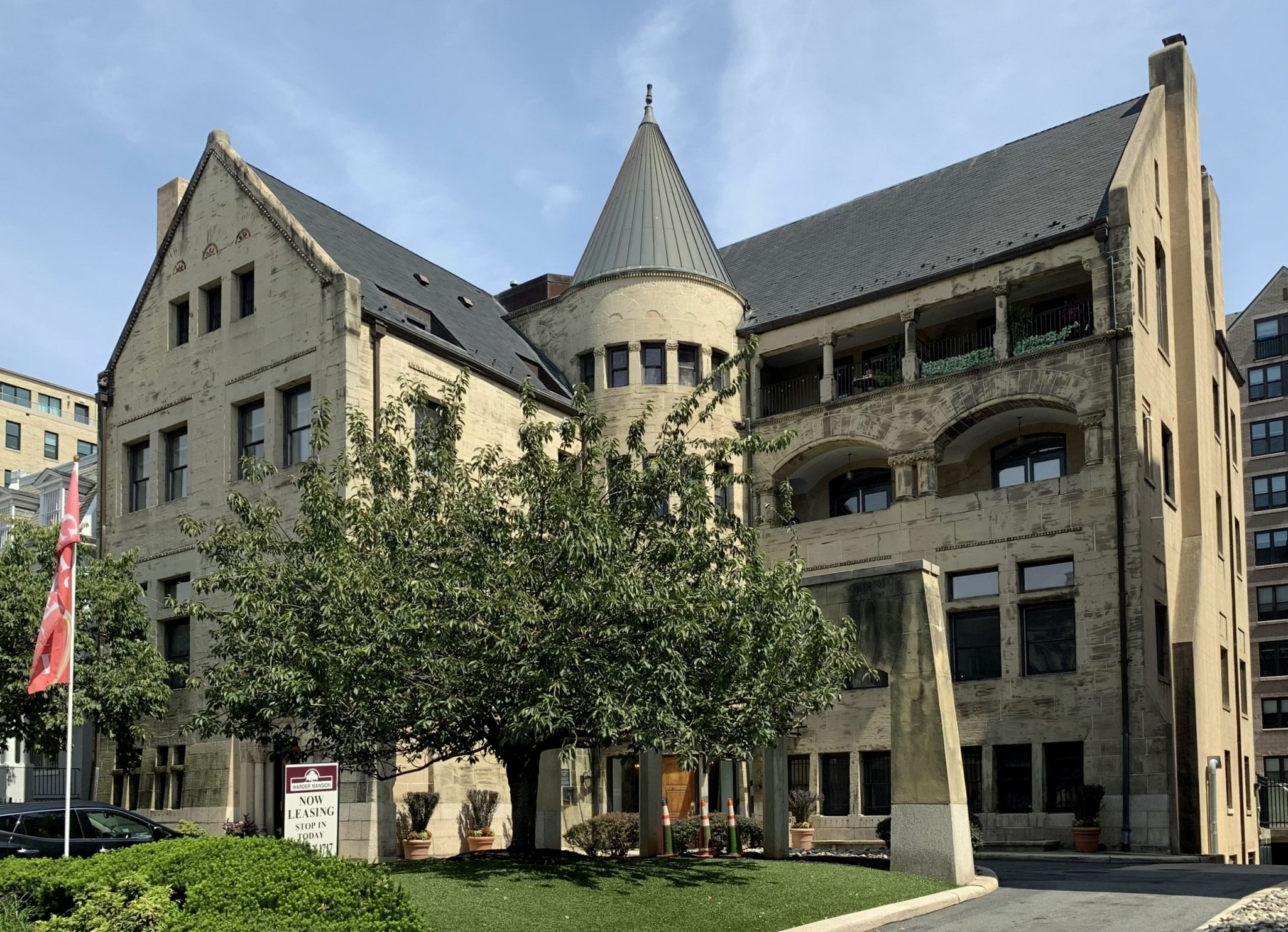
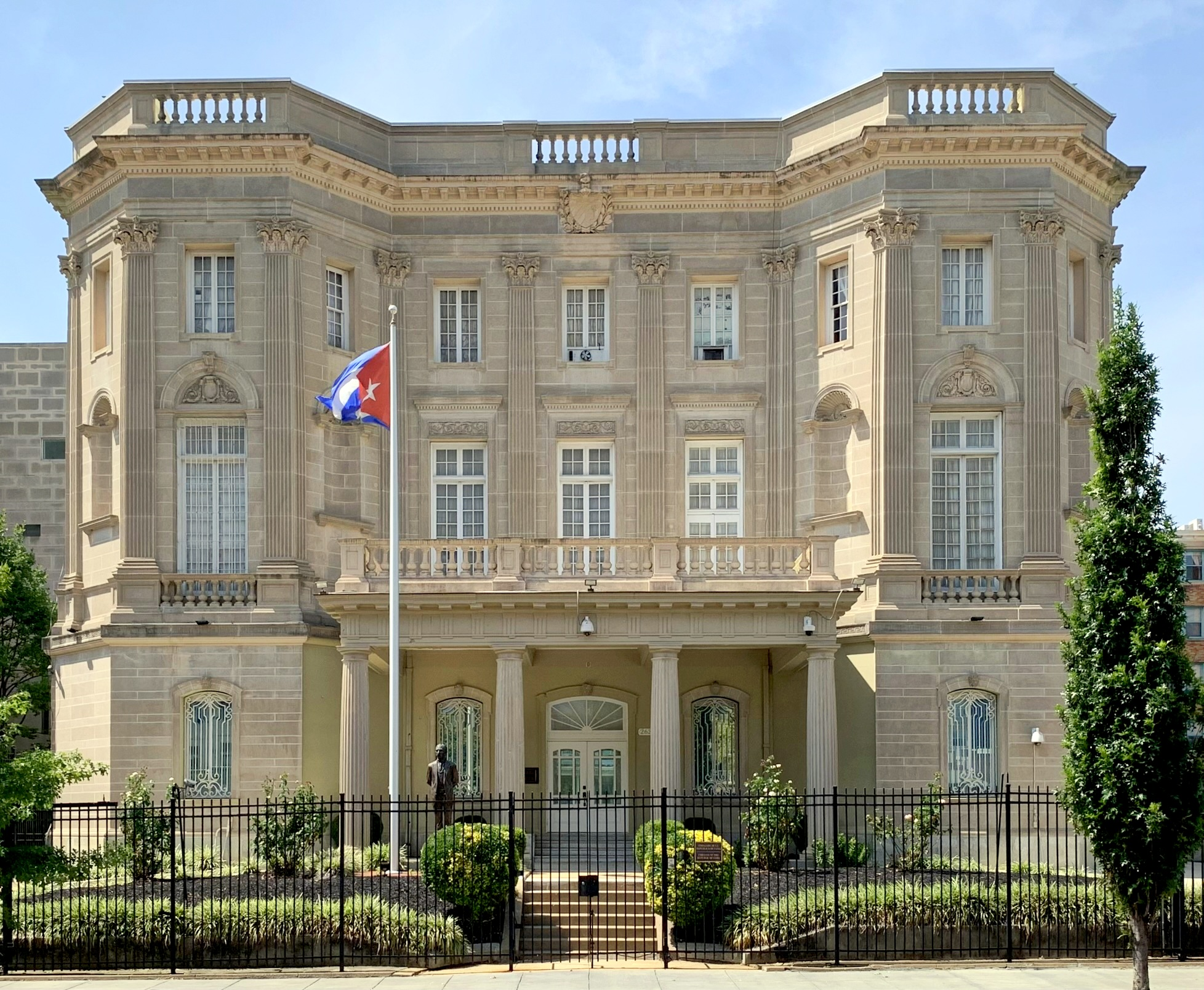
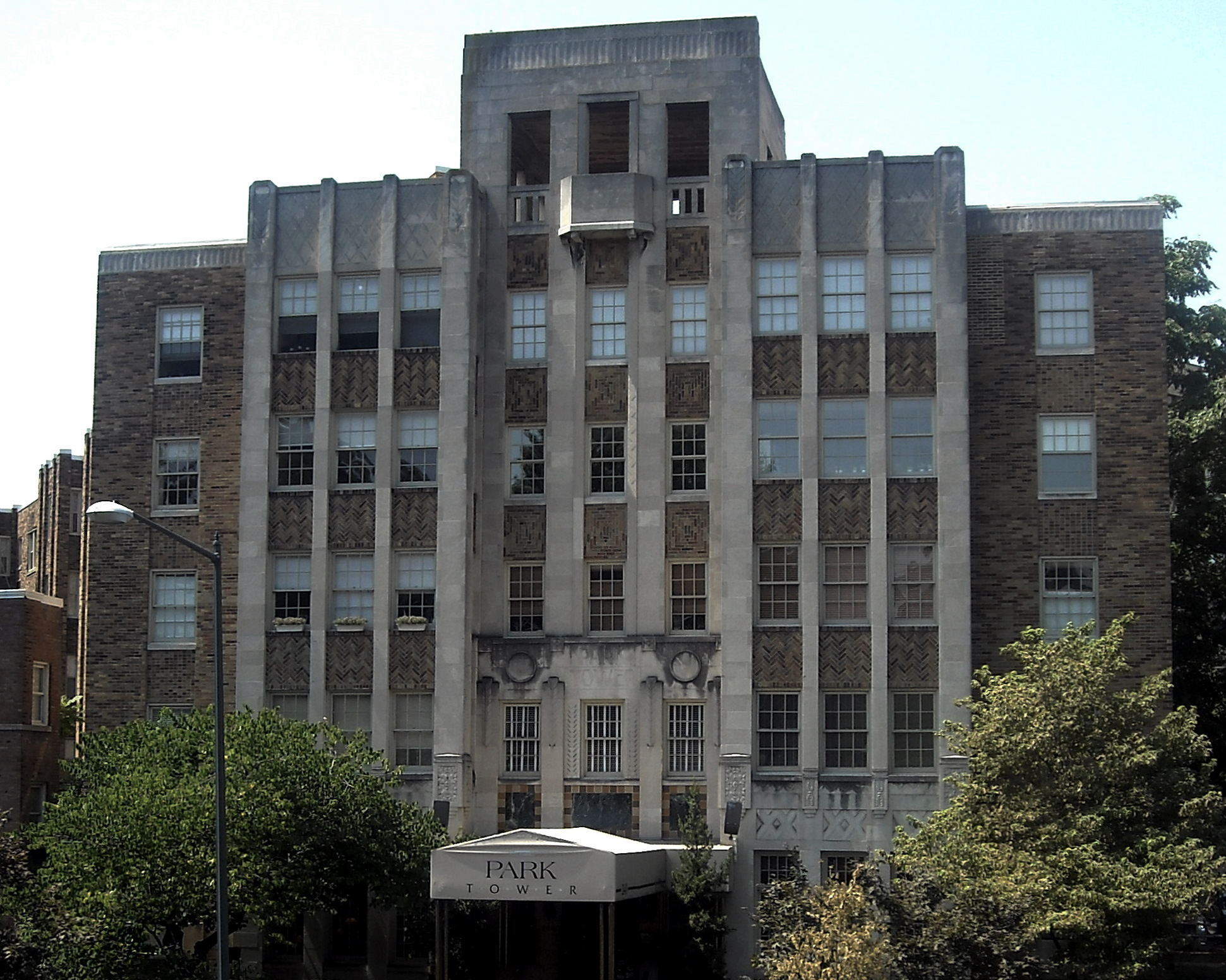
- Top: Meridian Hill Park; middle: Old French Embassy (left) and Warder Mansion (right); bottom: Cuban Embassy (left) and Park Tower (right).
- Interactive map of Meridian Hill
- Country: United States
- District: Washington, D.C.
- Quadrant: Northwest
- Ward: 1
- Postal code: ZIP Code

Meridian Hill is a small urban neighborhood in Washington, D.C., located in Northwest D.C. Meridian Hill is often considered to be a part of the larger neighborhoods of Adams Morgan and Columbia Heights, which it sits between. The neighborhood is primarily residential, though it also hosts a number of diplomatic missions and embassies.

Meridian Hill was developed as part of the City Beautiful movement in the late 19th century, when socialite Mary Foote Henderson embarked on a major initiative to turn Meridian Hill into the city's most prestigious area. While the neighborhood lured many prominent figures to build mansions and embassies, Henderson did not achieve her goal of building a new Presidential Mansion on the central area of the hill, which was eventually developed into Meridian Hill Park.

== History ==
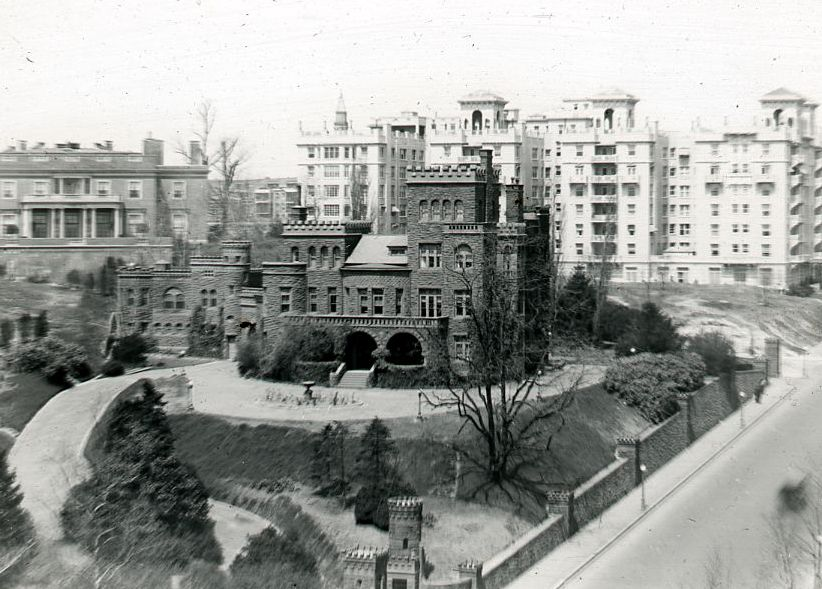
Henderson Castle was built in 1889 for Mary Foote Henderson, who developed Meridian Hill into a fashionable area for Washington's elite.

At the time of the District of Columbia's creation in 1791, the area of present-day Meridian Hill was owned by Robert Peter and was known as Peter's Hill. In 1804, President Thomas Jefferson had a geodetic marker placed on the hill, centered exactly north of the White House, which established the White House meridian, which would eventually give the hill its current name.

Commodore David Porter acquired the hill in 1816 as part of a 110-acre (450,000 m^{2}) tract of land and named this property "Meridian Hill". Close to the meridian marker, Porter then built a large mansion which he also named Meridian Hill, which had a panoramic view of the White House and the Potomac River. Following his presidential term, John Quincy Adams briefly lived at Meridian Hill.

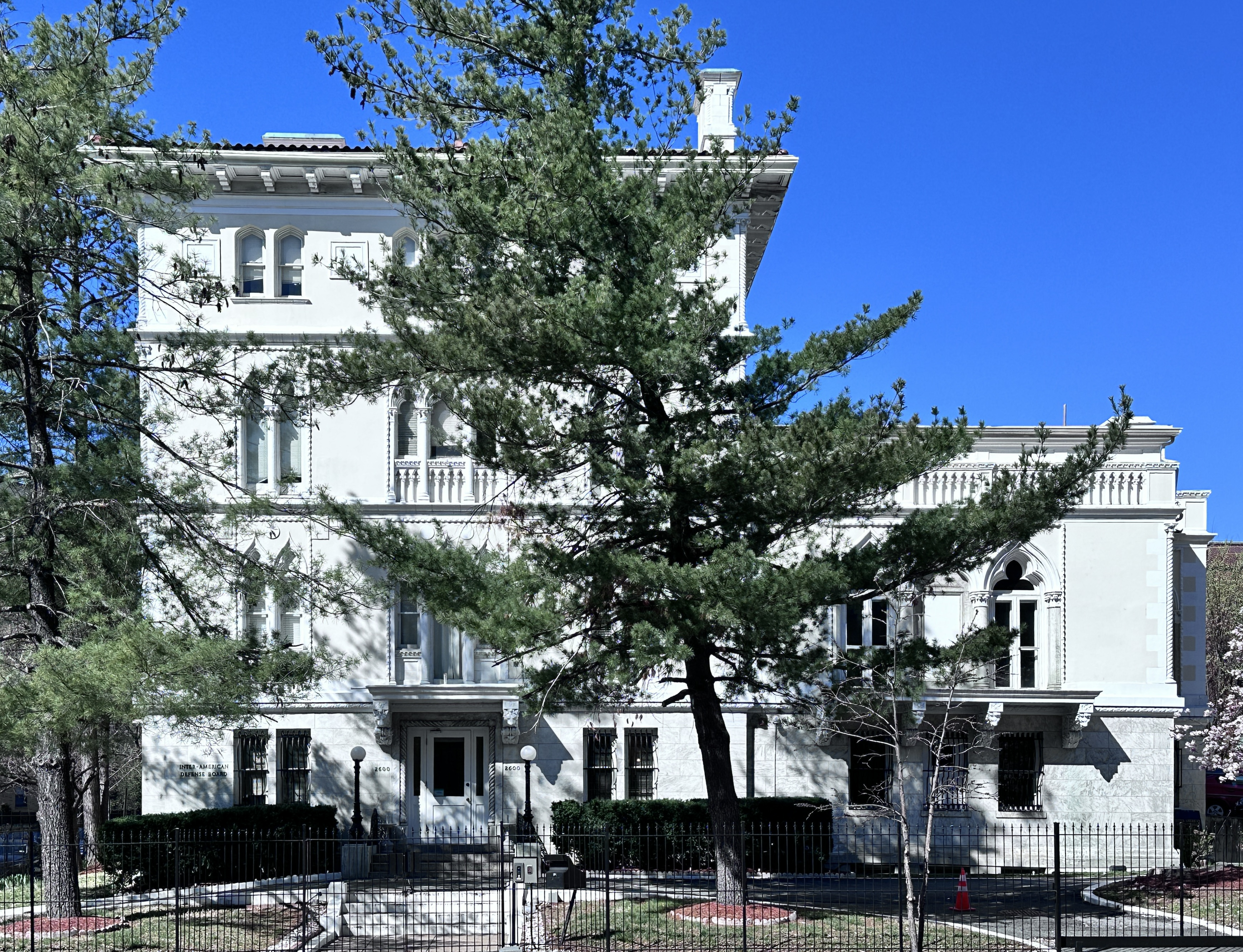
The Pink Palace, built in 1906, is now home to the Inter-American Defense Board.

Following the onset of the U.S. Civil War, much of the Meridian Hill estate and the neighboring lands of Columbian College (modern-day George Washington University) were commandeered by the U.S. Army for use as a military encampment named Camp Cameron.

In 1867, the Porter estate was subdivided into smaller lots for real estate development. In 1887, former senator John Brooks Henderson and his wife Mary Foote Henderson purchased a large number of these real estate lots. Mary, with many friends in U.S. Congress, had grand plans for the area and for the public use of the hill, hoping to transform the area into the most prestigious neighborhood in D.C.

She put forward, without success, two ambitious proposals to build a presidential mansion on the hill to replace the White House; one by architect Paul J. Pelz in 1898 and the second by Franklin W. Smith in 1900. She next unsuccessfully proposed that the site be used for the planned Lincoln Memorial. Henderson and architect George Oakley Totten Jr. planned and built a succession of large, elaborate embassies and mansions along both 15th and 16th streets, including her own family estate known as Henderson Castle.

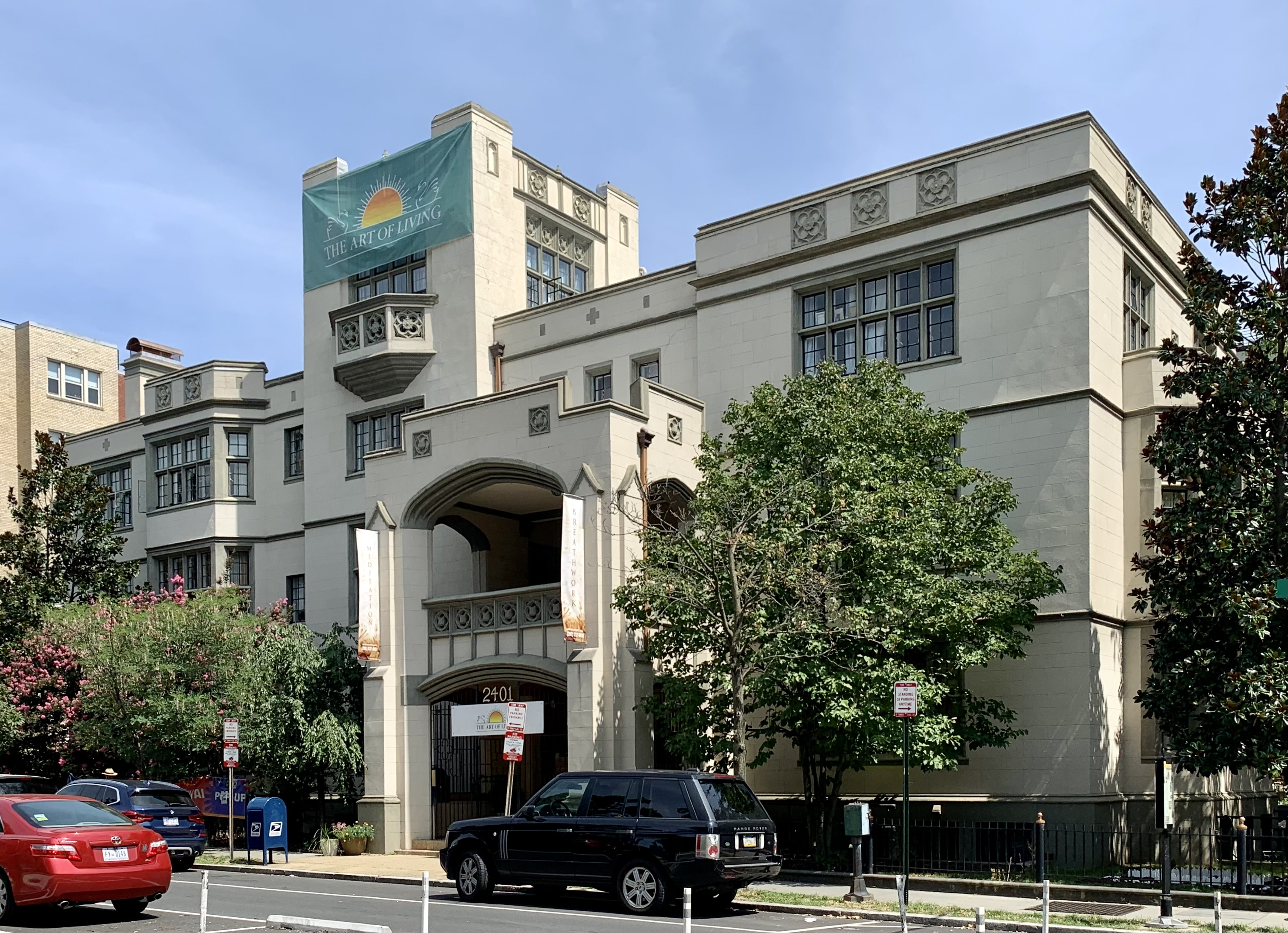
Meridian Hall is the headquarters of the Art of Living Foundation.

In 1901, the U.S. Senate's McMillan Commission undertook a set of formal changes to Washington's civic appearance, most famously by reconfiguring the city's National Mall. The commission also decided, with Mary's input, that a park on Meridian Hill was appropriate, and proceeded to plan for its creation. By an Act of Congress on June 25, 1910, Meridian Hill Park was established. The federal government also purchased the land for the park in 1910, and began planning for its construction in 1912, with the Interior Department hiring landscape architect George Burnap to design a grand urban park modeled on parks found in European capitals. His plans were approved in early 1914, and later were modified by Horace Peaslee. After two decades under construction, the grounds were declared essentially complete, given park status, and then dedicated in 1936.

The Meridian International Center was established in 1960, at Meridian House. The center later absorbed the neighboring White-Meyer House in 1987. Both estates were designed by John Russell Pope, in 1912 and 1920, respectively.

At a political rally in 1969, activist Angela Davis proposed renaming the Meridian Hill Park after Malcolm X, but this name change was not approved, though some continue to call the park Malcolm X Park.

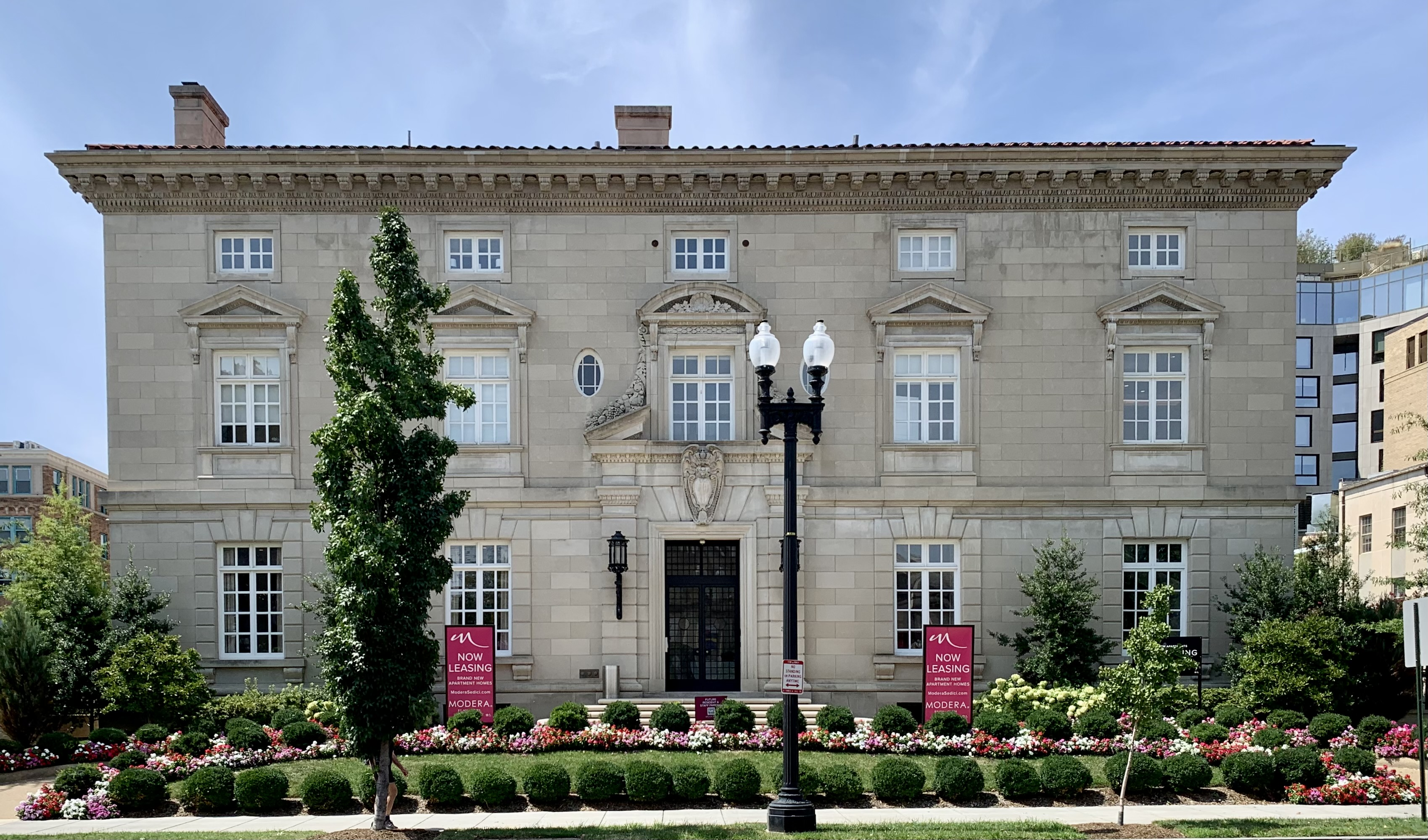
Old Italian Embassy, redeveloped into luxury apartments in 2018.

After 1970, with inner-city areas of Washington experiencing an economic decline, the park and its neighborhood suffered some decay for a number of years, with crime and vandalism becoming a problem. About 1990, in response to rising crime rates in and around the park, neighborhood residents became more involved in the park's stewardship and programming, and a group of community organizations formed the Friends of Meridian Hill.

In 1994, in recognition of the impact of the Friends of Meridian Hill, president Bill Clinton presented the Friends of Meridian Hill with the Partnership Leadership Award in a White House ceremony. In 1994, Meridian Hill Park was designated a National Historic Landmark, as "an outstanding accomplishment of early 20th century Neoclassicist park design in the United States".

In 2014 the District of Columbia government approved creation of the "Meridian Hill Historic District".

Meridian Hill has experienced urban redevelopment in the 2000s.

== Landmarks ==
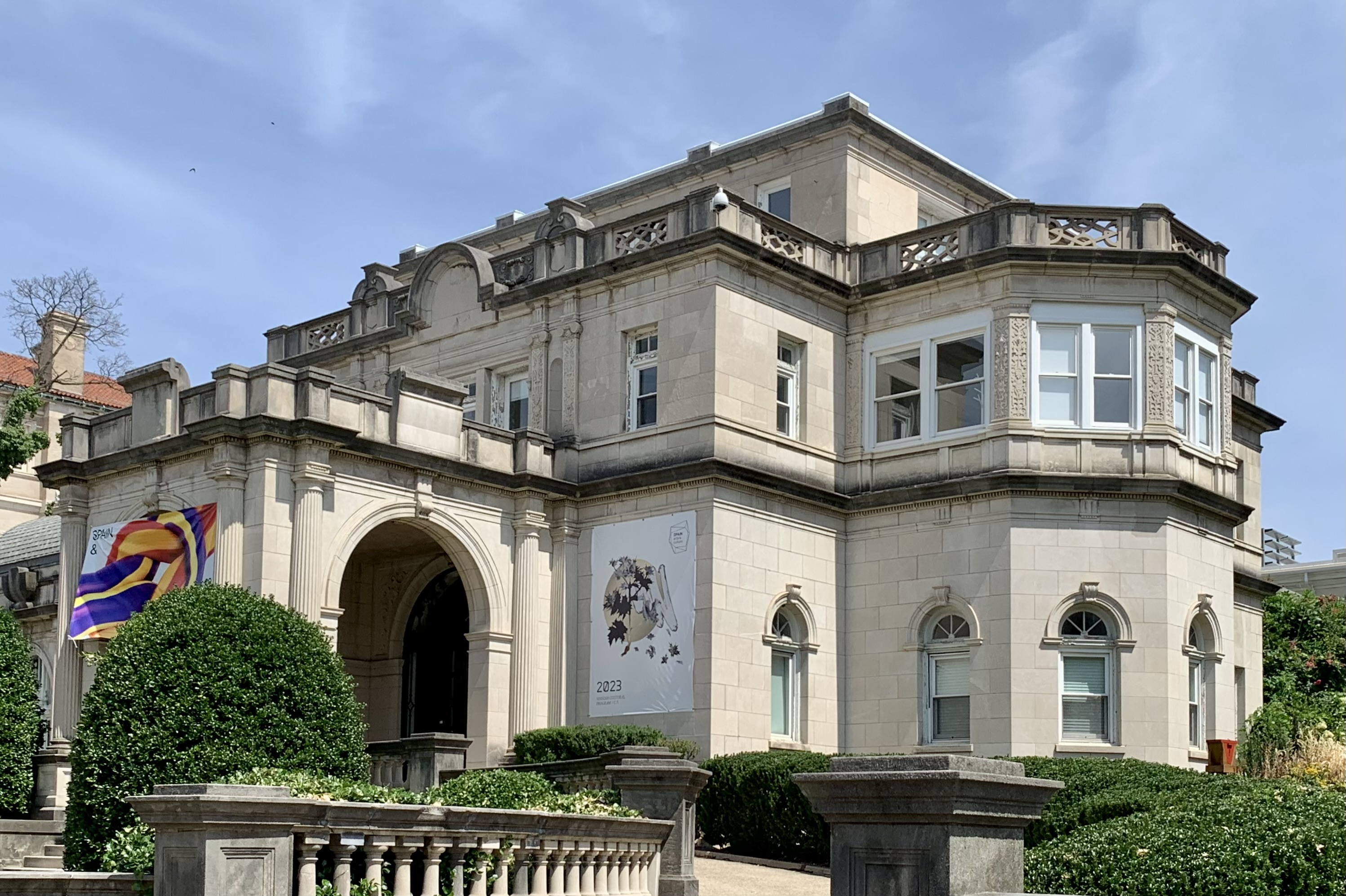
Spanish Embassy Cultural Center.

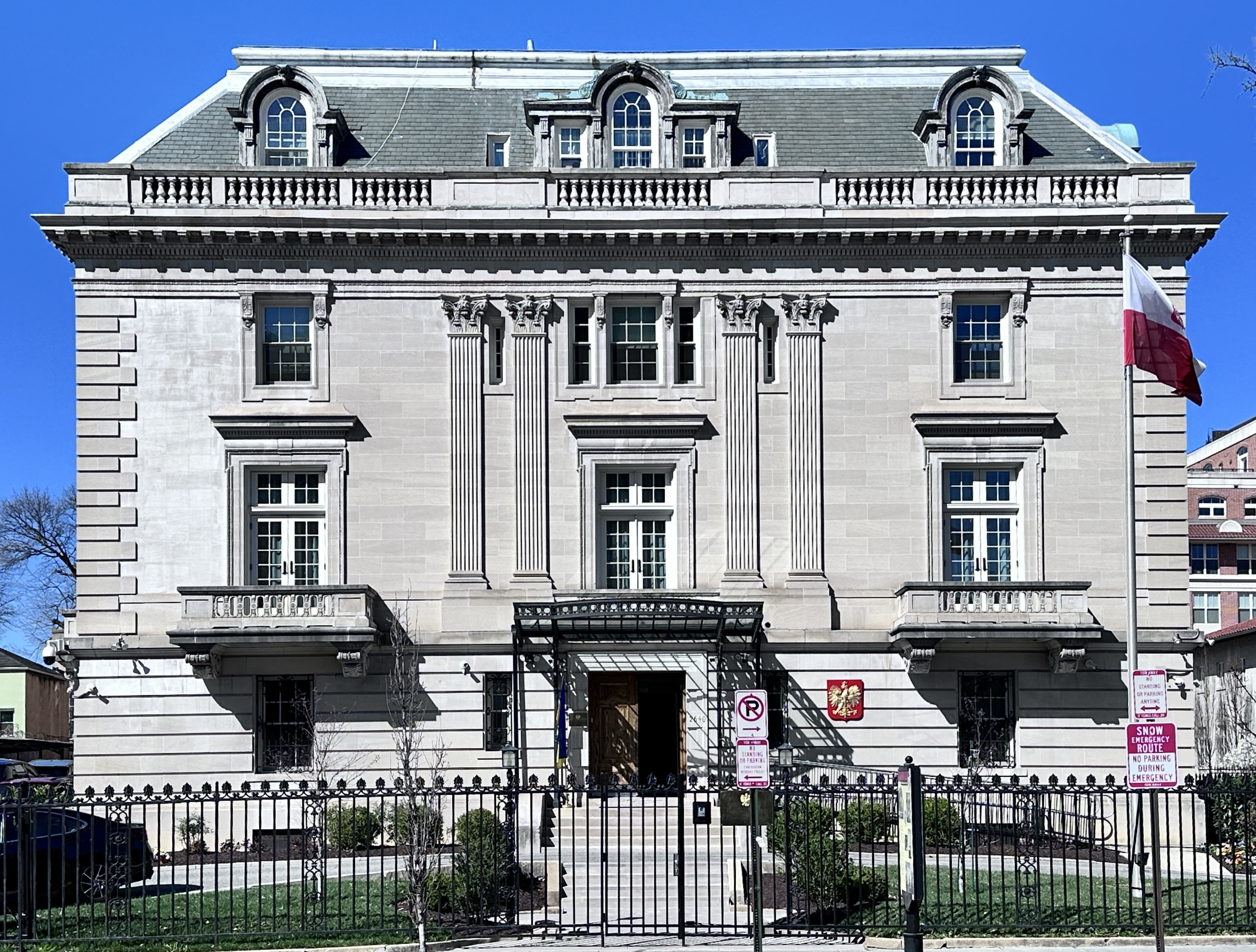
Embassy of Poland

Meridian Hill is home to a number of embassies and diplomatic buildings, including:

- Embassy of Poland
- Embassy of Cuba
- Embassy of Lithuania
- Embassy of Ecuador
- Embassy of Mexico - Cultural Center
- Embassy of Spain - Cultural Center

There a numerous National Register of Historic Place listings in the neighborhood, including Meridian House, the White-Meyer House, Meridian Hall, Meridian Manor, Meridian Mansions, the Pink Palace, and the Warder Mansion, among others.

The Josephine Butler Parks Center is the headquarters of Washington Parks and People, housed in the Old Hungarian Embassy building.

The Inter-American Defense Board is headquartered at the Pink Palace.

The Meridian International Center is headquartered at Meridian House and the White-Meyer House.

Meridian Hill Park is a national historic landmark and also home to numerous landmarks within itself, including the James Buchanan Memorial, the Cascading Waterfall, the Equestrian statue of Joan of Arc, the Dante Alighieri statue, and the Serenity statue.

== Local politics ==
Meridian Hill is a part of Ward 1, and is in the service area of Advisory Neighborhood Commissions 1A, 1B, and 1C.

== Notable residents ==
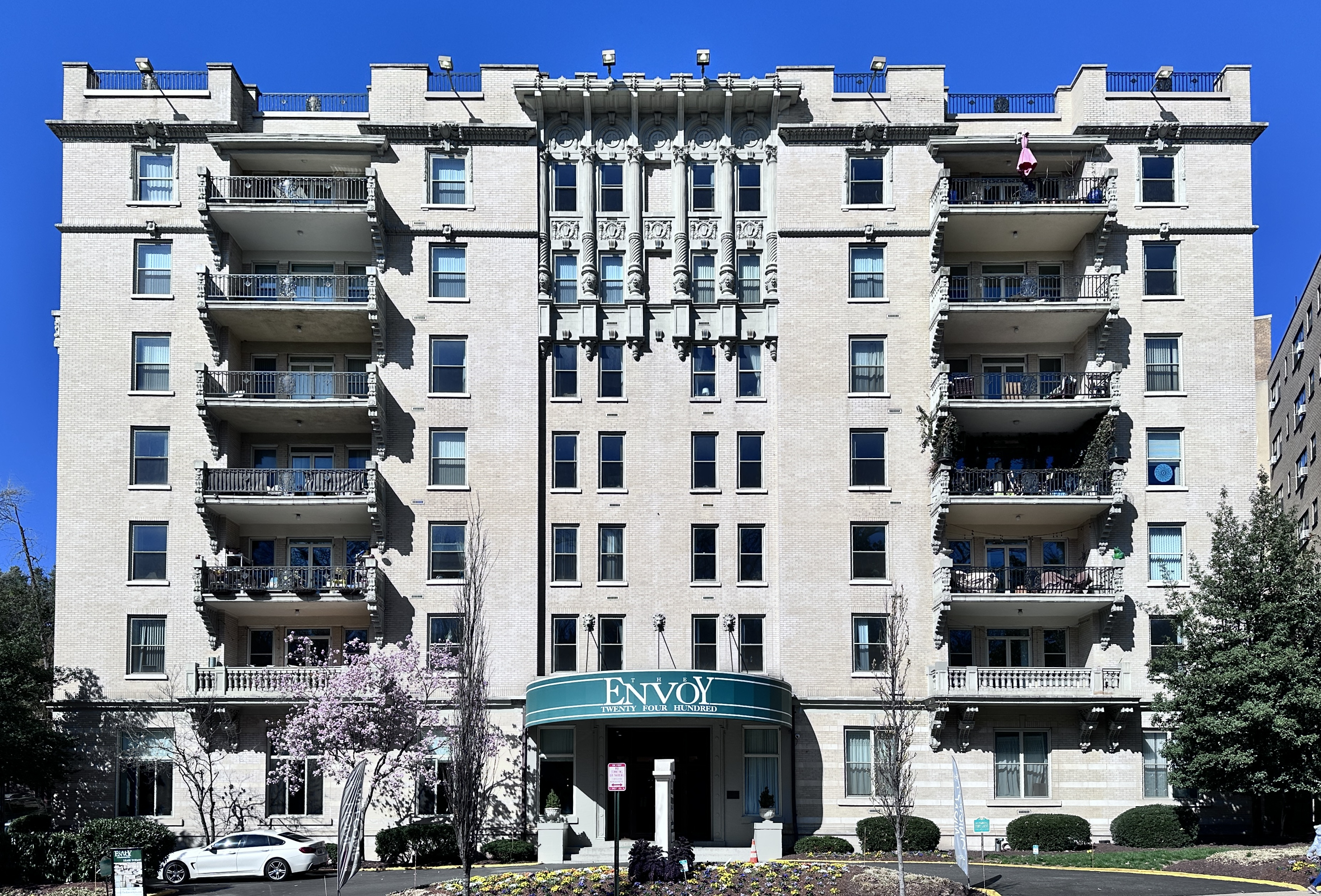
Meridian Mansions was home to Tomáš Masaryk, first President of Czechoslovakia, while he was drafting the Washington Declaration. It was also the site where the Flag of Czechoslovakia was first flown.

- Tomáš Masaryk, first President of Czechoslovakia
- Kazimierz Lubomirski, Polish prince and diplomat
- Irwin B. Laughlin, American diplomat
- Henry White, American diplomat
- Eugene Meyer, American financier and newspaper publisher
- John Campbell White, American diplomat
- Mary Foote Henderson, American socialite
- John B. Henderson, U.S. Senator

== See also ==
- Meridian Hill Park
