= Ronald Mc-Intyre Mendoza =

Chilean Army general (1927–2015)

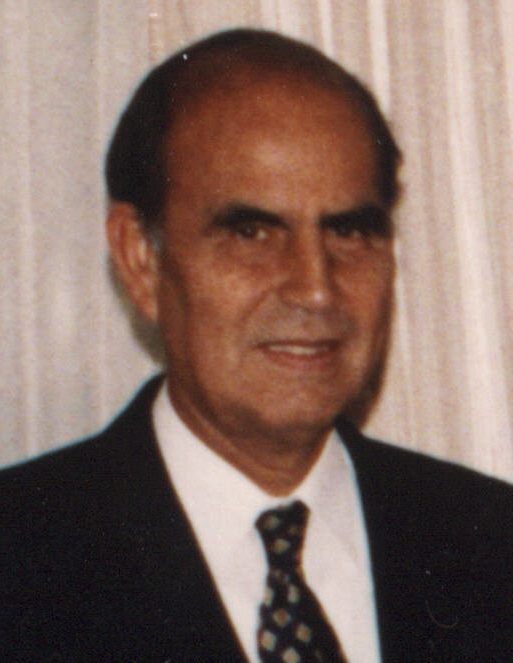

Designed Senator
- In office 11 March 1990 – 11 March 1998
- Constituency: Valparaíso Region

Personal details
- Born: 2 May 1927 Tocopilla, Chile
- Died: 9 August 2015 (aged 88) Vina del Mar, Chile
- Spouse: Carmen Astorga
- Children: Three
- Education: Arturo Prat Naval Academy
- Profession: Marine

Ronald Mc-Intyre Mendoza (born 2 May 1927 – 9 August 2015) was a Chilean Army general, who served as senator.

== Biography ==
=== Family and youth ===
He was born in Tocopilla in May 1927. He married Carmen Astorga Paulsen and was the father of three children: Ronald, Carmen, and Jaime.

== Professional career ==
After completing his schooling, he entered the Arturo Prat Naval Academy in 1941, graduating in 1946.

He served in the Chilean Navy for 42 years. Throughout his naval career, he held positions including Staff Officer, Head of Studies at the Naval Academy, professor at the Naval War Academy, and commander of the vessels AGS Yelcho, DD Riveros, and AO Araucanos.

In 1951, following his assignment to the Navy Telecommunications School, he traveled to the United States to serve as Deputy Naval Attaché at the Embassy of Chile in Washington, D.C., where he completed the C.I.C. course.

Upon his return, between 1953 and 1954, he served as a C.I.C. officer aboard the cruiser O'Higgins. He later returned to the Naval Academy as an instructor and, in 1956, held the same position at the Navy School of Electronics and Telecommunications.

In 1957, he was appointed Head of the Operations Department of the cruiser Prat. Between 1958 and 1959, he pursued advanced studies at the Naval War Academy.

From 1963 to 1965, he served as Head of Studies at the Naval Academy, and in 1966 became a professor at the Naval War Academy. In subsequent years, he held several senior command positions, including Chief of Staff of the Third Naval Zone (1971–1973) and Secretary General of the Commander-in-Chief of the Navy (1974–1975).

Between 1976 and 1977, he served as Naval Attaché to the Chilean Embassies in the United States and Canada, and as Head of the Chilean Naval Mission in Washington and before the Inter-American Defense Board.

In 1978, he was appointed Chief of Staff of the Commander-in-Chief of the Navy and later Commander-in-Chief of the National Fleet. In 1980, he was appointed Chief of the National Defense General Staff, a position he held until his retirement in 1982.

After retiring from active naval service, he continued his academic work as a professor of Planning and, from 1984, of Political-Strategic Leadership at the Naval War Academy. He also served as a professor at the National Academy of Political and Strategic Studies (ANEPE) between 1984 and 1989.

In 1987, he was appointed advisor to the Ministry of Foreign Affairs of Chile in the negotiating commission with Peru regarding the 1929 Treaty.

=== Appointed Senator ===
On 19 December 1989, he was appointed Institutional Senator by the National Security Council, representing the Chilean Navy, for the legislative period 1990–1998.

He died in Viña del Mar on 9 August 2015.
