= Meridian Hall =

Meridian Hall may refer to:

- Meridian Hall (Toronto), a performing arts centre in Canada
- Meridian Hall (Washington, D.C.), a mansion and historical site in USA
- Meridian City Hall, Meridian, Mississippi, USA
