= Josephine Butler (activist) =

American activist (1920–1987)

- Born: January 24, 1920; Brandywine, Maryland, U.S.
- Died: March 29, 1997 (aged 77); Washington, D.C., U.S.
- Education: Strayer University
- Occupation: Activist
- Spouse: Jack Brown (divorced)

Josephine Dorothy Butler (January 24, 1920 ― March 29, 1997) was an American activist. She co-founded and was chairman of the D.C. Statehood Party to combat the lack of selected representation in congress for her district. Butler played a significant role in the desegregation and merging of two neighborhood schools into one, the Adams-Morgan elementary school. She also was the founder of one of the first black women's unions in the DC area.

== Early life ==
Butler was born in Brandywine, Maryland, on January 24, 1920, as one of nine children of African-American tobacco sharecroppers Joseph and Helen Arabelle Jenifer. Butler and other students attended school in shanties in the woods until it became possible to attend the newly-constructed Frederick Douglass High School in Upper Marlboro, Maryland. Some local whites violently opposed black education, stoning school buses and threatening parents. Butler recalled, "They saw that if we got more education we would go to the city and get better jobs and then white farm owners would have no one to work in their fields." As a result of Butler's school attendance, her father lost work, forcing her mother to work in Washington, D.C., as a live-in domestic servant. She then attended Strayer University.

== Activism and career ==
In 1934, Butler married Jack Brown at the age of 14, and moved to Washington, DC, lying about her age to secure work as a laundress. Butler's husband was a hob carrier in the construction field when they married. He later worked his way up to shop steward and was a member of the Laborers Union in D.C. Both began organizing laborers in their respective industries, and Butler organized the first black women's laundry workers union. Late in the 1930s, Butler heard Paul Robeson and Henry A. Wallace speak about the fight for racial justice in America. Butler described it as "like an awakening of something that was dormant.", deciding to join the fight for progressive social change.

In the 1940s, Butler worked in government cafeterias and organized cafeteria workers. Durning the second World War, Butler became a clerk in the United States Veterans Administration. However, the VA dismissed Butler in 1949 in a "loyalty" purge. This was during an attempt to oust members of the communist party. While Butler did not have membership with the Communist Party, she did show support for CIO-affiliated cafeteria workers on the picket line. Butler separated from her husband and moved to Bethesda, Maryland. Butler later discovered she was blacklisted from further government employment.

After the landmark case of Brown versus the Board of Education of 1954, Butler became a leading figure in the merge of two public elementary schools. Leading the charge, she worked to combine then all-white John Quincy Adams Elementary School and then all-black Thomas P. Morgan Elementary School in 1955. This led to the new school being named the Adams-Morgan elementary school. As a result of her activism, the surrounding neighborhood also changed its name to the Adams-Morgan neighborhood.

Butler spent several years in the late 1950s and early 1960s incapacitated with tuberculosis of the kidney. Following her recovery, Butler volunteered with the District of Columbia Lung Association, which later hired her to design educational programs for children. In 1967, Butler organized her co-workers and formed Local 2 of the Office and Professional Employees International Union, making her workplace the first unionized lung association. She retired around 1980.

Butler became an active volunteer with the local Democratic Party, serving as chair of District 15. However, she was disenchanted with the police violence at the 1968 Democratic National Convention in Chicago and decided "there was something better I could be doing with my time politically". That was the D. C. Statehood Party, which Butler co-founded in 1971 with Julius Hobson. This was to challenge the community's lack of elected congressional representation while residing in a federal district controlled by Congress. Butlers' dedication for representation was spurred by the fight surrounding the Highway Act of 1968.

It proposed building a major highway traversing the length of the Potomac River and an interstate that would have ran through Northeast DC. These plans would have displaced thousands of families in the area. While her activism swayed the council members to remove the freeways, it also resulted in repercussions from higher above council members. Chair Member William Natcher - Representative for the DC House Appropriations Committee’s Subcommittee - threatened withholding federal funding if the freeways were not pushed through. Butler ran for the D.C. Council as a party candidate in 1974 and 1976 but was unsuccessful both times.

Butler was co-chair of Friends of Meridian Hill, a group dedicated to rehabilitating Meridian Hill Park in northwest D.C., This was rooted in efforts to create safe, beautiful spaces for community gathering and family and children enjoyment. In 1994, she introduced President Bill Clinton at an Earth Day speech in the park. Clinton later awarded Butler the National Partnership-Leadership Award. The following year, she organized an Earth Day parade of 4,000 people to the United States Capitol, where she addressed a crowd of 250,000.

== Personal ==
Butler married Jack Brown. They divorced, and she took up the last name Butler.

== Death ==
Butler died at Medlink Hospital in Washington, D.C., on March 29, 1997. She was survived by her four sisters Helen Antoinette Birchmore, Lucy Ellen Cardwell, Emma Louise Dodson, Lelia Ernestine Taylor; her brother, Robert Calvin Jenifer, and her mother Helen Arabelle Jenifer.

== Legacy ==
Josephine Butler Parks Center was named to honor her life and legacy. To honor her memory and political activism in surrounding environmental issues and community, the Washington group Parks and People memorialized the Park Center by naming it to the Josephine Butler Parks Center.
