= Park Tower (Washington, D.C.) =

- U.S. National Register of Historic Places
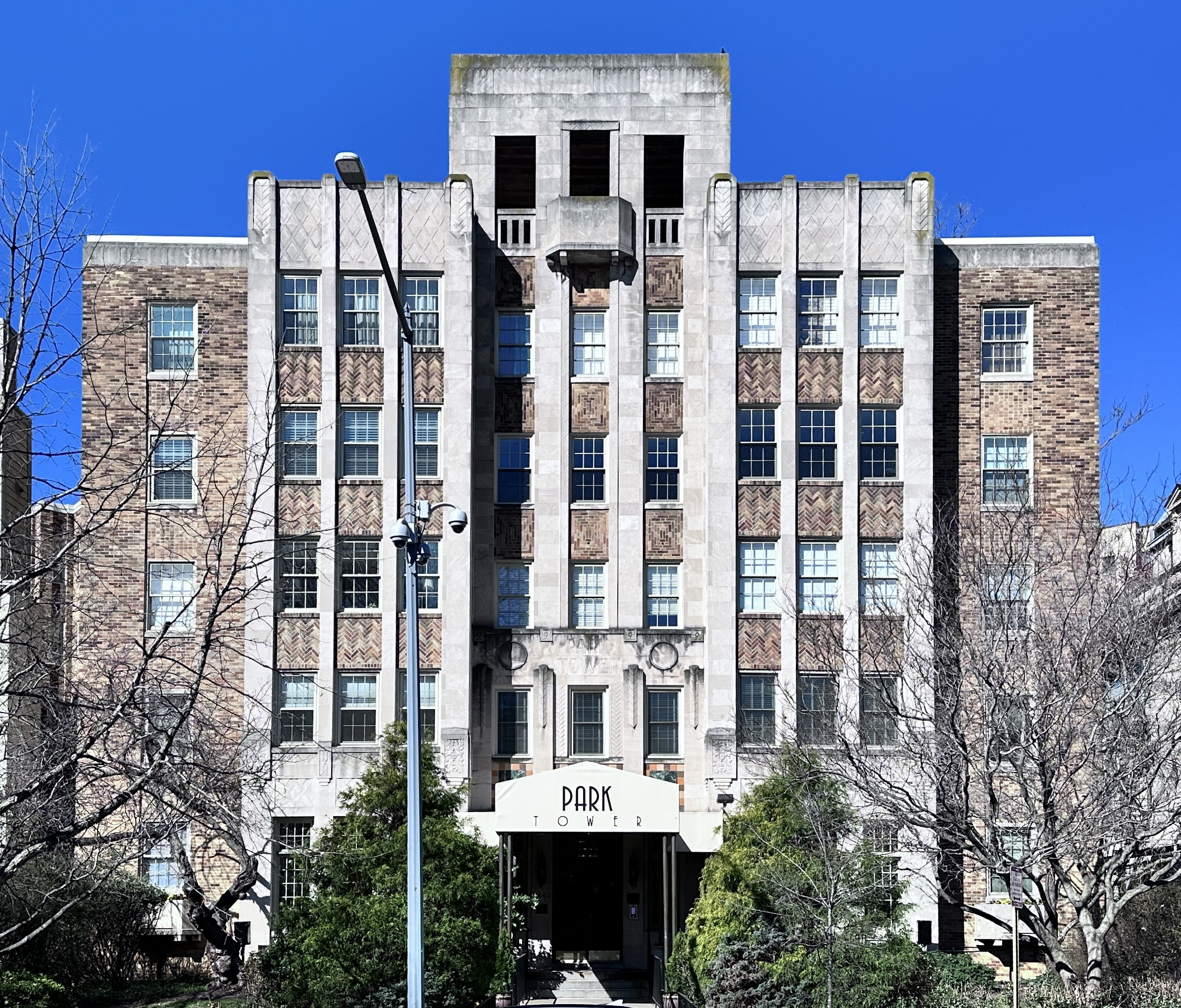
- Park Tower in 2025

- Location within Washington, D.C.
- Location: 2440 Sixteenth St., NW; Washington, D.C.
- Coordinates: 38°55′19″N 77°2′14″W
- Built: 1928-1929
- Architect: William Harris
- Architectural style: Art Deco
- MPS: Apartment Buildings in Washington, DC, MPS
- NRHP reference No.: 89001744
- Added to NRHP: October 30, 1989

The Park Tower is an historic structure located in the Meridian Hill neighborhood of Washington, D.C. It has been listed on the District of Columbia Inventory of Historic Sites since 1988, and was listed on the National Register of Historic Places in 1989.

== History ==
William Harris designed the structure, which was completed in 1929. It was one of the first buildings in the city to break away from the Beaux-Arts and Colonial Revival styles that predominated in Washington architecture up to that time. The building was home to congressmen, professionals and other notable people in the 1930s and illustrates the desire to maintain Sixteenth Street as fashionable street on which to reside.

== Architecture ==
The five-story structure features an irregular plan with a ziggurat-like main façade. The rooftop loggia rises above squared bays. The exterior is a series of repetitive bays covered in golden buff-colored brick. The building also features limestone and patterned brick with chevron, diaper and oak leaf motifs.
