= Meridian High School =

Meridian High School may refer to:

== United States ==
- Meridian High School (Idaho), Meridian, Idaho
- Meridian Technical Charter High School, Meridian, Idaho
- Meridian High School (Macon, Illinois), Macon, Illinois
- Meridian High School (Mounds, Illinois), Mounds, Illinois
- Perry Meridian High School, Indianapolis, Indiana
- Meridian High School (Michigan), Sanford, Michigan
- Meridian High School (Mississippi), Meridian, Mississippi
- Meridian High School (Daykin, Nebraska), Daykin, Nebraska
- Cato-Meridian High School, Cato, New York
- Meridian High School (Texas), Meridian, Texas
- Meridian High School (Virginia), Falls Church, Virginia
- Meridian High School (Washington), Bellingham, Washington
- Kent-Meridian High School, Kent, Washington

== Other countries ==
- Meridian School, a high school in Hyderabad, India
- Meridian High School, Croydon, London, England

== See also ==
- Meridian (disambiguation)
