= Meridian, Oklahoma =

Meridian may refer to:

- Meridian, Logan County, Oklahoma, town
- Meridian, Stephens County, Oklahoma, CDP

== See also ==
- Indian meridian, governs the surveys in Oklahoma east of 100° west longitude (non-panhandle)
- Cimarron meridian, governs the surveys in Oklahoma west of 100° west longitude (panhandle)
