= Meridian, California =

Meridian, California may refer to:

- Meridian, Humboldt County, California
- Meridian, Sutter County, California

== See also ==
- 120th meridian west, the line of longitude defining the Pacific Time Zone (which includes California)
