= Washington Parks and People =

Washington Parks and People is an alliance of community urban park partnerships based at the Josephine Butler Parks Center in the Columbia Heights (Washington, D.C.) neighborhood in Northwest Washington, DC. The organization's field headquarters, the Riverside Center, is located in a former nightclub in Northeast Washington, DC, next to the center of Marvin Gaye Park. Washington Parks & People and its community partners manage environmental reclamation, tree planting, and park programming by community volunteers and trainees.

Washington Parks and People logo

Washington Parks & People is known for its work in the transformation of Marvin Gaye Park, formerly Watts Branch Park, in Northeast Washington, DC. The organization was incorporated in 1990 as Friends of Meridian Hill, focused on assisting the National Park Service and the US Park Police with the reclamation of Meridian Hill Park. The Meridian Hill/Malcolm X park partnership earned the organization the Partnership Leadership Award from the National Park Foundation and the President of the United States, who came to the Park to honor the community's work on April 21, 1994.

Washington Parks & People has developed several urban greening programs which seek to better the outdoor spaces in the District of Columbia. These include the Community Harvest program, a citywide grant and technical assistance program for greening and gardening in under-served areas; Heart & Soul, a park-based public health and fitness initiative; the Walter Pierce Park Archaeology and Master Planning Project; the Cool Capital Challenge community-based energy efficiency drive; the Down by the Riverside Program to transform Marvin Gaye Park; and the Oxon Run Community Alliance Oxon Run Parkway initiative. Most recently, the organization has been responsible for the creation of the North Columbia Heights Green.

In 2011, Washington Parks and People is investing its resources in the DC Green Corps initiative. The Green Corps job training program focuses on urban reforestation, community greening, invasive removal, stream and habitat restoration, park reclamation and stewardship, urban wastewood recovery, environmental justice and health, and green infrastructure controls of urban systems, such as storm and sewer flows. The DC Green Corps initiative was the subject of the 2015 documentary City of Trees.
