= Josephine Butler Parks Center =

Historic house in Washington, D.C., United States

- U.S. National Register of Historic Places
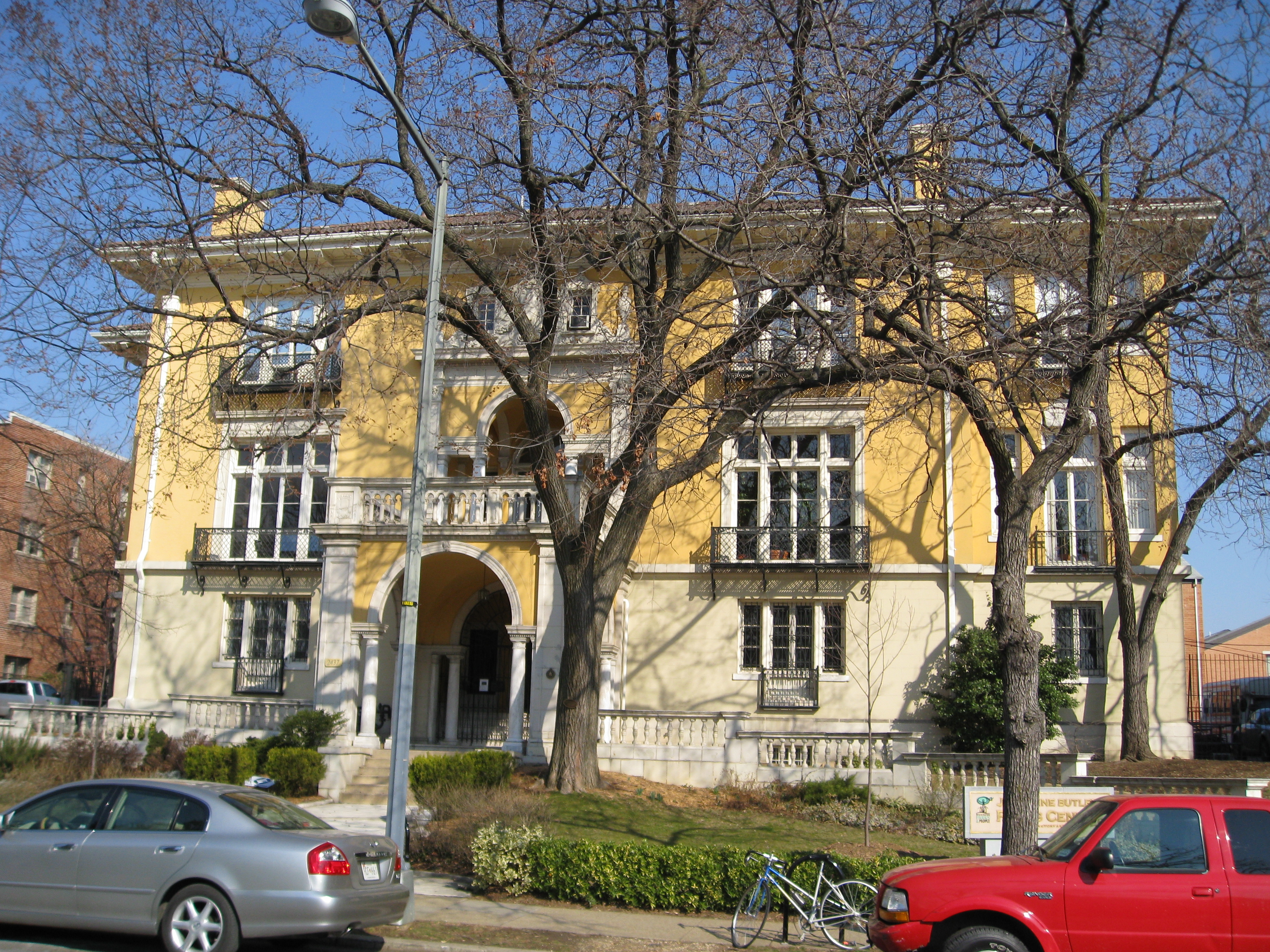

- Location within Washington, D.C.
- Location: 2437 15th Street, NW, Washington, District of Columbia
- Coordinates: 38°55′20″N 77°2′11″W
- Built: 1927
- Architect: George Oakley Totten Jr.
- Architectural style: Renaissance-revival
- NRHP reference No.: 88000171
- Added to NRHP: March 16, 1988

Josephine Butler Parks Center is a historic building in Washington, D.C. and the headquarters of Washington Parks and People, located in the Meridian Hill neighborhood of Northwest D.C. It is housed in the Old Hungarian Embassy, which is listed on the U.S. National Register of Historic Places as House at 2437 Fifteenth Street, NW.

== History ==
The 1927 Renaissance revival house was designed by George Oakley Totten Jr., for Mary Foote Henderson, widow of Senator John B. Henderson.

In 1941, the house was sold to the American Legion. In 1951, it became the embassy of the People's Republic of Hungary. In 1977, it bought by B.C.G. Associates, and rented, In 1982, it was bought by the New China News Agency. In 1987, it was bought by Coolidge House Associates.

The Parks Center is an office for the non-profit Washington Parks and People and was named in honor of environmentalist, labor organizer and activist, Josephine Butler.

== See also ==
- Embassy of Ecuador in Washington, D.C., next door at 2535 Fifteenth St.
