= Pink Palace (Washington, D.C.) =

Historic house in Washington, D.C., United States

- U.S. National Register of Historic Places
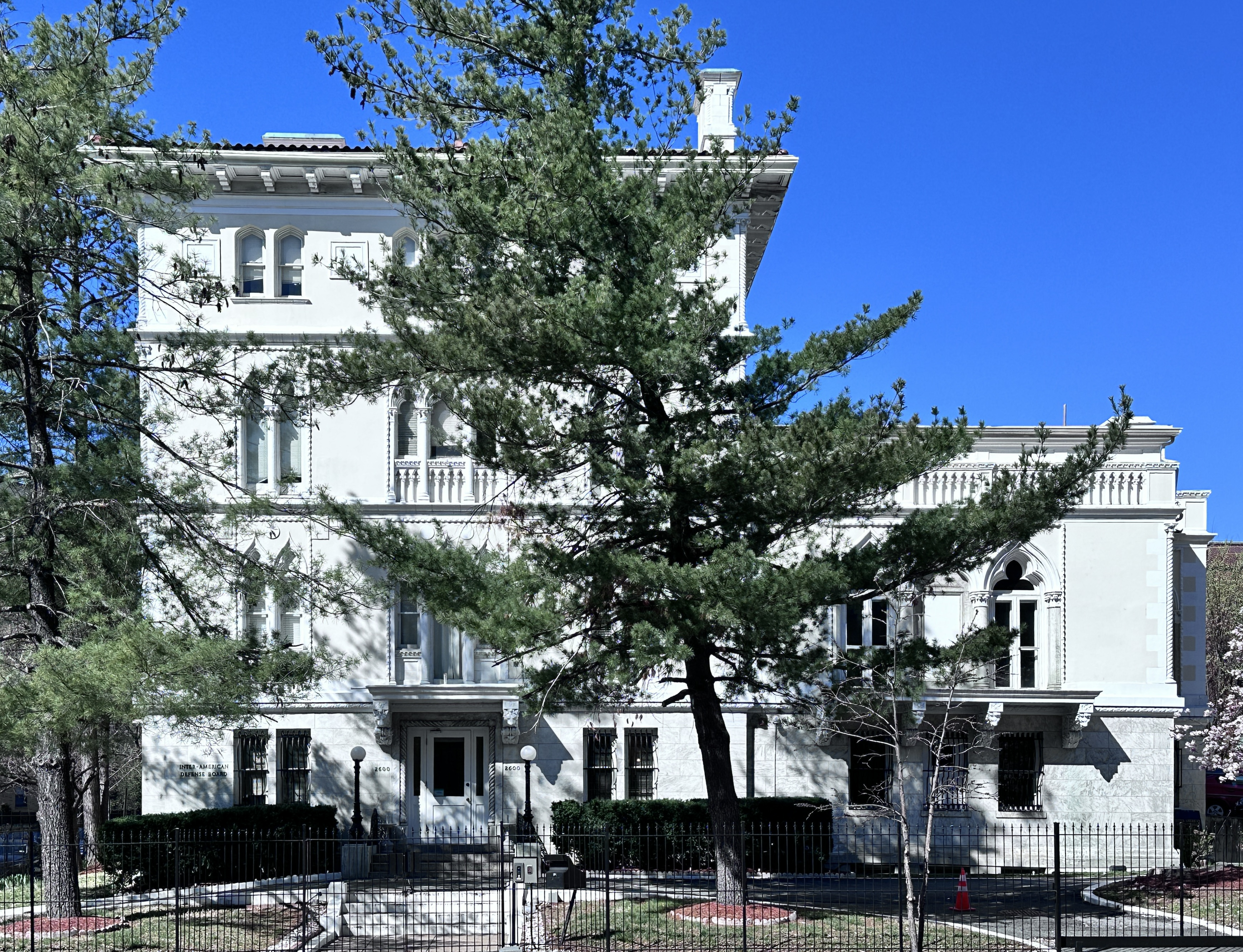
- The building in 2025

- Location within Washington, D.C.
- Location: 2600 16th St., NW; Washington, D.C.
- Coordinates: 38°55′23″N 77°2′13″W
- Built: 1906
- Architect: George Oakley Totten Jr.
- NRHP reference No.: 91000916
- Added to NRHP: August 5, 1991

The Pink Palace, also known as the Mrs. Marshall Field House and the Inter-American Defense Board, is a historic house located in the Meridian Hill neighborhood in Washington, D.C. It has been listed on the National Register of Historic Places since August 5, 1991. George Oakley Totten Jr. was the architect for the structure that was completed in 1906. Additions were made to the house in 1912 and 1988. It has served as the seat of the Inter-American Defense Board since 1945.
