= Meridian Mansions =

- U.S. National Register of Historic Places
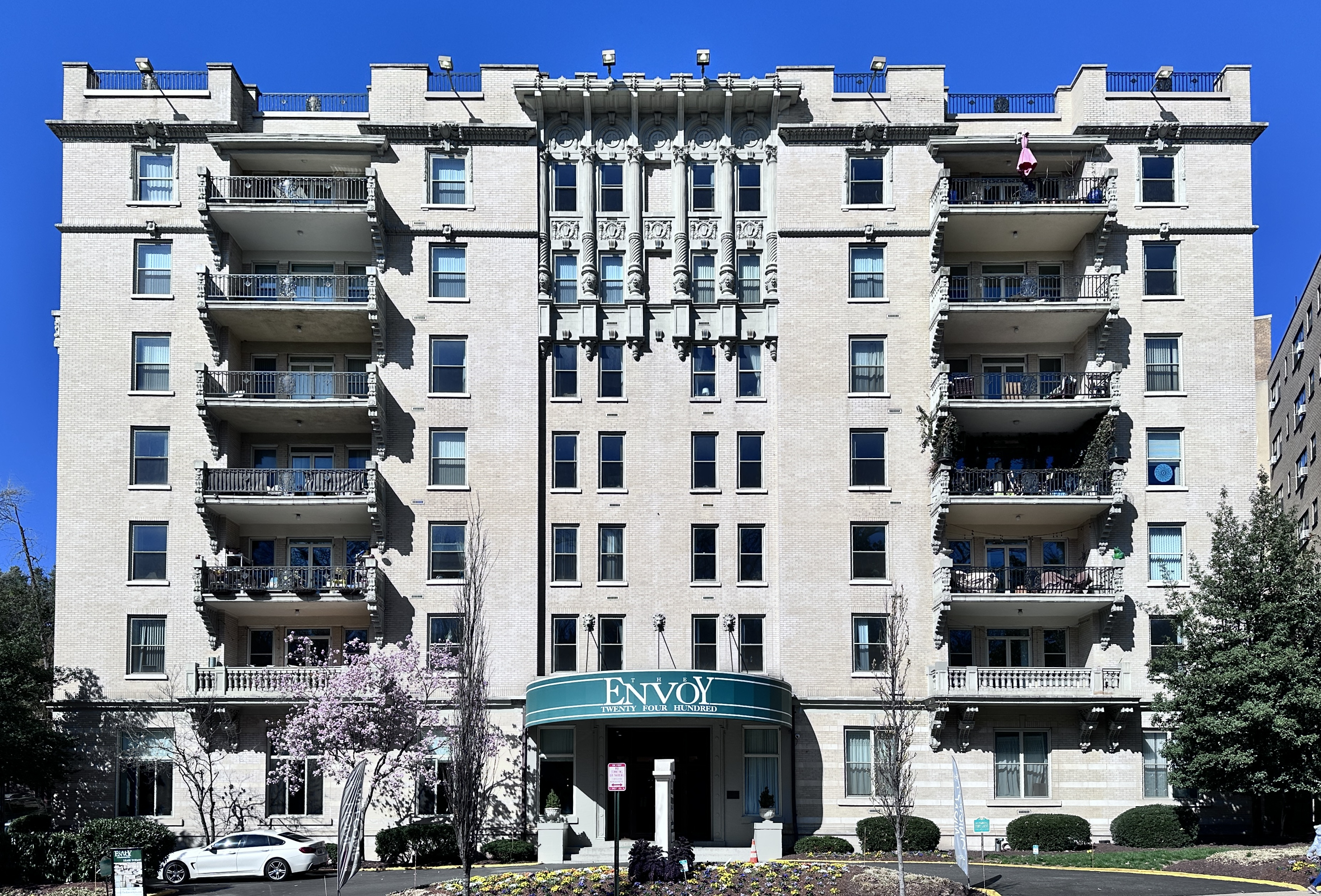
- Meridian Mansions in 2025

- Location within Washington, D.C.
- Location: 2400 16th St. NW; Washington, D.C.
- Coordinates: 38°55′17″N 77°2′13″W
- Built: 1916–1918
- Architect: A.H. Sonnemann
- Architectural style: Italianate
- MPS: Apartment Buildings in Washington, DC, MPS
- NRHP reference No.: 83001417
- Added to NRHP: July 28, 1983

Meridian Mansions, also known as The Envoy, is a historic structure located in the Meridian Hill neighborhood in the Northwest Quadrant of Washington, D.C. A.H. Sonnemann was the architect for what was considered the city's finest apartment hotel when it opened in 1918. The building has been home to members of Congress and diplomats over the years. The lobby contains marble columns and elaborate ornamental molding. At one time the building featured roof pavilions and lamp standards, which were removed around 1963. It was renovated in 1981 and it was listed on the National Register of Historic Places in 1983. The building is most notable due to its connection to the establishment of Czechoslovakia as an independent nation. Tomáš Garrigue Masaryk, the founder and first President of Czechoslovakia, resided here between July and November 1918. The first Czechoslovak national flag to be created was flown from the building on October 18, 1918.
