= Inter-American Defense Board =

International committee

- Junta Interamericana de Defensa (Spanish); Junta Interamericana de Defesa (Portuguese)
- Founded: 1942; 84 years ago
- Type: Intergovernmental organization
- Headquarters: Pink Palace, 2600 16th St., NW
- Location: Washington, D.C.
- Website: Website

The Inter-American Defense Board (IADB) is an international defense institution of the Organization of American States, headquartered in Washington, D.C. The IADB is an international committee of nationally appointed defense officials who develop collaborative approaches on common defense and security issues facing countries in North, Central, and South America.

== History ==
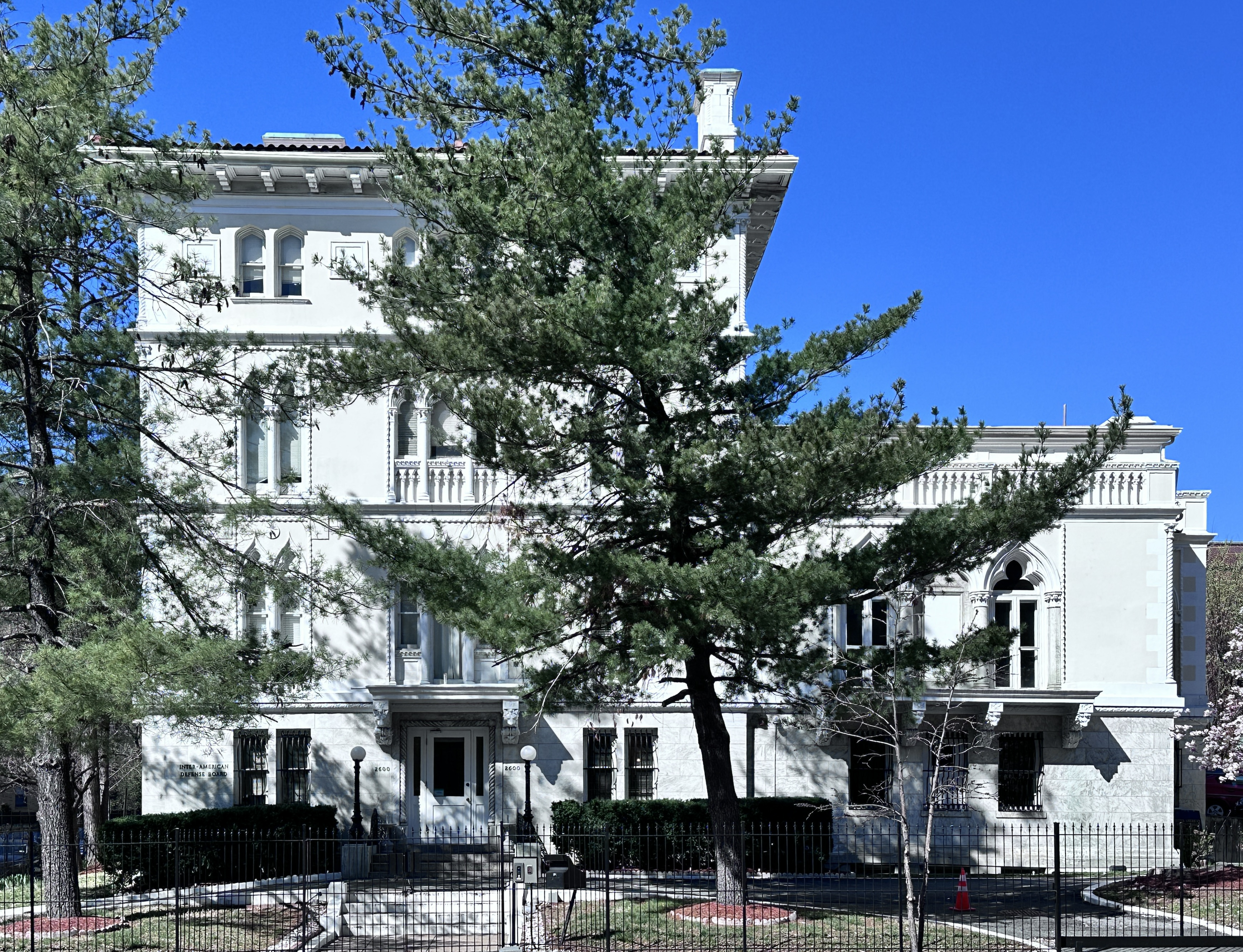
IADB headquarters at the Pink Palace, in the Meridian Hill neighborhood of Washington, D.C.

The IADB was created in 1942 by foreign ministers of 21 states, in the middle of World War II. It is now the oldest existing defense organization in the world.

The Inter-American Defense Board is based at the historic Pink Palace, in the Meridian Hill neighborhood of Washington, D.C.

In March 2006, the OAS assumed formal authority over the IADB. As of that date, 27 of the 34 members of OAS were also members of the IADB.

== Inter-American Defense College ==
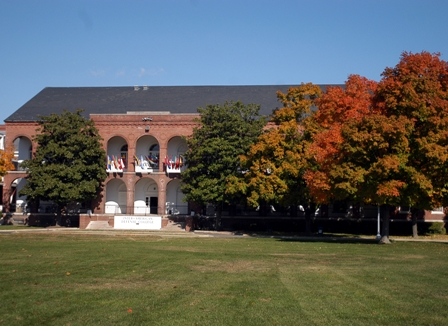
The Inter-American Defense College is based at Fort Lesley J. McNair, in the Buzzard Point neighborhood of Washington, D.C.

The Board is made up of three main organs, one of which is the Inter-American Defense College (IADC). The IADC offers a twelve-month Master's of Science degree for senior military, police, and government officials that covers governmental systems, the current international environment, and the structure and function of the Inter-American system, and offers an opportunity to study broad-based defense and security issues affecting the Western Hemisphere and the world. It is located at Fort Lesley J. McNair in Washington, D.C.

== Inter-American Defense Board Medal ==
The Inter-American Defense Board Medal is an international military decoration. It is awarded to any military officer, serving in a member nation of the OAS, who completes a tour of service with the IADB. The award is also presented to military personnel who serve on the staff of the IADB Chairman or Secretariat, and for those who complete instructor tours at the IADC.
