= Meridian Hall (Washington, D.C.) =

Historic house in Washington, D.C., United States

- Mansion at 2401 15th Street, NW
- U.S. National Register of Historic Places
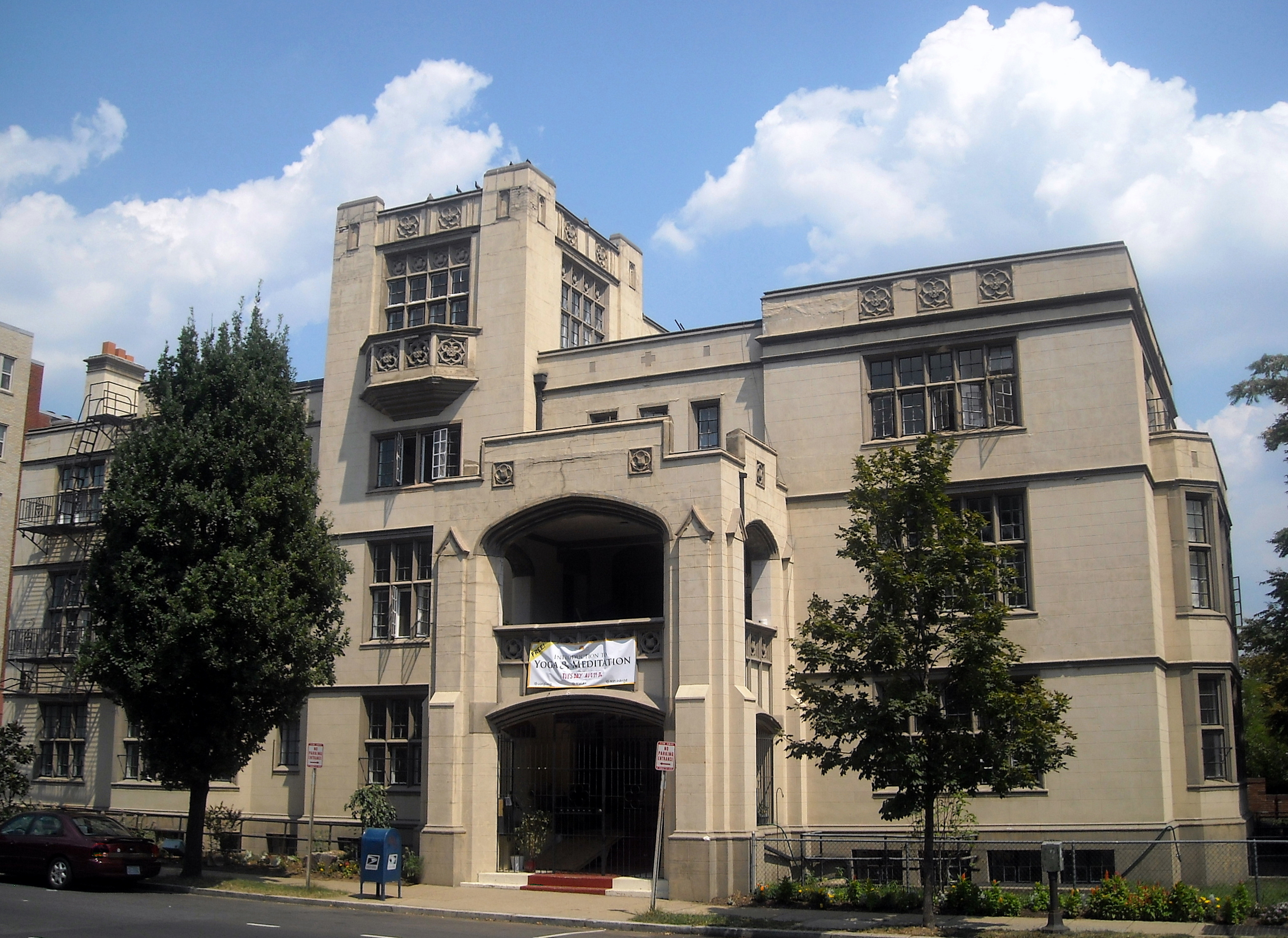

- Location within Washington, D.C.
- Location: 2401 15th St., NW; Washington, D.C.
- Coordinates: 38°55′18″N 77°2′6″W
- Built: 1923; 103 years ago
- Architect: George Oakley Totten Jr.
- Architectural style: Tudor Revival
- NRHP reference No.: 90002147
- Added to NRHP: January 28, 1991

Meridian Hall is an historic house in the Columbia Heights neighborhood of Washington, D.C. It has been listed on the District of Columbia Inventory of Historic Sites since 1990 and it was listed on the National Register of Historic Places in 1991 as the Mansion at 2401 15th Street, NW. Today, it is headquarters of the Art of Living Foundation.

== History ==
The house was commissioned by Mary Foote Henderson who led the movement to make Sixteenth Street NW and the Meridian Hill area of Washington and enclave of mansions and embassies. This structure did serve as an embassy, as it was intended, for a brief period of time, serving the Egyptian government.

== Architecture ==
George Oakley Totten Jr., who was known as Washington's leading Beaux-Arts architect, designed this house in the Tudor Revival style. It was completed in 1923. The exterior features a scored stucco façade which is reminiscent of an English manor house. The front sports a large arched entrance portal and the building has panels of casement windows and cast stone quatrefoil ornamentation. The interior features a large central staircase, salons, ballroom, and a dining hall that is ornamented in the Tudor classical style.
