= List of public art in Washington, D.C., Ward 1 =

This is a list of public art in Ward 1 of Washington, D.C.

This list applies only to works of public art accessible in an outdoor public space. For example, this does not include artwork visible inside a museum.

Most of the works mentioned are sculptures. When this is not the case (i.e. sound installation, for example) it is stated next to the title.

Title	Artist	Year	Location/GPS Coordinates	Material	Dimensions	Owner	Image
The James Cardinal Gibbons Memorial Statue	Leo Lentelli	1932	Shrine of the Sacred Heart 38°55′53″N 77°2′10.31″W	Bronze & granite	Sculpture: approx. H. 7 ft.; Base: approx. H. 8 ft. W. 10 ft. (2,500 lbs.).	Shrine of the Sacred Heart	
Kauffmann Memorial	William Ordway Partridge	1897	Rock Creek Cemetery – Section B	Bronze & granite	Overall: approx. 70 x 163 x 144 in.; Figure: approx. H. 4 ft.; Relief panels: approx. H. 15 in. W. 26 in.	Rock Creek Cemetery	
Guglielmo Marconi	Attilio Piccirilli	1940	16th St. & Lamont St. N.W. 38°55′55″N 77°2′12″W	Bronze & granite	Female figure: approx. 95 x 72 x 36 in.; Base: approx 200 x 182 x 54 in.; Marconi: approx. 40 x 30 x 16 in.; Base: approx. 95 x 32 x 18 in.	United States Department of the Interior	
Perry Lions	Roland Hinton Perry	1906/2002	Taft Bridge 38°55′22.04″N 77°3′4.25″W	Cast Concrete	4 lions. Each lion: approx. 7 ft. x 6 ft. 6 in. x 13 ft.; Each base: approx. 6 ft. 6 in. x 10 ft. x 16 ft.	D.C. Department of Public Works	
Joan of Arc	Paul Dubois	1922	Meridian Hill Park 38°55′14.52″N 77°2′8.57″W	Bronze & granite	Sculpture: approx. H. 6 ft. 10 in. W. 6 ft. 2 in.; Base: approx. H. 52 in. W. 11 ft.	United States Department of the Interior	
Noyes Armillary Sphere	C. Paul Jennewein	1936	Meridian Hill Park 38°55′10.19″N 77°2′8.26″W	Bronze & granite	Sculpture: approx. H. 6 ft. 6 in. W. 5 ft. 5 in.; Base: approx. H. 3 ft. 4 in.	United States Department of the Interior	
James Buchanan Memorial	Hans Schuler	1930	Meridian Hill Park 38.91965°N 77.03498°W	Bronze & granite	Sculpture: approx. H. 6 ft. 2 in. W. 6 ft. 7 in.;	United States Department of the Interior	
Cascading Waterfall	John Joseph Earley & George Burnap	1936	Meridian Hill Park 38°55′11.44″N 77°2′8.38″W	Concrete	Fountain: approx. w. 300 ft.	United States Department of the Interior	
The Parable	Jimilu Mason	1990	Festival Center, 1640 Columbia Rd., N.W. 38°55′31.46″N 77°2′17.11″W	Bronze	Sculpture: approx. H. 60 in. (500 lbs.).	Festival Center	
Two Men Reading	Unknown		Howard University, 601 Fairmont St., N.W.	Stone		Howard University	
A Bridge Across and Beyond	Richard Hunt	1978	Howard University, Blackburn Center	Steel		Howard University	
Symbiosis	Richard Hunt		Howard University, 2400 6th St, N.W.	Corten Steel	H. 9 ft x W. 4 ft.	Howard University	
Students Aspire	Elizabeth Catlett	1977	Howard University, 2300 6th St, N.W., building facade	Bronze	Approx. h. 14 ft. w. 4 ft. 6 in.	Howard University	
Family Circle	Herbert House	1991	18th & Harvard St., N.W. 38°55′37.33″N 77°2′28.88″W	Steel	Sculpture: approx. 5 x 3 x 2 ft.; Base: approx. H. 36 in. Diam. 84 in.	DC Art/works?	
Francis Asbury	Augustus Lukeman	1921	16th St & Mt. Pleasant St., N.W. 38°55′39″N 77°2′12″W	Bronze	Sculpture: approx. 100 x 60 x 132 in.; Base: approx. 100 x 140 x 200 ft.	United States Department of the Interior	
The Servant Christ	Jimilu Mason	1986	Christ House, 1717 Columbia Rd. 38°55′34″N 77°1′55″W	Bronze	Sculpture: approx. H. 4 ft. 3 in. D. 2 ft.	Christ House	
Fortitude	James King	1979	Howard University – Science Valley 38°55′19″N 77°1′11″W	Metal		Howard University	
Bairstow Eagle Lampposts	Ernest C. Bairstow	1906	Taft Bridge 38°55′32″N 77°3′07″W	Painted iron	24 lampposts. Each lamppost: approx. H. 17 ft. W. 4 ft. Diam: 20 in.; Each base: approx. H. 5 ft. 8 in. W. 4 ft.	District of Columbia	
Serenity	Josep Clarà	1925	Meridian Hill Park 38°55′19″N 77°2′10″W	Carrara Marble	Sculpture: approx. H. 79 in. W. 5 ft. 4 in.; Base: approx. H. 22 in. W. 99 in.	United States Department of the Interior	
Dante Alighieri	Ettore Ximenes	1921	Meridian Hill Park	Bronze	Sculpture: approx. 8 ft. 7 in. x 3 ft. 8 in.; Base: approx. 6 ft. 7 in. x 4 ft. 10 in.	United States Department of the Interior	
New Leaf	Lisa Scheer	2007	Georgia Avenue – Petworth Metro Station 38°56′12.58″N 77°1′27.15″W	Bronze	8 x 45 x 2.5	Washington Metro	
Woven Identities	Meghan Walsh & Casa Del Pueblo Youth	1999	Columbia Heights Metro Station – West Entrance			Washington Metro	
Carry the Rainbow on Your Shoulders	Jerome Meadows	1997	Unity Park – Columbia Rd., Euclid St. and Champlain St., N.W.				
This is How We Live	Garin Baker	2008	239 Elm Street, N.W.	Paint		DC Commission on the Arts and Humanities	
(Here I Stand) In The Spirit of Paul Robeson	Allen Uzikee Nelson	2001	Georgia & Kansas Aves. N.W.				
Spirit of Freedom	Ed Hamilton	1988	Vermont Ave. & U St. N.W.	Bronze			
Emiliano Zapata			Mexican Cultural Institute	Bronze			
The Mama Ayesha's Restaurant Presidential Mural	Karla Cecilia Rodas Cortez (Karlisima)	2009	1967 Calvert Street Northwest	Paint	Mural 60' x 24'	Mama Ayesha's	
