= Noyes Armillary Sphere =

Sculpture in Washington, D.C.

Coordinates: 38.919499°N 77.035628°W

- Noyes Armillary Sphere in 2024
- Interactive map of Noyes Armillary Sphere
- Location: Meridian Hill Park; Washington, D.C.
- Designer: C. Paul Jennewein (sculpture); Horace Peaslee (pedestal)
- Material: Bronze, Granite
- Width: 5 ft 5 in (1.65 m)
- Height: 6 ft 6 in (1.98 m)
- Beginning date: 1930
- Dedicated date: November 10, 1936
- Restored date: 2024
- Dedicated to: Edith Noyes

The Noyes Armillary Sphere is a bronze armillary sphere located in Meridian Hill Park, a 12-acre (4.9 ha) urban park in Washington, D.C. It was the fifth artwork installed in the park and was designed by sculptor C. Paul Jennewein, whose other works in the city include the Darlington Memorial Fountain and 57 sculptural elements at the Robert F. Kennedy Department of Justice Building. Artist Bertha Noyes donated $15,000 toward the project's cost in honor of her deceased sister, Edith. The sphere is sited in the park's exedra, south of the Cascading Waterfall and reflecting pool. It rests on a granite pedestal designed by Horace Peaslee, an architect who oversaw construction of Meridian Hill Park.

Jennewein completed his design of the sculpture in 1931 and a bill accepting it on behalf of the United States was signed into law by President Herbert Hoover the following year. After the sphere was founded by the Roman Bronze Works company, it remained in New York because of delays in installing the foundation. The sphere was finally dedicated in 1936. During the next few decades, the sphere and some of the park's other sculptures were damaged. In 1973, the sphere was removed by the National Park Service (NPS) and placed in a storage facility, where it was either stolen or misplaced. In 2018, the NPS announced an exact replica would be installed in the park. Using old drawings and photographs, Kreilick Conservation LLC created the new sphere which was installed in 2024.

== History ==
=== Planning ===
Meridian Hill Park is a 12-acre (4.9 ha) urban park in Washington, D.C., located between 15th, 16th, Euclid, and W Streets NW. It was built between 1914 and 1936 as part of the City Beautiful movement and at the behest of Mary Foote Henderson, an activist and real estate developer whose mansion overlooked the park. The park was originally planned by landscape architect George Burnap, but after he left the project, architect Horace Peaslee oversaw its completion. Plans for the park included spaces for public art installations. During the 1920s, the Dante Alighieri, Joan of Arc, and Serenity statues were dedicated. A fourth installation, a memorial to President James Buchanan, was dedicated in 1930.

Plans for a fifth art installation in the park was headed by Charles Moore, a city planner who served as chairman of the United States Commission of Fine Arts (CFA) from 1915 to 1937. Inspired by Paul Manship's Cochran Armillary located on the campus of Phillips Academy in Massachusetts, CFA member and landscape architect Ferruccio Vitale suggested an armillary sphere be installed on the southern end of the park, below the Cascading Waterfall and reflecting pool. Chinese astronomers invented armillary spheres around 200 BC. The spheres map celestial objects by using rings to represent principal circles of the heavens.

After Moore was informed of the estimated $30,000 cost of Manship's design, the commission was given to sculptor C. Paul Jennewein, whose design was based on the one by Manship. Examples of Jennewein's works in Washington, D.C., are the Darlington Memorial Fountain in Judiciary Square, 57 sculptural elements at the Robert F. Kennedy Department of Justice Building, and two statues at the Rayburn House Office Building. Peaslee was selected to design the sphere's pedestal. Artist Bertha Noyes paid $15,000 of the project cost in memory of her sister, Edith Noyes, who was an invalid and had died in 1925.

=== Production and installation ===
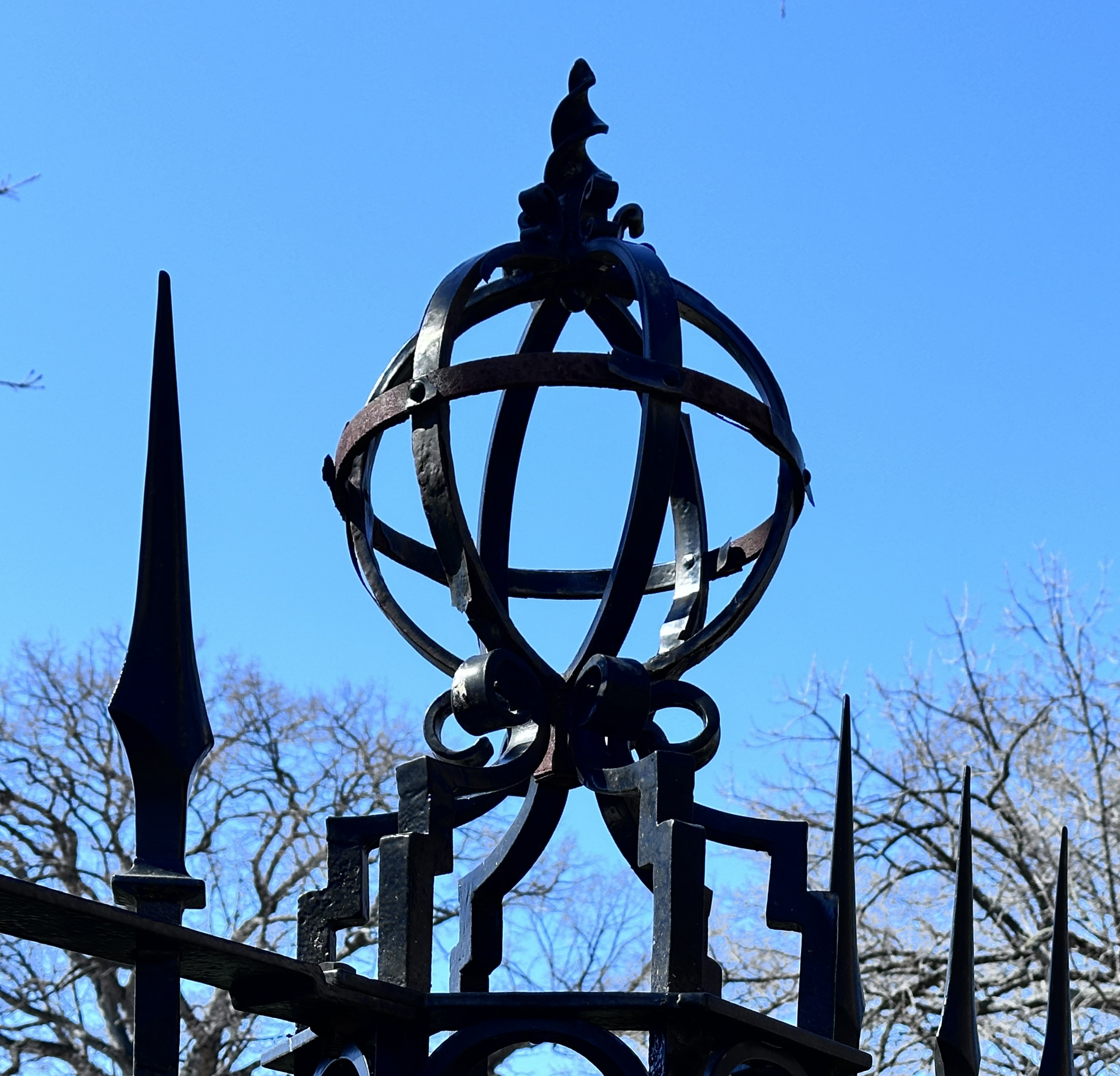
Armillary spheres were added to a fence in north end of the park.

By 1931, Jennewein had completed sculpting the sphere. Due to a limited budget, Jennewein's suggestion that the bronze sculpture be fire gilded and "burnished to a bright color" did not occur. Following its passage in the United States House of Representatives, a resolution to accept the sculpture on behalf of the country was passed by the United States Senate Committee on Public Buildings and Grounds on May 12, 1932. After Congress passed the final bill on June 10, 1932, to accept the sculpture and approve its location, President Herbert Hoover signed the bill into law. In December 1933, CFA members traveled to Brooklyn to assess the sculpture's progress at the Roman Bronze Works company. The founding process had taken 14 months and cost $2,800. Although the sphere was ready to be transported to Washington, D.C., there were delays in installing the foundation at the park and the sphere remained in New York.

It wasn't until spring 1935 that the foundation was installed, followed by the sphere a few months later. The total cost of the project was $31,199. Work continued on the sphere through the following year. After the inscription "Given to the Federal City, MCMXXXVI, for Edith Noyes" was engraved, the sphere was dedicated (Note: Some sources give the date of November 10, 1936, but a few (Goode, National Park Service, Smithsonian) lists 1931, 1932, and 1934, which contradicts news articles from the 1930s.) on November 10, 1936. A bronze calibration plaque, located on a cast iron post by the sphere, was later installed to correct errors with time precision. Decorative armillary spheres were added on top of the wrought-iron fence located on the north end of the park.

=== Removal and replacement ===
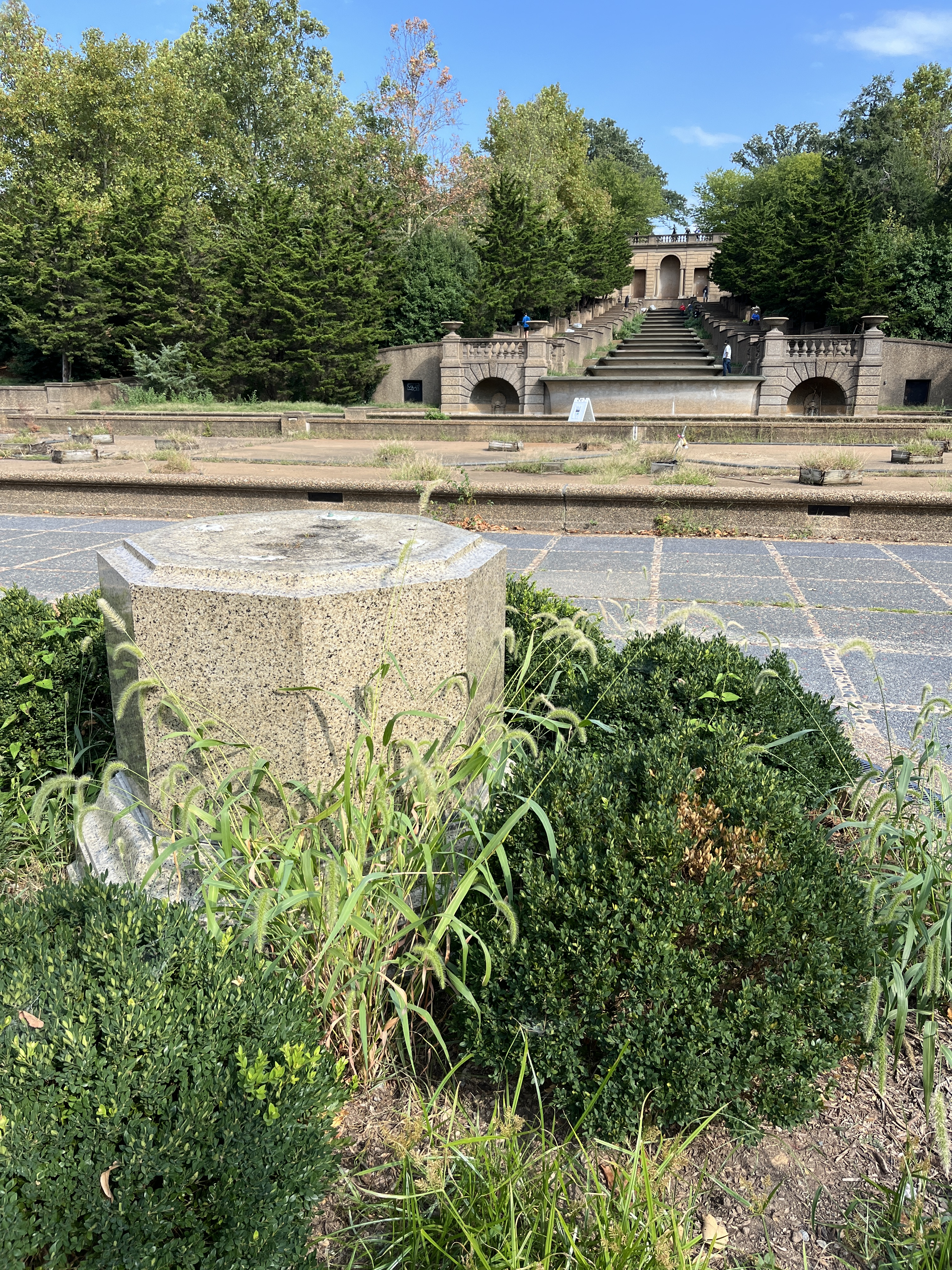
The pedestal in 2024 before the sphere was replaced

The sphere and some of the other artworks in the park were sometimes vandalized. The sword on the Joan of Arc statue was stolen, pieces of the Serenity statue were removed by hammers, and the sphere was used as a jungle gym by children. In addition to the damage children did to the sphere, it was possibly vandalized during the 1968 Washington, D.C., riots. In 1973, the sphere was removed by the National Park Service (NPS), which has administered Meridian Hill Park since 1933. The NPS placed the sphere in storage to prevent further damage. Plans were made to repair the sphere, but at some point, it was either stolen or misplaced. The sphere's putto sculpture and the calibration plaque had also been removed, but were accounted for at a storage facility in Landover, Maryland. The only remaining piece left in the park was the pedestal, which was hidden behind overgrown hedges. The putto, calibration plaque, and pedestal were designated contributing properties to Meridian Hill Park's listing as a National Historic Landmark.

In 1985, the Historic American Buildings Survey program released a report on Meridian Hill Park, which included details of the missing sphere. This brought attention to its fate, and a few years later, a NPS employee suggested a facsimile be made. The estimated cost of this replica was between $48,000 and $90,000, but due to a lack of funding, the plan did not come to fruition at that time. In the 1990s, NPS official John Parsons offered support for a replica "on its original base to the exact historic scale, design, and specifications".

It wasn't until 2004 that a full-scale aluminum mock-up costing $8,840 was made. It too was placed in a Maryland storage facility because the aluminum would have been unsuitable for inclement weather. The NPS announced in 2018 that restorations would be made to Meridian Hill Park beginning the following year. One of these improvements would be a replica of the sphere being installed thanks to a donation by Roger and Susan Gendron. Based on original drawings and photographs of the sphere, Kreilick Conservation LLC used techniques including computer numerical control and 3D modeling to create a replica. The new sphere was installed in November 2024.

== Location and design ==
The sphere is located in the park's exedra, south of the Cascading Waterfall and reflecting pool. It stands on the Washington meridian that passes through the White House. A wrought iron fence and bushes surround the sphere. It rests on an octagonal green granite pedestal which is 3 ft 4 in (1.02 m) tall and features heavy molding. The sphere measures 6 ft 6 in (1.98 m) tall, 5 ft 5 in (1.65 m) wide, and 17 ft 9 in (5.41 m) in circumference. It weighs (Note: Sources differ on the weight.) between 1,250 pounds (570 kg) and 1,500 pounds (680 kg).

The sculpture's pedestal features a bronze putto called "Child Greeting the Sun". The winged figure, which is around 18 in (0.46 m) tall and faces south, represents the "birth of each new day". The bronze sphere resembles a celestial globe and is composed of rings inscribed with reliefs. The two largest rings represent the Meridian and Equator. The equatorial ring features reliefs of astrological signs on the exterior. On the interior are stars representing nighttime hours and Roman numerals representing hours of the day. A third ring represents the ecliptic plane and intersects with the larger rings. There is a small ring on both the north and south sides of the sphere, representing the North and South Poles. A gnomon arrow that is facing north represents the Earth's axis and casts a shadow on the equatorial ring, allowing visitors to know the local time.

== See also ==
- List of public art in Washington, D.C., Ward 1
- Outdoor sculpture in Washington, D.C.
