= Statue of Dante Alighieri (Meridian Hill Park) =

Statue by Ettore Ximenes in Washington, D.C., U.S.

Dante Alighieri
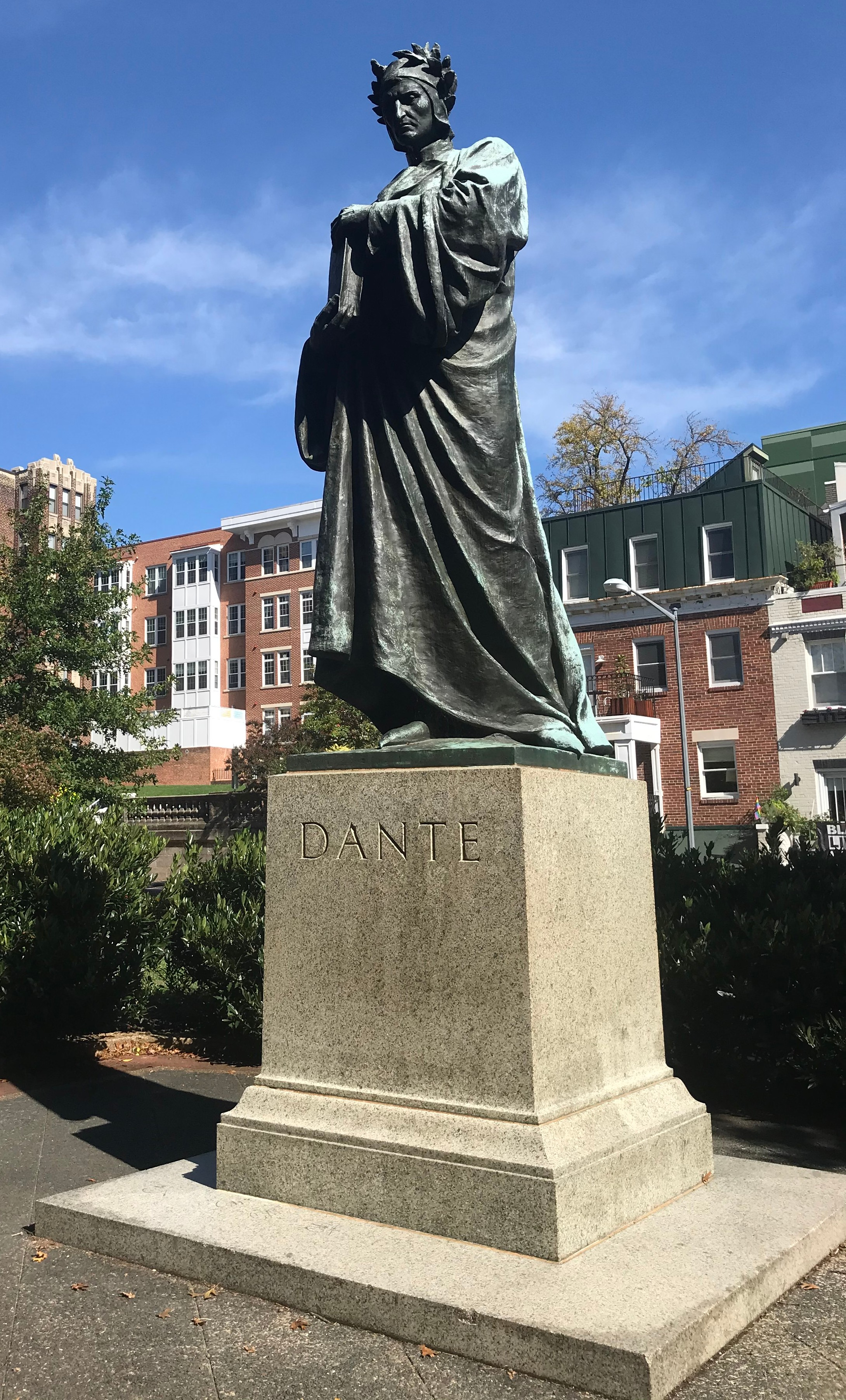
- The statue in 2020
- Artist: Ettore Ximenes (sculptor); Whitney Warren (base); Horace Peaslee (architect); Roman Bronze Works (founder)
- Year: 1921
- Type: Bronze (sculpture); Granite (base)
- Dimensions: 2.61 m × 1.12 m (8.6 ft × 3.7 ft)
- Location: Meridian Hill Park Washington, D.C.; 38°55′12.8″N 77°2′5.9″W
- Owner: National Park Service

Dante Alighieri is a public artwork by Italian sculptor Ettore Ximenes, located at Meridian Hill Park in Washington, D.C., United States. The bronze statue on a granite base depicts Dante Alighieri, an Italian poet and philosopher who is considered one of the greatest literary figures of the Late Middle Ages. The idea for a statue honoring Dante was spearheaded by Italian American businessman and newspaper publisher Carlo Barsotti. The original is located in Dante Park in Manhattan with the replica in Meridian Hill Park. The dedication ceremony in Washington, D.C., was attended by officials from Italy, France, and the United States, including President Warren G. Harding. The statue is one of three public artworks in the city depicting Dante.

== History ==
=== Biography ===
Dante Alighieri (1265–1321) was an Italian poet, writer, diplomat, and philosopher and is considered to be one of the greatest literary figures of the Late Middle Ages. He is one of Italy's national poets and the "father" of the Italian language, and his work Divina Commedia (Divine Comedy) is one of the greatest pieces of Italian literature. His other major works include La Vita Nuova (The New Life) and Monarchia (Monarchy). Born to businessman Alighiero di Bellincione and his wife, Bella, Dante became interested in poetry at an early age. He was influenced by the Sicilian School but developed his own style of writing, using vernacular language more accessible to a wider audience. He fought in various battles during the Guelphs and Ghibellines conflict. He later served as a politician and the Florentine ambassador to Pope Boniface VIII. After a new government took control of the Florentine republic, Dante was exiled by Cante dei Gabrielli and never returned to his hometown. He spent the rest of his life traveling throughout Italy and France, writing numerous works.

=== Memorial planning ===
Carlo Barsotti, an Italian American businessman and newspaper publisher who founded Il Progresso Italo-Americano, wanted to donate an artwork to the United States on behalf of the Italian American community. Barsotti said he had a "desire to show in tangible form our love, devotion and loyalty to this great nation." There were already plans in Europe and the United States to memorialize the 600th anniversary of Dante's death. Italian sculptor Ettore Ximenes, whose dozens of works were found throughout Europe and South America, was selected to design the statue of Dante. When Italian poet and scholar Giovanni Pascoli saw Ximenes' model of the statue, Pascoli said it was the best representation of Dante he had ever seen. He wrote an anthem praising the design with music provided by Italian opera composer Ruggero Leoncavallo. The statue is somewhat similar to the Dante monument which stands in front of the Basilica of the Holy Cross in Florence.

=== Dedication ===
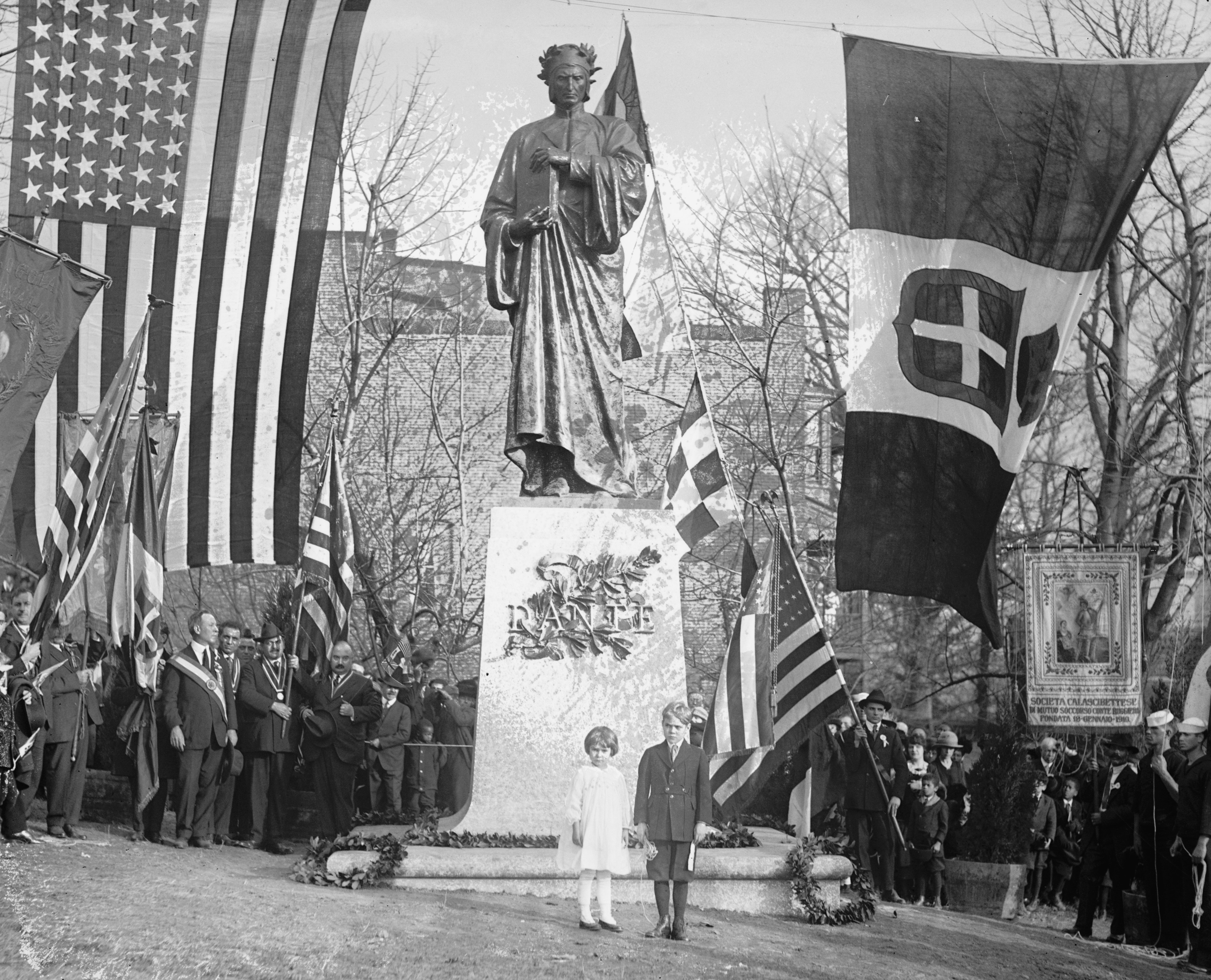
Dedication ceremony in 1921

In 1921, Ximenes' original statue was dedicated in Dante Park, a small public park located across the street from the Lincoln Center in Manhattan. When asked about the caliber of his statue, Ximenes told art critic Florence Brooks: "That is not for me or you to say but for the public, for posterity. Every work performed by an artist is a page in history." Barsotti commissioned a replica to be installed in Washington, D.C., at a cost of $20,000. It was founded by the Roman Bronze Works company and the site was designed by Horace Peaslee. The dedication ceremony in Meridian Hill Park was hastily planned to coincide with a conference on disarmament attended by Italian government officials, and a temporary wooden pedestal for the statue was installed. The ceremony took place on December 1, 1921, a few weeks before the nearby equestrian statue of Joan of Arc was dedicated.

French and Italian officials attended the ceremony in what was described as an "international love feast". Hundreds of Italian Americans from societies in East Coast cities gathered at 11th and I Streets NW and marched in a parade to the dedication site while band music was played. The guests of honor at the ceremony were President Warren G. Harding and First Lady Florence Harding. Others in attendance included French Ambassador Jean Jules Jusserand, American Judge John J. Freschi, Italian politicians Carlo Schanzer, Riccardo Moizo, and Francesco Quattrone, and Italian diplomats Marquis D. Bernezzo and Pietro Civalleri.

The opening prayer was given by Alfred Harding, the bishop of Washington. Speeches were given by Barsotti, Italian Ambassador Vittorio Rolandi Ricci, former French Prime Minister René Viviani, and president of the Board of Commissioners Cuno Hugo Rudolph. The statue was draped with American and Italian flags. It was unveiled by Clarence Caldwell and Minnie Elizabeth Sherrill, the children of Harding's military aide and director of the Office of Public Buildings and Grounds, Clarence O. Sherrill. The benediction was given by Cornelius Thomas, the rector of St. Patrick's Catholic Church. Italian diplomats joined French officials at the Joan of Arc statue dedication the following month.

=== Later history ===
The United States Congress did not issue a resolution accepting the statue until February 14, 1922, and a permit from the United States Army Corps of Engineers was not issued until May 21, 1924. A plan to move the statue in 1923 to the intersection of 16th and Mt. Pleasant Street NW was abandoned when it was determined the Francis Asbury Memorial would be erected on that site. The statue's permanent base, designed by Whitney Warren, was installed in April 1924. The statue is owned and maintained by the National Park Service, an agency of the United States Department of the Interior, which oversees maintenance of all federal parks in the city. It is one of three public artworks in Washington, D.C., featuring Dante. The others are Eminent Men of Letters, a collection of nine granite busts on the Thomas Jefferson Building exterior, and a marble statue in front of the Casa Italiana Language School.

== Location and description ==
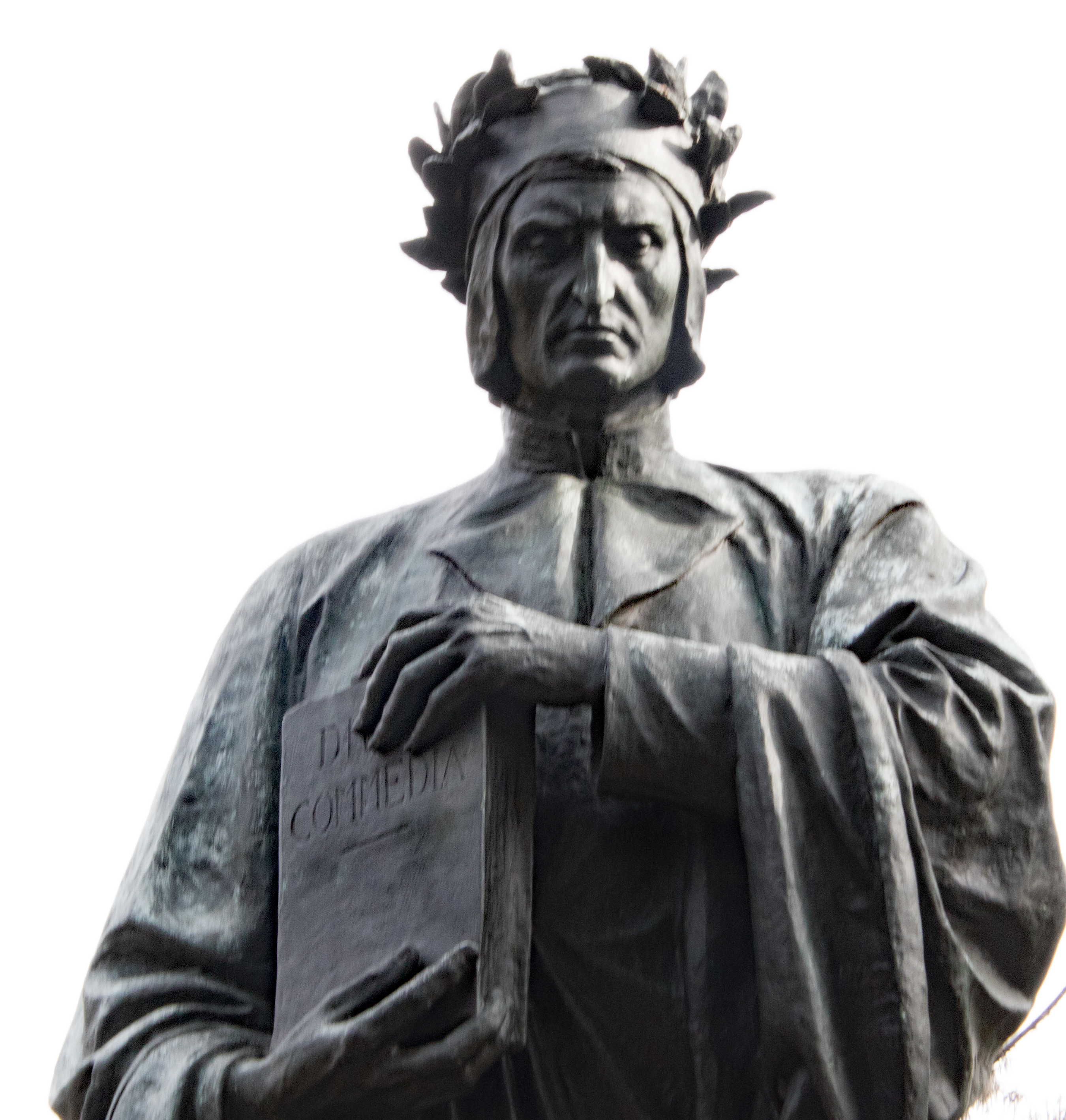
Detail of the statue in 2017

The artwork is located in Meridian Hill Park in Washington, D.C., east of the Cascading Waterfall, in an area nicknamed the Poet's Corner. There is a sidewalk leading up to it and benches on either side. It is one of several artworks in the park, including the Serenity statue, the Joan of Arc statue, the James Buchanan Memorial, and the Noyes Armillary Sphere.

The bronze statue depicts Dante Alighieri standing, wearing a robe and pointed shoes, with a laurel wreath upon his head. At his proper right side he holds a copy of Divine Comedy in his hands. He appears deep in thought and preparing to take a step. The statue, weighing 3,000 pounds (1,400 kg), measures 8 feet 7 inches (2.62 m) tall and 3 feet 8 inches (1.12 m) wide. It rests on a granite base measuring 6 feet 7 inches (2.01 m) tall and 4 feet 10 inches (1.47 m) wide. The proper right side of the bronze is signed by Ximenes and the rear of the figure is stamped with the founders mark "Roman Bronze Works N.Y."

The front of the base features the inscription: DANTE

And on the back of the base is inscribed:

DANTE ALIGHIERI
PRESENTED TO THE
CITY OF WASHINGTON
IN BEHALF OF THE
ITALIANS IN THE
UNITED STATES BY
COMM CARLO BARSOTTI

== See also ==
- List of public art in Washington, D.C., Ward 1
