= Equestrian statue of Joan of Arc (Washington, D.C.) =

Statue by Paul Dubois in Washington, D.C., U.S.

Joan of Arc
- Jeanne D'Arc (French)
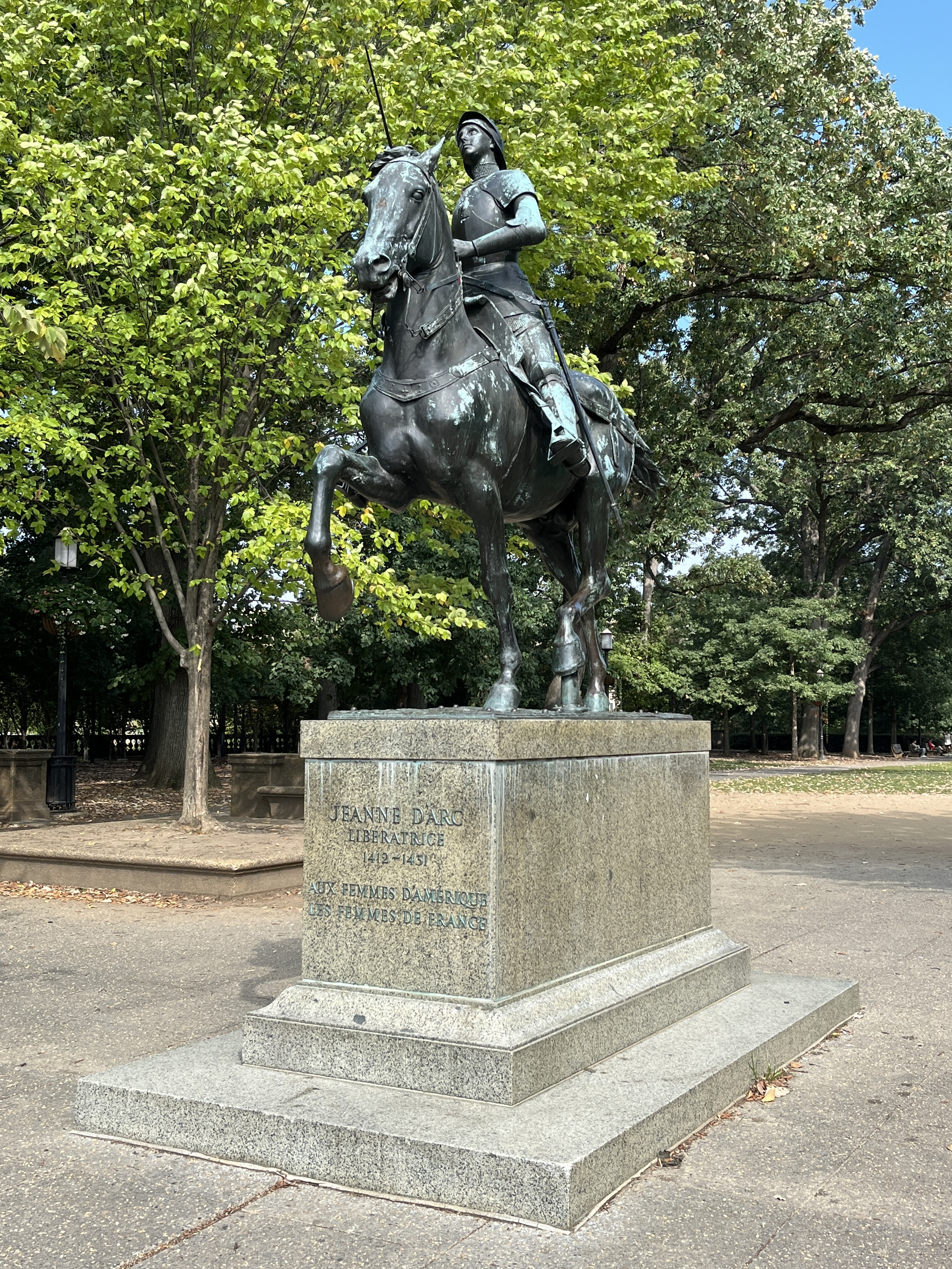
- Statue in 2024
- Artist: Paul Dubois
- Year: 1922
- Type: Bronze (statue); Granite (base)
- Dimensions: 2.08 m × 1.83 m (82 in × 72 in)
- Location: Meridian Hill Park, Washington, D.C., U.S.; 38°55′15″N 77°02′09″W
- Owner: National Park Service

Joan of Arc is a 1922 cast of the 1896 statue sculpted by French artist Paul Dubois. It is located in the center of the grand terrace at Meridian Hill Park, an urban park in Washington, D.C., United States. The bronze statue rests on a granite base designed by McKim, Mead & White. It depicts French heroine, patron saint, and national symbol Joan of Arc riding into battle, wielding a sword as she looks towards the sky. It is the only equestrian statue in Washington, D.C. that depicts a woman. It is one of several public artworks in the park. The statue is owned and maintained by the National Park Service, an agency of the United States Department of the Interior.

The statue was a gift of the Society of Women of France of New York (Société des Femmes de France de New York). The dedication ceremony took place on January 6, 1922, with President Warren G. Harding and First Lady Florence Harding in attendance. Speeches were given by French Ambassador Jean Jules Jusserand and Secretary of War John W. Weeks. A 17-gun salute fired from Fort Myer was the first time the United States military had fired such a salute in honor of a woman. Since its installation, Joan of Arc has been repeatedly vandalized. The sword has been stolen and replaced many times since the 1930s. The most recent restoration and sword replacement took place in 2018.

== Description ==
Joan of Arc is an equestrian statue, with Joan of Arc riding a trotting horse, appearing to lead troops into battle. Her body is slightly twisted, and she holds a sword in her right hand. Her right arm is raised behind her and her left hand is holding the horse's reins. The horse's front right foot and left back foot are in the air. She is wearing a helmet with a raised visor, and she looks skywards. The bronze statue is 6 feet 10 inches (2.08 m) tall and 6 feet 2 inches (1.88 m) wide. It rests on a three-tiered, sea green granite base measuring 4 feet 4 inches (1.32 m) tall and 11 feet (3.4 m) wide. Due to exposure to the elements, the statue has a green patina.

The front of the base bears the inscription:

JEANNE D'ARC
LIBERATRICE
1412–1431
AUX FEMMES D'AMERIQUE
LES FEMMES DE FRANCE

Translation:

JOAN OF ARC
LIBERATOR
1412–1431
TO THE WOMEN OF AMERICA
THE WOMEN OF FRANCE

The back of the base bears the inscription:

OFFERT PAR
"LE LYCEUM"
SOCIÉTÉ DES FEMMES DE FRANCE
À NEW YORK
LE 6 JANVIER 1922

Translation:

PRESENTED BY
"LE LYCEUM"
SOCIETY OF FRENCH WOMEN
IN NEW YORK
JANUARY 6, 1922

Joan of Arc is located on a prominent site in Meridian Hill Park, an urban park in Washington, D.C. It stands in the center of the park's grand terrace, just north of the Cascading Waterfall. The statue is owned and maintained by the National Park Service, an agency of the United States Department of the Interior. It is one of several artworks in the park, including the Serenity statue, the Dante Alighieri statue, the James Buchanan Memorial, and the Noyes Armillary Sphere. The Joan of Arc cast in Washington, D.C. is the only equestrian statue in the city depicting a woman.

== History ==
=== Background ===
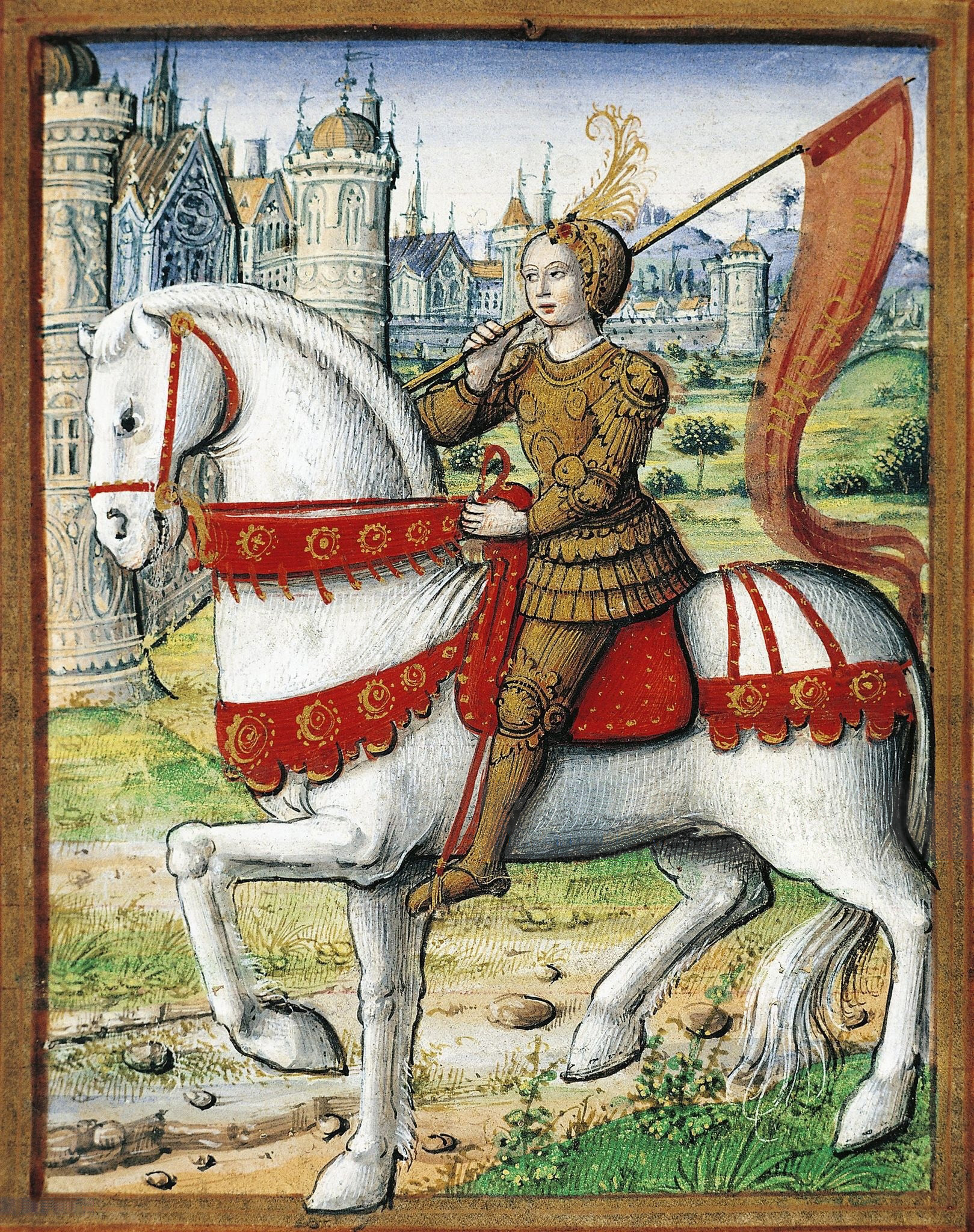
Joan of Arc depicted in 1506 by artist Jean Pichore in the manuscript The Lives of Famous Women.

Joan of Arc (1412 – 30 May 1431) is a French heroine and patron saint who claimed to be acting under divine guidance when she decided to fight for France. She successfully led troops during the siege of Orléans, leading to the coronation of Charles VII during the Hundred Years' War. After the unsuccessful siege of Paris and siege of La Charité, she was captured by Burgundian troops and later sold for ransom. French clergy, who were jealous of Joan's influence over the king, put her on trial for heresy. She was found guilty and burned at the stake around the age of nineteen. Decades later, her rehabilitation trial found the previous trial was corrupt and her conviction was overturned. She became a national symbol of France beginning in the 1800s and was canonized by Pope Benedict XV in 1920.

=== Planning ===
In 1889, the plaster of an equestrian statue sculpted by French artist Paul Dubois was presented at the Paris Salon, and the completed work was installed in front of the Reims Cathedral in 1896. Casts were made and installed in front of the Church of St. Augustine (Église Saint-Augustin) in Paris and St Maurice's Church (Église Saint-Maurice) in Strasbourg. A cast of the statue in Washington, D.C., was first proposed to the United States Commission of Fine Arts (CFA) in May 1916 by Carlo Polifeme, president of the Society of Women of France of New York (Société des Femmes de France de New York). In her letter to the CFA, Polifme wrote:

Le Lyceum, Société des Femmes de France de New York, in a spirit of Patriotism, nurtured by exile, inspired with a deep sense of the friendship that binds our two sister Republics, animated by a sympathy born of closer and closer relations, Le Lyceum intends to perpetuate these sentiments by erecting in their new home a monument to Jeanne D'Arc, emblem of patriotism, emblem of Love and Peace. The statue of our French heroine will be built to the glory of womanhood, dedicated by the women of France in New York, to the women of America, and offered to the city of Washington.

After lobbying efforts by French American groups, Senator Frank B. Brandegee introduced a resolution in 1920 to install a Joan of Arc statue in Washington, D.C. A site in Meridian Hill Park was chosen by the CFA the following year. Production of the bronze cast, founded by Rudier Foundry, was overseen by the French Minister of Fine Arts. The granite pedestal was designed by McKim, Mead & White. The pedestal was carved by either (Note: H. L. Davis is listed as the carver in a 1922 American Art News article. The Rockport Granite Company is listed as the carver by the Smithsonian Institution and a 1922 article in The Monumental News.) the Rockport Granite Company or H. L. Davis of the Harrison Granite Company and A. Le Poidevin & Co., Inc., served as the contractor. The production and installation costs were paid for by the Society of Women of France of New York. The installation in Meridian Hill park was overseen by Clarence O. Sherrill, director of the Office of Public Buildings and Grounds. Stones and dirt from France and a copper box were placed in the foundation.

=== Dedication ===
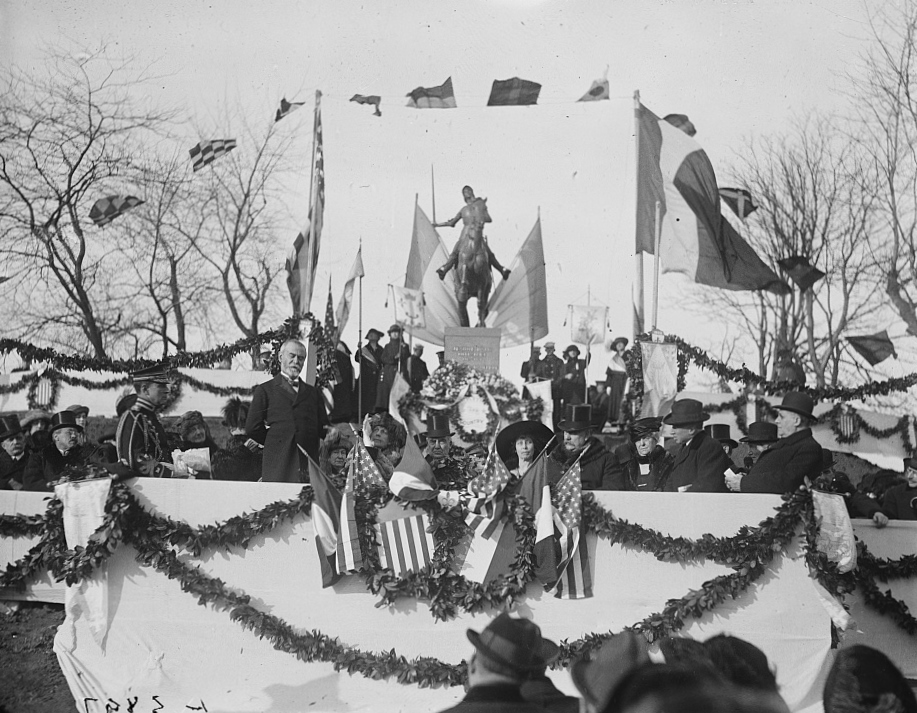
Dedication ceremony in 1922

On January 6, 1922, Joan of Arc was dedicated in Meridian Hill Park, a few weeks after the nearby Dante Alighieri statue was installed. Prior to the ceremony, French Ambassador Jean Jules Jusserand and his wife entertained some of the attendees at the French embassy located across the street from the park. While in the city, members of the Society of Women of France of New York laid wreaths at the Major General Marquis Gilbert de Lafayette statue and the tomb of President George Washington at Mount Vernon. The ceremony's temporary stand was adorned with French and American flags and other decorations. American soldiers and sailors carried Cross of Lorraine and Joan of Arc banners, and the United States Marine Band played La Marseillaise and The Star-Spangled Banner.

Among those in attendance at the dedication ceremony were President Warren G. Harding and First Lady Florence Harding. The introduction was given by Sherrill followed by Polifeme's presentation of the statue to the American people. When the statue, adorned with flags, was unveiled by the first lady and Jusserand's wife, Elisa, a 17-gun salute was fired from Fort Myer. It was the first time the U.S. military had fired such a salute in honor of a woman. Elisa told the audience: "For liberty and peace Lafayette brought you his sword; for peace and justice Jeanne D'Arc brings you the inspiration of her undaunted courage and love of country."

The statue was accepted on behalf of the United States by Secretary of War John W. Weeks. In his speech, Weeks said "That a young woman, hardly of age, and certainly without experience, which would have warranted her being placed in a position of unusual responsibility, could inspire her countrymen to deeds of valor and sacrifice, and ultimately lead them to victory and liberty, is without parallel in the history of the world." The statue was accepted on behalf of American women by Anne Rogers Minor, president of the Daughters of the American Revolution. Ambassador Jusserand then gave a speech thanking the U.S. for erecting a memorial to a French heroine and read a message from President Alexandre Millerand. The benediction was given by Charles Wood, pastor of the Church of the Covenant. On March 20, 1922, an Act of Congress (42 Stat. 468) approved the statue's placement.

=== Later history ===
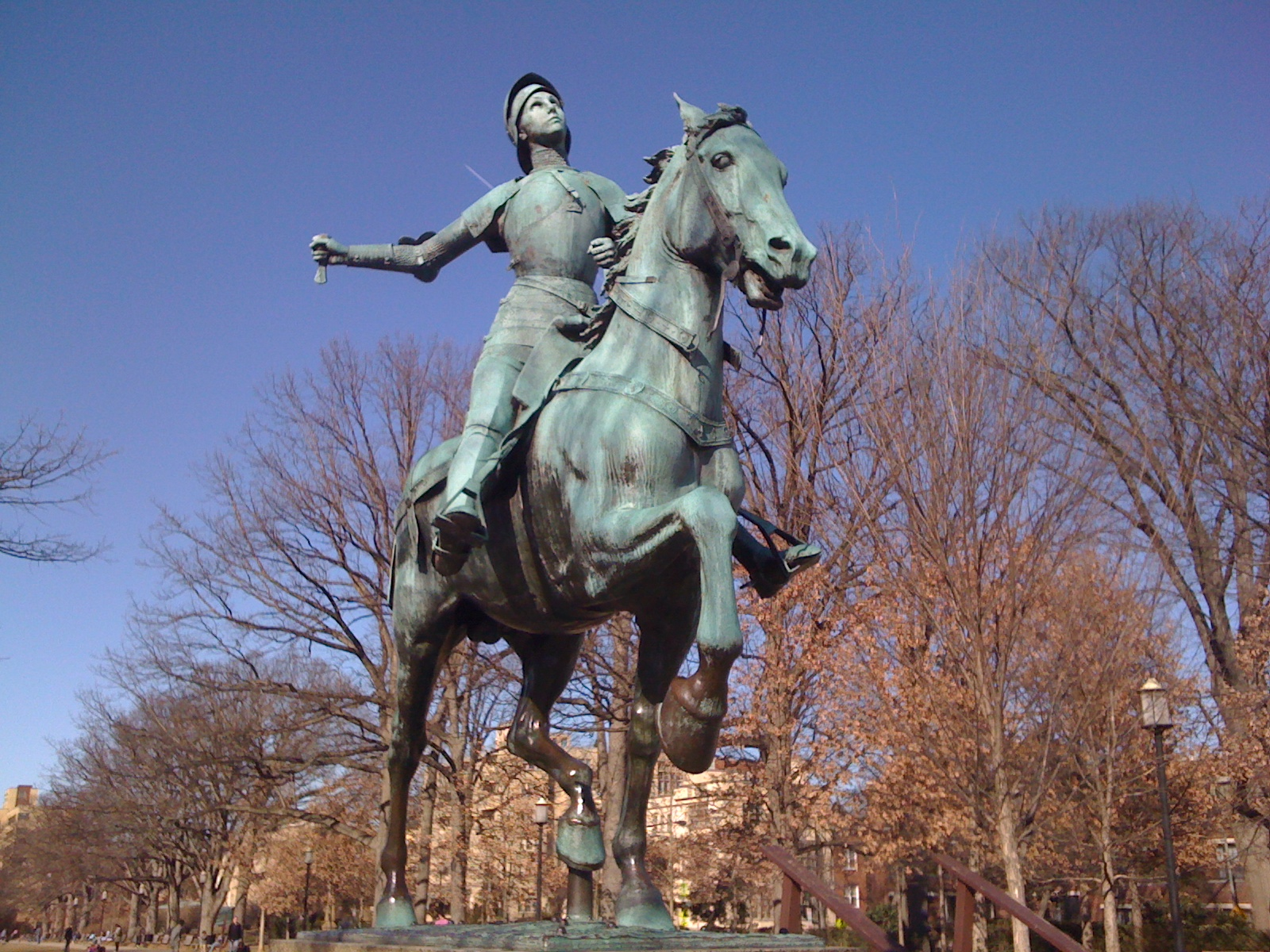
The statue in 2010 missing the sword

In 1929, on the 500th anniversary of Joan of Arc's successful assault on St. Loup during the siege of Orléans, a commemorative event sponsored by the Society of Women of France of New York took place at the statue. Ulysses S. Grant III, Sherrill's successor, presided over the ceremony. Among those in attendance were French Ambassador Paul Claudel and Polifeme, both of whom spoke. Active duty members of the military and members of the Veterans of Foreign Wars attended, and the Marine Band played the national anthems of each country. A military airplane flew over Meridian Hill Park and dropped thousands of poppies.

Since 1932, Joan of Arc's sword has been repeatedly stolen. The first known instance took place in December 1932. It was found in a hedge the following month, "bent but unbroken". The statue was damaged in 1936 by children climbing on top of it. By 1947, the National Capital Parks had replaced the sword several times. The NPS removed the statue in 1977 for $2,330 (equivalent to $12,400 in 2025) worth of repairs and reinstalled it the following year. In 1980, a metalworker hired to replace the missing sword said "[It] has been broken off maybe a dozen times. We put a new sword up, and every time it was there less than a month."

In 1992, members of Washington Parks and People held a rally at the statue, asking that it be repaired and moved to a location facing 16th Street NW. The rally included a woman wearing armor while riding a horse, live music, and a visit by the wife of French Ambassador Jacques Andreani. Despite this, the statue remained without a sword until 2011, when a full restoration costing $43,039 took place. In 2016, the sword was stolen again. Joan of Arc underwent another restoration in 2024 by the Rock Creek Conservancy, which included repairing cracks in the pedestal and replacing missing parts of the horse's bridle and spur. A new sword costing $18,000 was installed that same year as part of the commemoration of Women’s History Month.

== See also ==
- Cultural depictions of Joan of Arc
- Equestrian statue of Joan of Arc (Paris)
