= Meridian Hill Park =

Park in Washington, DC, US

Coordinates: 38.9210°N 77.0357°W

- U.S. National Register of Historic Places
- U.S. National Historic Landmark
- U.S. National Historic Landmark District – Contributing property
- D.C. Inventory of Historic Sites
- Cascading Waterfall, by sculptor John Joseph Earley, is a central feature of the park.
- Location: Bounded by 15th, 16th, Euclid, and W Streets NW; Washington, D.C., U.S.
- Area: 11.88 acres (4.81 ha)
- Built: 1912-1936
- Architect: George Burnap; Horace Peaslee
- Architectural style: Italianate
- Part of: Meridian Hill Historic District (ID14000211)
- NRHP reference No.: 74000273

Significant dates
- Added to NRHP: October 25, 1974
- Designated NHL: April 19, 1994
- Designated DCIHS: November 8, 1964

Meridian Hill Park, also known as Malcolm X Park, is an urban park in Washington, D.C., located in the Meridian Hill neighborhood that straddles the border between Adams Morgan and Columbia Heights. The park is 11.88 acres (4.81 ha) and is bounded by 15th, 16th, W, and Euclid Streets NW. It sits on a prominent hill 1.5 miles (2.4 km) directly north of the White House. The park was added to the District of Columbia Inventory of Historic Sites in 1964, the National Register of Historic Places (NRHP) in 1974, and designated a National Historic Landmark in 1994. The park is also a central feature of the Meridian Hill Historic District, added to the NRHP in 2014.

The land where the park is located was previously inhabited by the Nacotchtank tribe. In 1816, Commodore David Porter purchased the land, then known as Peter's Hill, and renamed it Meridian Hill, after the geodetic marker placed there in 1804 to establish a longitudinal meridian for the city and nation. Porter built a mansion on the hill, which was later occupied by President John Quincy Adams. During the American Civil War, the mansion and surrounding land were commandeered by the Union Army and hosted Camp Cameron. The mansion was destroyed in a fire in 1863. The land was subdivided after the war and a black community developed there, eventually encompassing almost three dozen houses and two grocery stores. Wayland Seminary's large school building was constructed on the northeast corner of the present-day park, but demolished after the school relocated.

After Mary Foote Henderson and her husband built Henderson Castle across the street from Meridian Hill, she purchased surrounding lots and began developing the area, catering to wealthy residents. She used her influence with members of Congress in her efforts, but was unsuccessful in having a new presidential mansion and the Lincoln Memorial being built on Meridian Hill. After the McMillan Plan was published in 1902, efforts were made to build a park on the hill. No action was taken until 1910 when Congress authorized its establishment. Landscape architect George Burnap designed the park's initial plan, but after he was dismissed, his assistant Horace Peaslee took over the project and continued to oversee its completion. Meridian Hill Park's Italianate design was based on Italian gardens and parks Burnap and Peaslee visited during a European tour. Architectural sculptor and carver John Joseph Earley used a then-new type of building material, concrete aggregate, in the park's walls, benches, fountains, and balustrades. Construction of the park took place from 1912 to 1936. During these years, five statues and memorials were erected in the park, including the James Buchanan Memorial.

The park has hosted various social events, protests, and rallies throughout its history. Social events have included the Starlight Chamber Music Concerts series, Summer in the Park program, and cultural festivals. Protests became prominent after the assassination of Martin Luther King Jr., with black nationalists and black militants holding rallies there through the 1980s. A drum circle that began after the assassination of Malcolm X still takes place, attracting people of all races and backgrounds because of changing demographics in the area. Due to this connection, the park is often referred to as Malcolm X Park by some residents. Other protests and rallies at the park have been organized by various groups, including ones demonstrating against wars, globalization, and presidential administrations. The park once had a reputation as a dangerous place, but due to efforts initiated by neighborhood organizations, crime decreased and improvements have been made by the National Park Service, which oversees the park.

== Geography ==
Meridian Hill Park is 11.88 acres (4.81 ha) and is bordered by 15th Street NW on the east, 16th Street NW on the west, Euclid Street NW on the north, and W Street NW on the south. It is located on elevated land, part of the Wicomico-Sunderland escarpment, in the small Meridian Hill neighborhood which straddles Adams Morgan and Columbia Heights. The White House is sited 1.5 miles (2.4 km) directly south of the park, below the terminus of 16th Street NW. The park is divided into two sections, the upper (north) portion, and the lower (south) portion. The park's elevation decreases from north to south, approximately 75 feet (23 m) from its northern border on Euclid Street NW to its southern border on W Street NW.

The park faces south, originally providing sweeping views of the city. Its rectangular design features a central axis and cross axis which are then divided into asymmetrical portions. The lower level of the park is wider, leading to the axis and overall design facing slightly southeast. The upper and lower levels are divided by a large retaining wall. The upper level features an open lawn flanked by sidewalks and trees, and a large terrace overlooking the lower level. The sidewalks on either side of the lawn were originally named Monument Vista Walk (east) and Concert Promenade (west). A winding pathway is located on the opposite sides of the trees, near the park's eastern and western borders. The lower level features a reflecting pool, plaza, and a cascade fountain flanked by stairways. In addition to these stairways, there is a stairway on the western edge of the park and a winding path on its eastern edge.

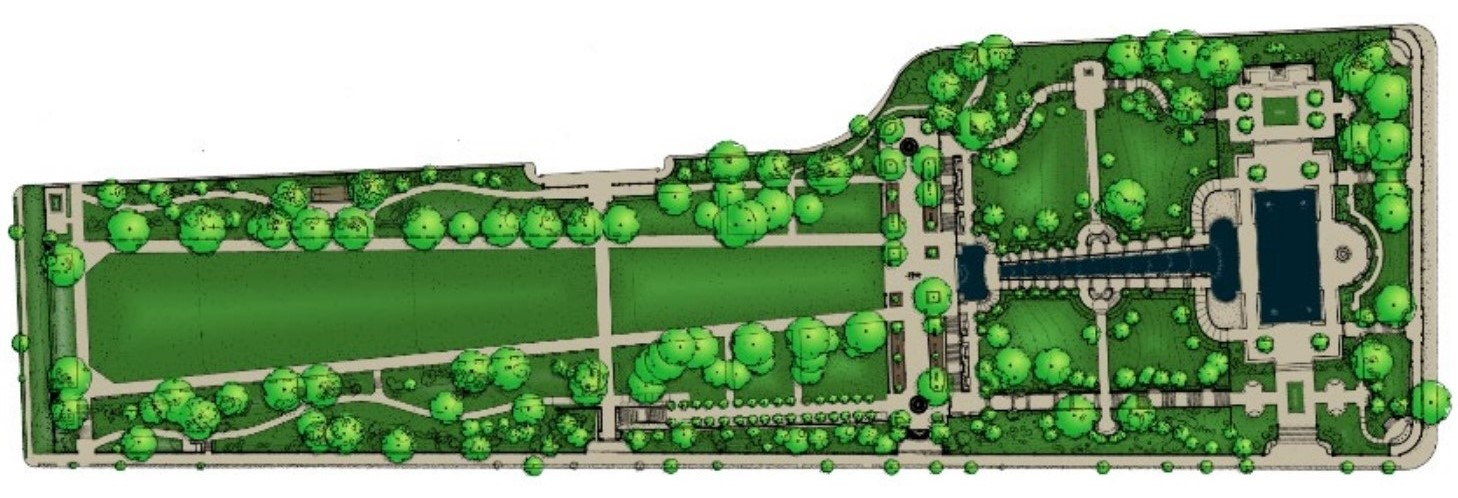
Map of Meridian Hill Park viewed north (left) to south (right)

== History ==
=== Pre-park history ===
The earliest known inhabitants of the land beneath present-day Meridian Hill Park were the Nacotchtank tribe, who by 1700 had either been chased away by white settlers or died from introduced diseases. At the time of Washington, D.C.'s creation in 1790, the land was owned by Robert Peter, a wealthy Georgetown merchant and politician, and was known as Peter's Hill. The area included a stream known as Slash Run that flowed south, emptying into Tiber Creek. In 1804, President Thomas Jefferson had a geodetic marker placed on this large hill. Centered exactly north of the White House, this marker helped to establish a longitudinal meridian for the city and the nation: the "White House meridian". The land was sold to Washington Bowie in 1811 by Peter's son.

Following the War of 1812, Commodore David Porter acquired the hill in 1816 as part of a 110-acre (45 ha) tract of land that he had purchased for $13,000; he named this property "Meridian Hill". On the brow of this prominent hill on his new estate, and close to the marker, Porter reputedly commissioned architect George Hadfield to design a mansion which he also named Meridian Hill. The house was completed in 1819 and faced south with a dramatic view of the city. It was described as "constructed of brick, stuccoed, and 90 feet wide and 54 feet deep...1½ stories with a portico 54 feet by 12 feet."

Due to his unsuccessful attempts to farm the land, Porter went into debt and mortgaged the property in 1820 to Commodore John Rodgers. Following his presidential term, the property was leased to John Quincy Adams in 1829. He and his wife, Louisa, only lived there for a few months before Meridian Hill was sold to J. Florentius Cox. The property was sold to Colonel Gilbert L. Thompson and William Dorsey in 1856. Thompson reportedly owned slaves that worked on Meridian Hill. The two men sold the property to Josiah Sturges who in turn sold it to Olivert Pettit. Shortly before the onset of the Civil War, Meridian Hill was leased to Henry Welden who operated a pleasure park on the property. In an advertisement, Welden described the house as "large and commodious having two large dancing rooms for both ladies and gentlemen". He also stated "I have erected a large pavilion for picnic parties.

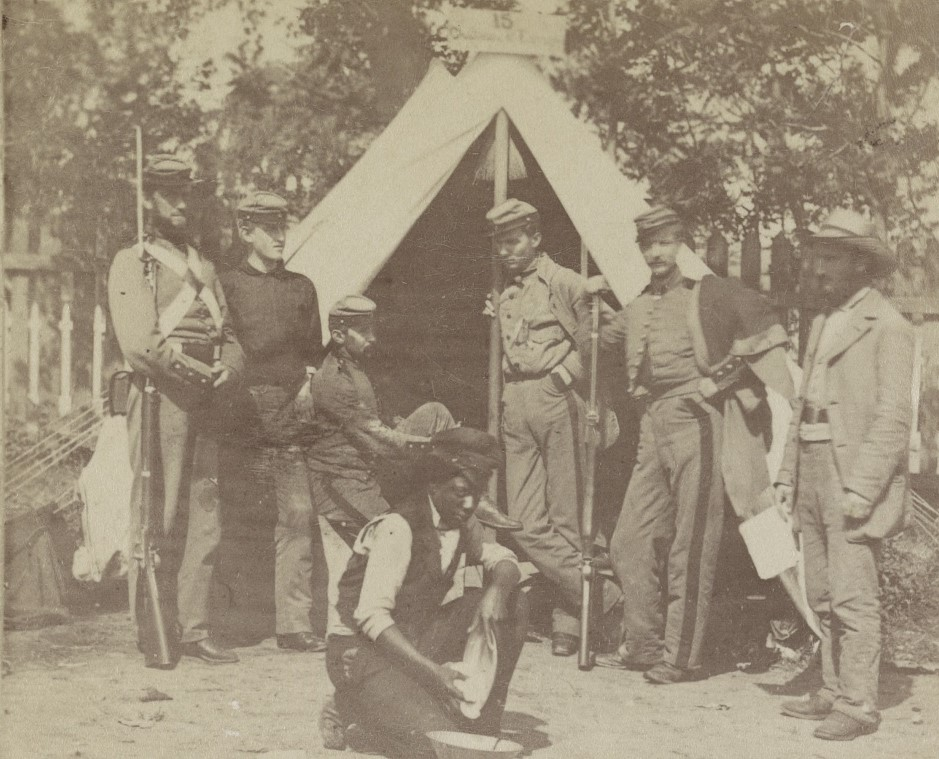
Soldiers from the 7th New York Militia Regiment at Camp Cameron in 1861

After the onset of the war, and with a strategic location overlooking the city, the Meridian Hill estate and mansion, along with the land of neighboring Columbian College (founded 1821, later moving and becoming George Washington University), were taken for use as an army encampment named Camp Cameron. The mansion was converted into a military hospital. The Union Army regiments stationed at Camp Cameron included the 8th Illinois Cavalry Regiment, 19th Massachusetts Infantry Regiment, 8th Michigan Infantry Regiment, 1st New Jersey Infantry Regiment, 3rd New York Infantry Regiment, 7th New York Militia Regiment, and 2nd Vermont Infantry Regiment. As was common with other Union military camps, escaped slaves and freedmen worked or sought shelter at Camp Cameron. In 1863, the mansion was destroyed in a fire. The only remaining buildings on Meridian Hill were a smaller house and barn.

Following the war's conclusion in 1865, Pettit sold the estate to Colonel Isaac E. Messmore in 1867, who subdivided the land. A small black community developed in the area, primarily in the present-day park's northeast section. The community consisted of laborers and house servants residing in simple frame homes, and a grocery store. Wayland Seminary, which was founded in 1865 to educate black preachers and teachers, moved to this community when a large Second Empire school was built in 1875 on the corner of 15th (then called Columbia Avenue) and Euclid Streets NW. Among the alumni who attended Wayland Seminary after its move to Meridian Hill were Booker T. Washington and Adam Clayton Powell Sr. The school building was later demolished after the seminary relocated to Richmond, Virginia. In 1883, Joaquin Miller, nicknamed the "Poet of the Sierras", built a log cabin across the street from the present-day park. He sold his house, the Joaquin Miller Cabin, to Assistant Secretary of State Alvey A. Adee in 1887. It was later relocated to Rock Creek Park.

In 1887, former senator John B. Henderson and his wife, Mary Foote Henderson, resettled in Washington, D.C., and purchased six lots at the intersection of Boundary Street (present-day Florida Avenue) and the newly extended 16th Street NW. The Hendersons then built an elaborate stone house, designed to resemble a castle, which became known as Henderson Castle (also known as Boundary Castle). Mary, with many friends in Congress, had grand plans for the area, including Meridian Hill across the street from her house. She wanted to turn 16th Street NW into a "ceremonial gateway to the nation's capital" similar to the Champs-Élysées in Paris.

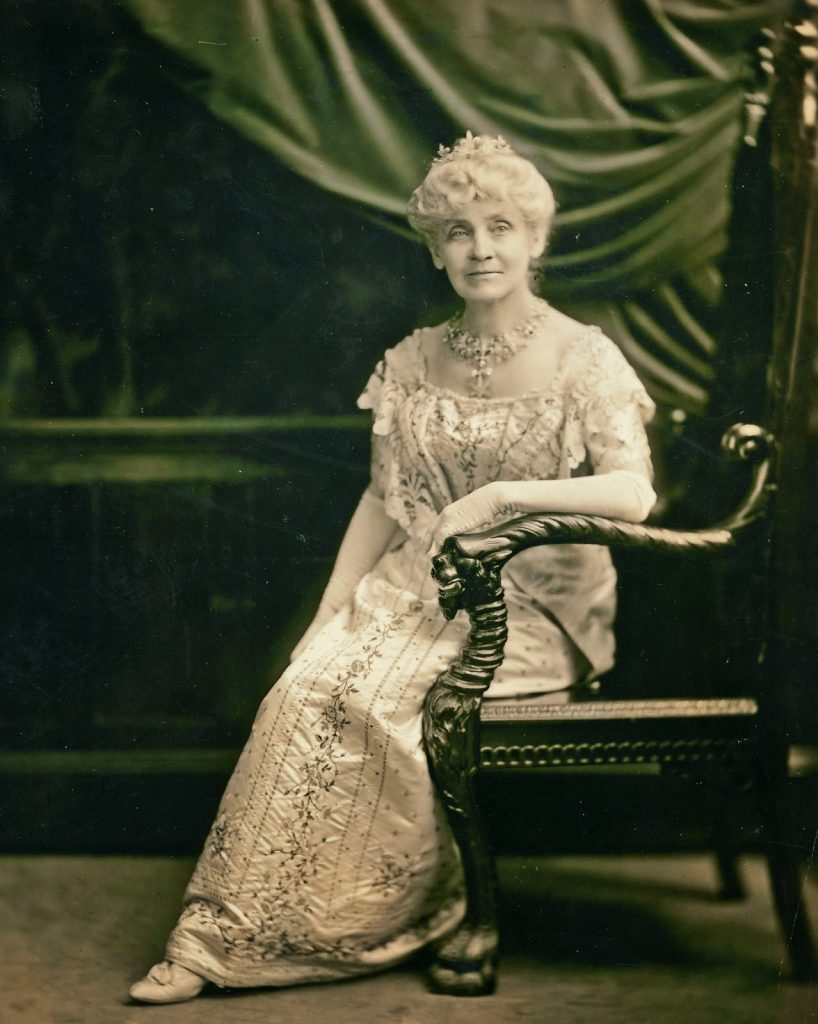
Mary Foote Henderson was instrumental in the park's creation.

Henderson put forward, without success, two ambitious proposals, one by architect Paul J. Pelz in 1898 and the second by Franklin W. Smith in 1900, both with designs to construct a colossal presidential mansion on Meridian Hill to replace the White House. She also unsuccessfully lobbied for the Lincoln Memorial to be built on Meridian Hill. The first Lincoln Memorial proposal Henderson lobbied for was a design by architect John Russell Pope. After this was rejected by the Commission of Fine Arts (CFA), she hired architects Frederick V. Murphy and Walter B. Olmsted to design another plan. It was rejected by Congress.

In addition to her lobbying efforts, with her own money and with architect George Oakley Totten Jr., Henderson planned and then built her own real estate projects from 1906 to 1930, which included creating a succession of large, elaborate embassies and mansions along both 15th and 16th Streets NW. Henderson's projects transformed the Meridian Hill area into a wealthy neighborhood for white residents. These formal structures, which include the present-day Embassy of Lithuania, Embassy of Poland, the Josephine Butler Parks Center, the Pink Palace, the Spanish Cultural Institute, and the former Embassy of France, today frame Meridian Hill Park and help to create a thematic visual appearance to the surrounding area.

=== Park history ===
==== Planning ====
In 1902, the recently formed Senate Park Commission (with its McMillan Plan) undertook a set of formal changes to Washington, D.C.'s civic appearance, most famously by reconfiguring the city's National Mall. This was influenced by the City Beautiful movement, a reform philosophy in the 1890s and 1900s that sought to improve the sanitation and public spaces of cities. Aspects of the plan included extending 16th Street NW beyond the city limits and building "a series of parks and parkways...to secure a harmonious and consistent building up of the entire city of Washington". The plan for parks included building them on privately owned lots, including the ones between 15th and 16th Streets NW owned by Henderson. The commission recommended purchasing Henderson's land, but Congress did not follow suit. In 1906, Henderson began lobbying members of Congress to build the park on Meridian Hill.

A bill was introduced in the Senate in March 1908 which read: "The object of the bill is to acquire for a government reservation tracts of land aggregating about 10 acres in extent, lying between Euclid Street, Columbia avenue or Fifteenth street, W street or Florida Avenue, and Sixteenth street extended, in Hall and Elvan’s subdivision of Meridian Hill. The reservation proposed is similar in nature to the small reservations or parks now existing throughout the city of Washington...There are no parks of this type north of Florida avenue, and nothing in the shape of public reservations to the south, except some small triangles...This proposed reservation lies along the great boulevard, Sixteenth Street, which connects the White House with Rock Creek Park." Despite the Senate then passing legislation that stated, "there [was] no one site in the District as suitable for a government reservation [as Meridian Hill]", no plans were made.

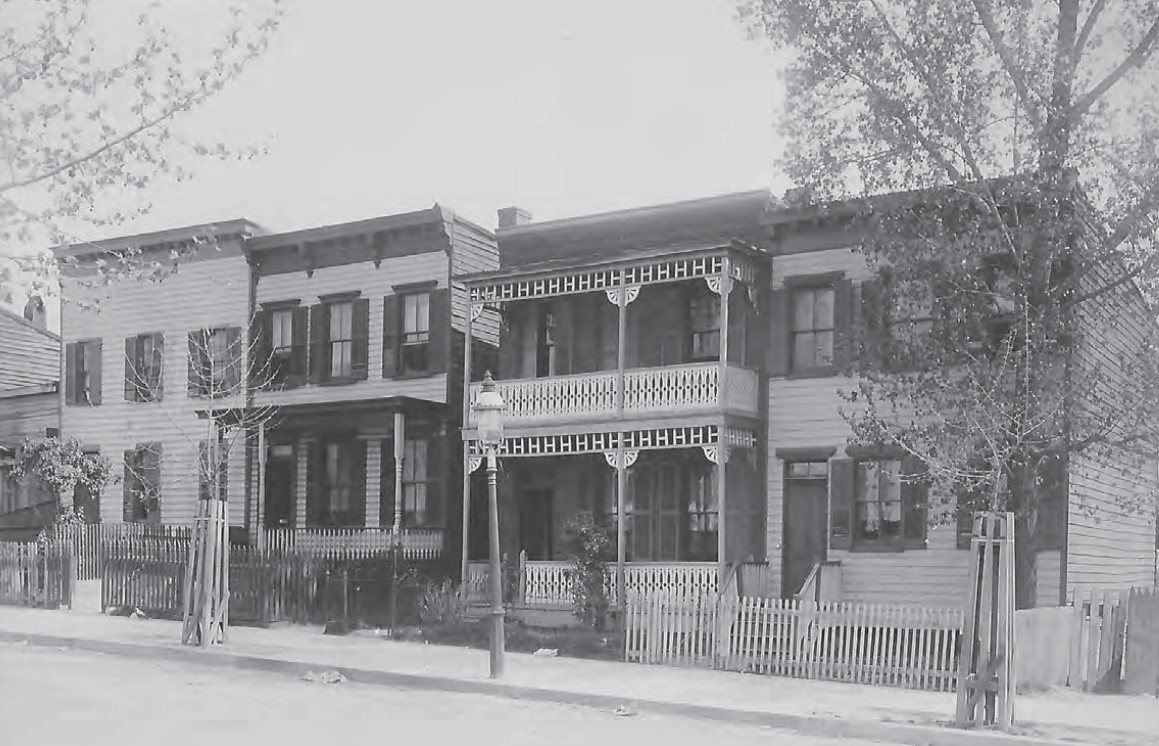
Homes on the present-day northern edge of the park that were demolished in the 1910s via eminent domain

In 1910, the CFA recommended purchasing Henderson's land. Senate Bill 7725 was proposed, which would authorize purchasing the property and condemning the buildings that stood there. On June 25, 1910, Congress approved establishing Meridian Hill Park, which would be overseen by the United States Army Corps of Engineers's (USACE) lead officer. Congress authorized $490,000 to purchase the property. At the time there were at least 35 houses in the present-day park's boundaries, all but two occupied by black residents, and two grocery stores. One of the stores was operated by Russian-Jewish immigrants. Harry M. Clabaugh, chief justice of the Supreme Court of the District of Columbia, appointed white businessmen to appraise the value of these properties. A few of the property owners accepted the appraised values, but the remainder did not. The last of these holdouts were forced to relocate after the Chief of Engineers approved plans to demolish all buildings within the park's boundaries via eminent domain. The remaining families that were forced to move attempted to relocate near each other. The smaller house built by Porter that was not destroyed in the 1863 fire was demolished.

==== Design and construction ====
The Office of Public Buildings and Grounds (OPBG), under the jurisdiction of the Interior Department, chose its lead landscape architect, George Burnap, to design Meridian Hill Park. Burnap asked his former student, Horace Peaslee, to serve as project assistant. Burnap submitted a proposed design to the CFA in April 1913 which won preliminary approval the following March. A few months later, Burnap and Peaslee joined a delegation of the OPBG on a tour of major European parks in Italy, France, Spain, and Switzerland to draw inspiration for Meridian Hill Park's design. Burnap based his design on the Pincian Hill park in Rome. It was to be "centered around a single, longitudinal axis extending roughly north-south through the site." It included an Italian Renaissance-style terraced fountain cascade with pools and a plaza in the lower level of the park, and a grand terrace, fountain, and formal gardens in a French Baroque style in the upper level. His initial plan also included a requirement by the CFA for a memorial to former President James Buchanan.

Construction of the park began in 1915 when architectural sculptor and craftsman John Joseph Earley started work on building massive retaining walls facing 16th Street NW. This wall supports the upper level of the park, which rises above a sloping hill overlooking the lower level. The original design was for the retaining wall to be covered in stucco. Earley found the finish product "dull". He began working with concrete aggregate, a then-new type of building material consisting of a specially washed and exposed-pebble surface set into the concrete substrate. He called this material "architectural concrete". Earley would go on to use this material for walls, fountains, benches, and balustrades throughout the park. Construction of the retaining wall was finished by April 1916, and a few months later, work on grading the lower level was also completed. By that point, $152,500 had been spent on the design and construction of the park, not counting the initial purchase of the land.

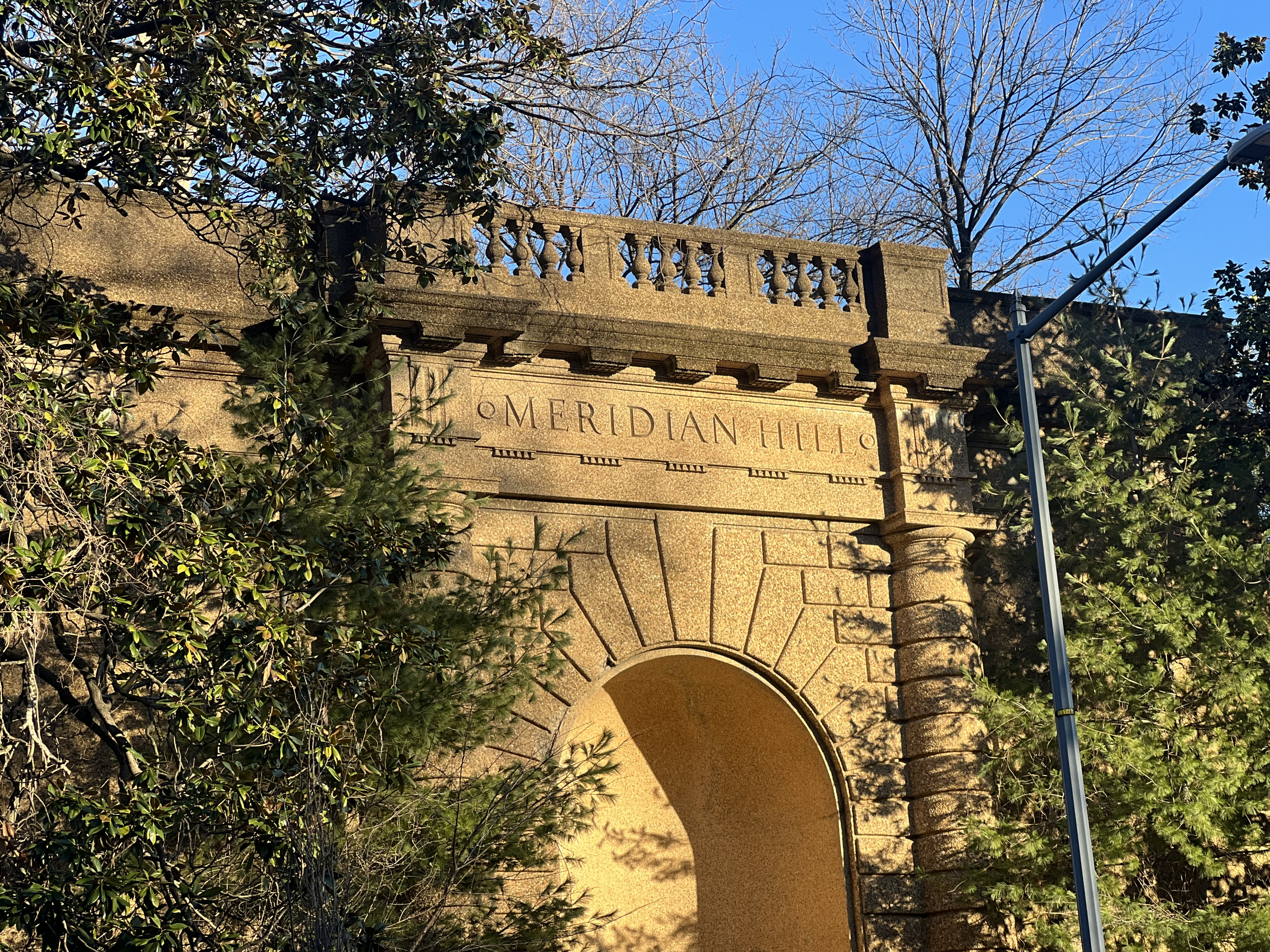
An example of the concrete aggregate material utilized by John Joseph Earley throughout the park.

Burnap was dismissed from the OPBG in August 1916 and Peaslee took over his role as lead landscape architect the following year. He altered some of the design features, which included replacing the planned formal gardens on the upper level with an open mall, suitable for gatherings and performances. He also simplified the reflecting pool design and removed a planned bridge over the cascading waterfall. Peaslee drew inspiration from the Villa Borghese gardens and Villa d'Este in Italy, with the end result being Meridian Hill Park's design based on a collection of Italian gardens and parks. After submitting a proposal to the CFA in 1919, landscape architectural firm Vitale, Brinckerhoff, and Geiffert was hired to design the planting scheme. Their recommendations were included in the park's design the following year. Between 1917 and 1923, an additional $240,000 was spent on the park's construction.

After the park's upper level was completed in 1923, that portion was opened to the public. The first public artworks in the park were installed in the 1920s: the Dante Alighieri statue, the Joan of Arc equestrian statue, and the Serenity sculpture. The Meridian marker installed in 1804 was removed when 16th Street NW was widened. It was relocated to the southwest corner of 14th and R Streets NW and used as a carriage step stool. It is unknown what happened to the marker since that time. A plaque was installed on the park's 16th Street NW retaining wall noting the marker's former location.

During the early years of the park's construction, the surrounding real estate market began to develop. After successfully thwarting Harry Wardman's plan to construct an apartment building on the northern edge of the park, Henderson was unable to stop the Meridian Mansions being built just north of her home, across the street from the park. Of greater concern was construction of the eight-story Hadleigh Apartments (now known as the Camden Roosevelt) on the southern edge of the park which partially blocked sweeping views of the city. The planned roof garden with pergolas was not built after Henderson used her influence with members of Congress to have a bill passed in 1920 limiting the Hadleigh's height.

Work on the park's lower level was delayed due to a lack of funding from Congress. Between 1924 and 1927, only $98,460 was allocated for the park's construction. Following debate between members of the House of Representatives and Senate, $92,554 was allocated for work in 1928, less than one-fifth of the requested $500,000 to complete the lower park's original design. Due to these limits, Peaslee submitted a final redesign to the CFA which was approved in March 1928. The changes included eliminating a planned concert pavilion and an elaborate entrance facing 16th Street NW. Funding did increase the following years, with over $400,000 allocated between 1929 and 1932. Most of the park's major projects were completed by 1932, which included the memorial to Buchanan. The following year, ownership of the park was transferred to the National Park Service (NPS). No funds were allocated for the park's construction between 1933 and 1935. During the last year of construction by the Public Works Administration in 1936, $145,000 was spent, bring the total cost of the project to $1,536,209. (equivalent to $35,642,259.17 in 2025) Meridian Hill Park officially opened to the public on September 26, 1936. Two months later, the last major public artwork in the park, the Noyes Armillary Sphere, was installed.

==== 1930s-1950s ====
Despite OPBG director Clarence O. Sherrill and his successor Ulysses S. Grant III enforcing segregation in many of the city's public spaces, Meridian Hill Park was never officially segregated. This did not stop some white residents from avoiding the park or complaining about the presence of black visitors, many of whom lived in nearby predominantly black neighborhoods. In a letter to the OPBG, a white resident wrote: "Do you know that young colored men + boys are using the beautiful main entrance to Meridian Hill Park for a meeting place, where they have a general good time singing, dancing + music with guitar and ukulele? Those amusements are all right in their place, but I think that is hardly the place...Please do something about it." Despite such protests, black residents continued visiting the park.

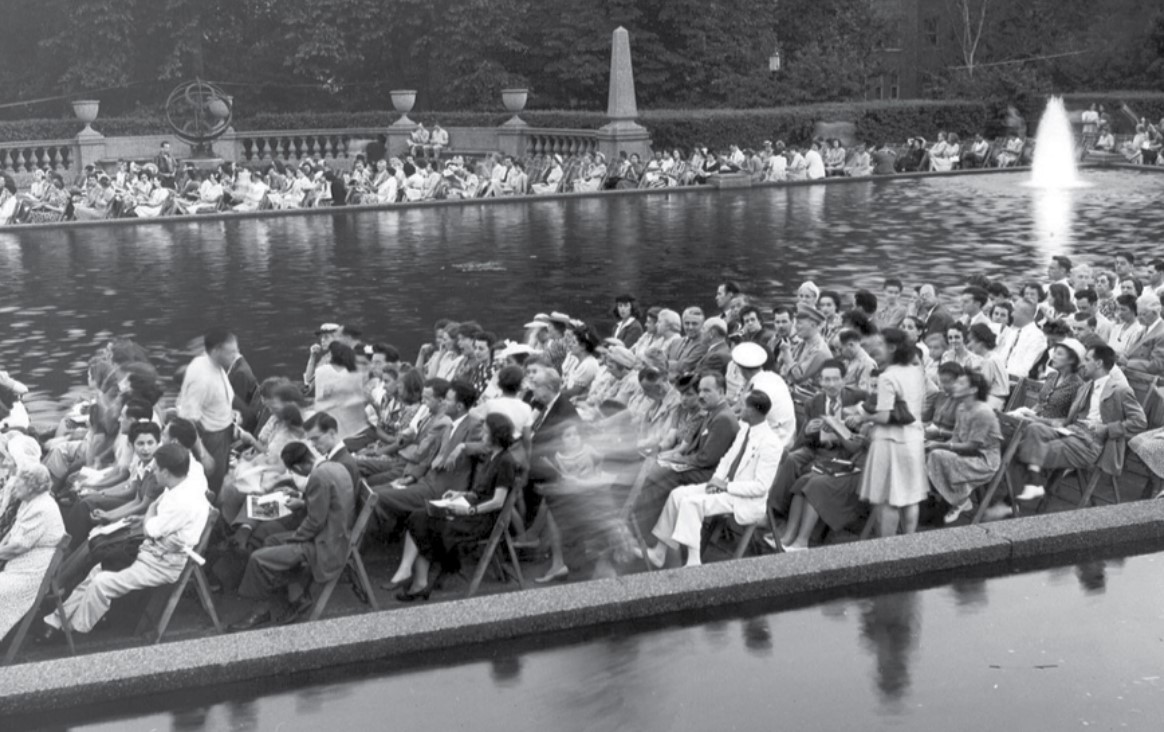
Attendees of a Starlight Chamber Music Concerts event in the 1940s seated around the lower level reflecting pool. The Noyes Armillary Sphere can be seen in the background.

Meridian Hill Park has a long history of hosting social events, including concerts and theater performances. Concerts by the United States Marine Band, United States Navy Band, and United States Army Band took place from the 1920s until the 1950s. The Rambling Theater project, which performed plays throughout the city's parks, was established in 1935 and held events at Meridian Hill Park for a few years. During World War II, the city's population dramatically increased and programs were held to entertain residents. From 1941 to 1944, Starlight Chamber Music Concerts took place in the park's lower level, which accommodated up to 2,000 people. Performers included the Primrose Quartet, the Trapp Family Singers, and the Martha Graham Dance Company. In 1943, The Washington Post sponsored the Post Starlight Concerts series at the park. After the National Theatre closed after refusing to integrate its audience, the Washington Theatre Festival took place at the park in 1949, welcoming all races. The festival included the construction of a temporary stage and opened with a performance starring Elisabeth Bergner.

In addition to these concerts and theater performances, during the war the park hosted an incendiary bomb demonstration for local air raid wardens, drilling practices for the American Legion, and services marking Flag Day. After the war, many religious events took place at the park, including an event in 1948 that led to noise complaints from area residents. The NPS responded by denying event park permits "for any other purposes than those for which the area primarily is devoted". This policy excluded events which took place on religious holidays. In April 1952, Queen Juliana of the Netherlands attended a concert at the park along with President Harry S. Truman. She presented Truman with a temporary carillon, a gift symbolizing the friendship between the two countries, which remained in the park until the Netherlands Carillon project was completed in 1954. WWDC held a carillon concert series at the park during the summer of 1952. In 1958, the anti-nuclear Walk for Peace Committee held an event in the park. Another anti-nuclear group, the Committee for Non-Violent Action, held a similar event there two years later.

==== 1960s-1990s ====
White flight and planning for urban renewal projects escalated in the 1960s, resulting in a large proportion of black and Hispanic/Latino residents in the surrounding area. Poverty and crime in the neighborhood increased, with visitors in the park sometimes attacked, leading to it being seen as a "safe haven" for criminals. The University Neighborhood Council (UNC), a local group formed to improve the community near Howard University, began planning social events to revive the park. The UNC hosted four free concerts in 1963, with the last being attended by approximately 7,000 people. Performers included the Watergate Symphony Band, Capital Wood Wind Quartet, and the Meridian Hill String Quartet. The events were such a success that the summer concert series continued through 1966. To better reflect the neighborhood demographics, the series included music and cultural dances by Jamaican, Trinidadian, and Mexican performers. The UNC also hosted an Art in the Park program until 1966. On November 8, 1964, the park was added to the District of Columbia Inventory of Historic Sites.

Following the 1965 assassination of Malcolm X, a drum circle was held at the park as a way of honoring his memory. The Howard Theatre's house drummer, Baba Ngoma, was the first person to drum at the park. The drum circle became a weekly event. After the UNC discontinued the concert series, the park sat mostly empty and became the second most dangerous park in the city. The city zoning commission began to allow "high-rise, medium-high density apartments" in the neighborhood, and shortly after the ten-story Meridian Towers apartment building was constructed in 1968 on the southern edge of the park, further obstructing views of the city. Henderson Castle, which had been demolished in 1949, was replaced with 216 townhomes in the 1970s.

The 1968 Washington, D.C., riots that followed the assassination of Martin Luther King Jr. had a profound effect on parts of the city, including the Meridian Hill neighborhood. The federal government worked with religious and community leaders, neighborhood associations, and political groups to restore the area. Industrial designer Russel Wright was hired by the NPS to suggest improvements to area parks. The changes to Meridian Hill Park included installation of concealed lighting along sidewalks and sprays in the reflecting pool, and the addition of picnic tables, chairs, concession stands, badminton courts, and volleyball courts. The cascading waterfall and other fountains in the park were equipped with a night-time lighting system.

A few months after the riots, the Summer in the Park program was established, to encourage inner-city youth to enjoy local parks. The program's opening event, attended by approximately 20,000 people, was hosted by actress Pearl Bailey and socialite Perle Mesta. Performers included Bailey, Cab Calloway, Hildegarde, and local dance and drummer troupes. Following the event's success, additional programs were established at the park, including talent shows, a puppet theater, concerts, and outdoor film screenings. For African Day, the upper level of the park hosted a bazaar for African goods, a fashion show featuring African clothing, along with music and dance performances.

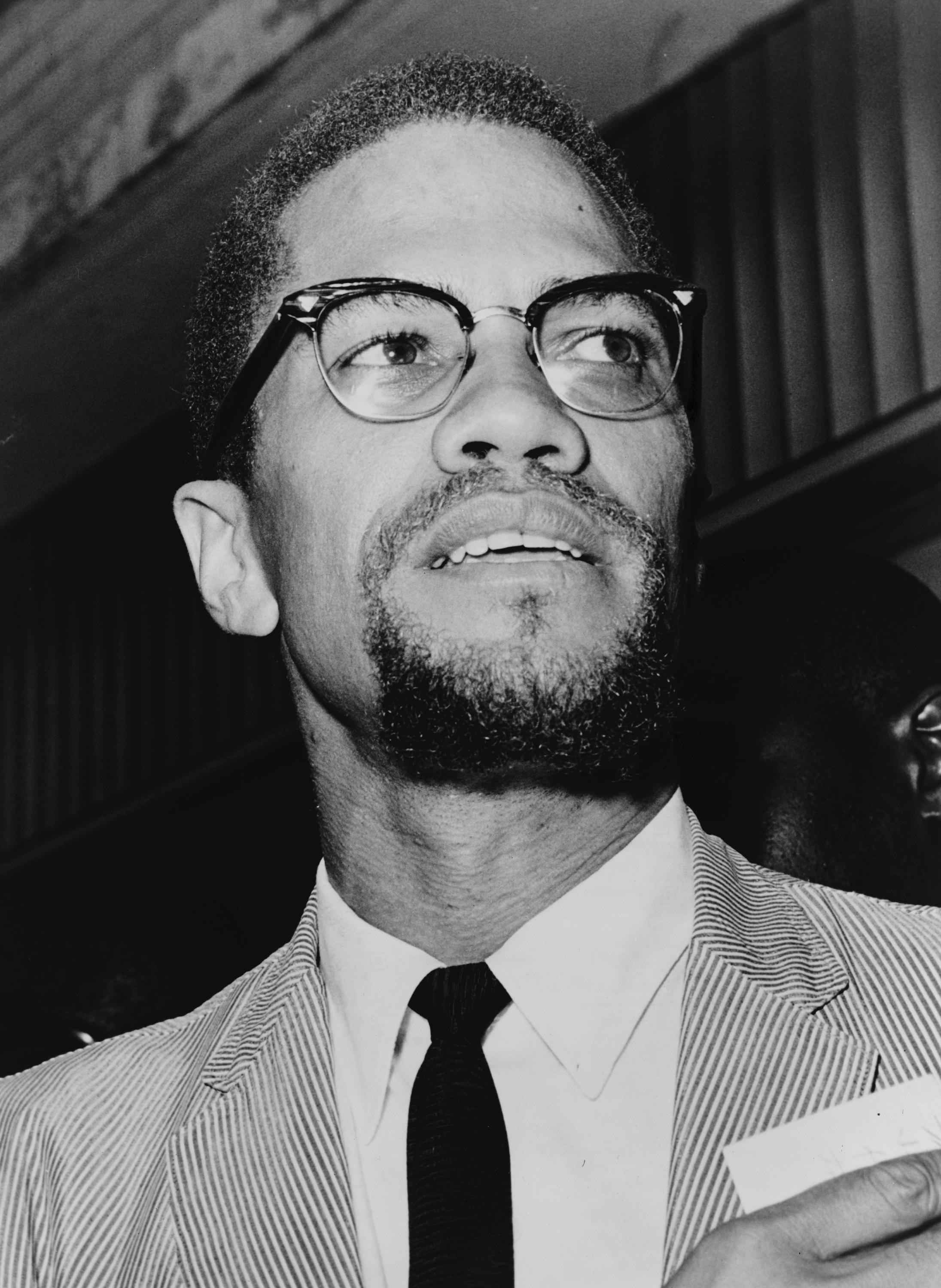
Since the late 1960s, the park has also been referred to as Malcolm X Park in honor of revolutionary activist Malcolm X.

After the assassination of King, black nationalists and black militants began holding events at the park. The Black Panther Party (BPP), Black United Front (BUF), and All-African People's Revolutionary Party (A-APRP) held rallies there during the late 1960s and early 1970s, the latter organizing annual events for African Liberation Day and Malcolm X Day. During a 1969 event honoring Malcolm X's birthday, singer Roberta Flack performed. At a 1970 rally, BPP deputy minister Elbert Howard addressed the approximately 3,000 people in attendance at the park in hopes of securing a location for the Revolutionary People's Constitutional Convention's second meeting. That meeting took place three months later and a concert was held in the park, attended by 3,000 to 5,000 people. According to The Washington Post, "the session ended with the formation of a coalition among the Panthers, Women's Liberation and Gay Liberation movement...to push for the issue of equal rights in the new [Panthers] constitution."

At some point in the late 1960s, black activists began using the name Malcolm X Park when referring to Meridian Hill Park. According to author George Derek Musgrove, "one of the things that the activists that renamed the park wanted to ensure was that that area was black people's land". It is unknown who coined the term, but according to BUF member R. H. Booker, his group did. The BUF "felt entitled to rename the park because neighboring Columbia Heights and Reed-Cooke was a bastion of black activism and community groups staged rallies in the park to support the Black Panthers, Pan-Africanism, and myriad local causes." Activist Angela Davis has often been credited with coining the term, but according to historian Elise Elder in her NPS report Meridian Hill Park - African American Experiences Since the Civil War: A Special Resource Study, no evidence has been found to support this claim. In 1970, Representative Adam Clayton Powell Jr. of New York introduced a bill in Congress to change the park's name to Malcolm X Park, but he was unsuccessful. According to the NPS, the presence of a presidential memorial in the park means it cannot be named after anyone else.

Protests and rallies at the park covering a myriad of issues continued throughout the 1970s. Protests against the Vietnam War took place in 1971 and 1974, including one by the Third World Task Force Against the War in Southeast Asia. The roughly 2,000 supporters at the park marched to the National Mall where they joined 200,000 protesters at the Vietnam War Out Now rally. When Davis was acquitted of charges in 1972 related to the Marin County Civic Center attacks, a celebration was held at the park by the D.C. Committee to Free Angela Davis. That same year around 800 teachers held a rally, protesting pay and class sizes. Activist Julius Hobson spoke at a rally in 1973 protesting the city's treatment of prisoners. A few months later, Korean Americans protested the kidnapping of activist and future South Korean president Kim Dae-jung.

Members of the Workers League and Young Socialist Alliance marched from the park to Lafayette Square in 1974. Additional rallies held that decade include three (1973, 1976, 1979) opposing apartheid in South Africa, and one in 1976 supporting the Wilmington Ten. In 1978, around 3,000 people attended a rally organized by the American Indian Movement. Speakers included actors Marlon Brando and Dick Gregory, and politician Douglas E. Moore. In addition to rallies and protests, social events took place at the park during the 1970s. A concert in 1973 featured Millie Jackson, two members of The Manhattans, and Father's Children. In 1975, the Ghana Festival took place, featuring Ghanaian films and music. After the Summer in the Arts program ceased in 1976, Tomorrow World's Art Center began hosting an art festival. The Caribbean Summer in the Parks event was held at the park in 1978, which included music and dancing.

On October 25, 1974, the park was added to the National Register of Historic Places (NRHP). Because of this, there were efforts to clean up and refurbish the often trash-ridden and dangerous park. In 1976, repairs were made to fountain plumbing, sidewalks, and lighting fixtures. Seven maintenance workers were assigned to the park and it was frequently patrolled by the United States Park Police (USPP). In 1981, the NPS instituted a curfew at the park at 9pm, but despite these changes, a large number of crimes still took place. Courtland Milloy, a columnist for The Washington Post, called it "Crack Park" because "people congregate [there] throughout the night to deal in crack. They smoke it, sell it, trade sex for it, and, when push comes to shove, pull out guns for it." According to Michael Willrich, author of The Autobiography of Malcolm X Park, crack was sold in the surrounding area during the 1980s. The park was predominantly a place where marijuana was sold.

In 1981 and 1982, the All-African Cultural Festival included food, music, dancing, and crafts. The first years of the city's reggae festival took place at the park and included performances by Carl Malcolm and several reggae bands. During the 1980s, additional protests took place at the park. A rally supporting the 1980 Miami riots was sponsored by the BUF, NAACP, and National Urban League. The Revolutionary Communist Party, USA, staged a rally in 1980, then marched through areas of the city damaged during the 1968 riots. Thousands of protesters gathered in 1982 to demonstrate against President Ronald Reagan's foreign policy towards El Salvador, marching from the park to the White House. The 1983 Gay and Lesbian Pride Day parade route began at the park.

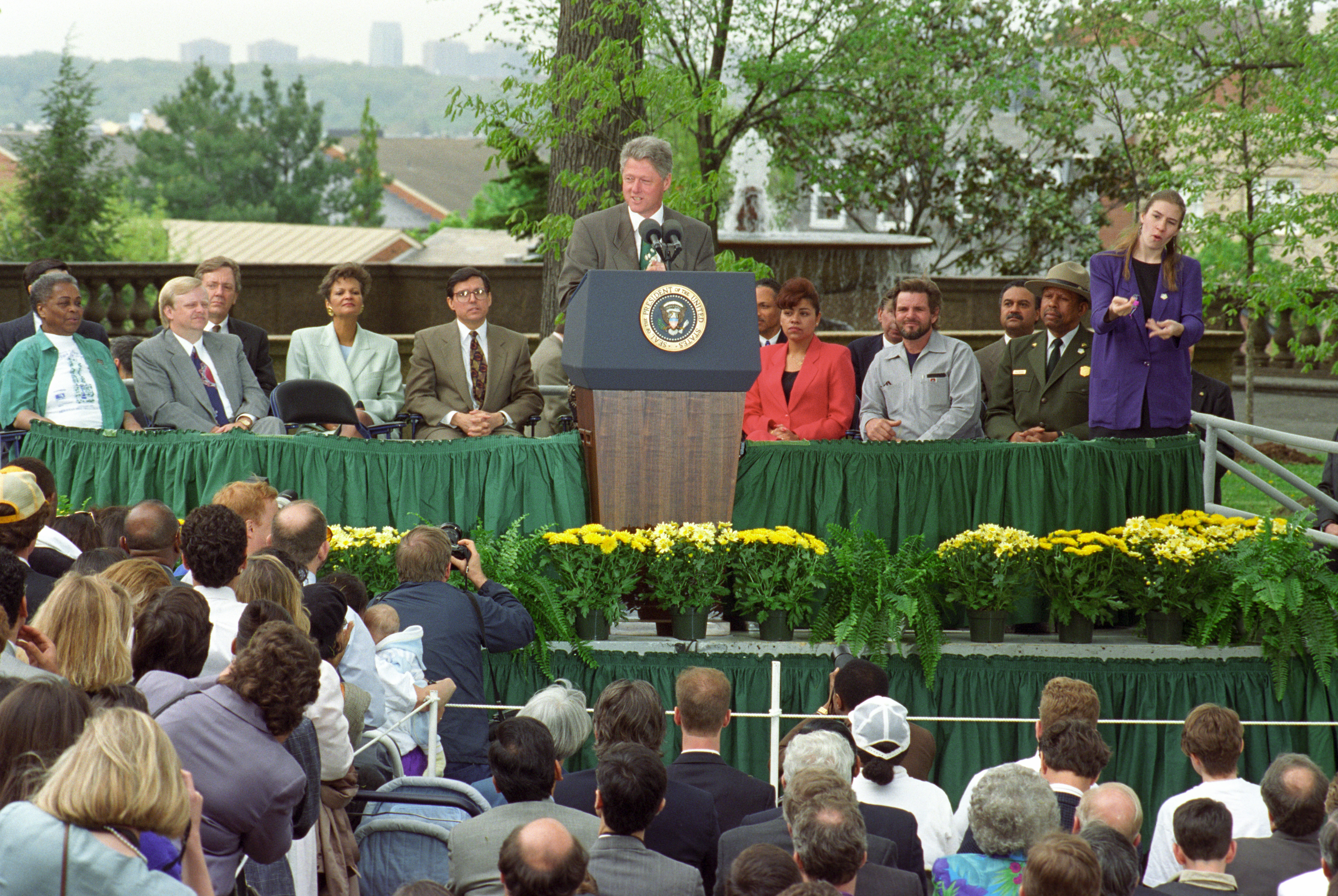
In 1994, President Bill Clinton delivered an address on Earth Day at the park and acknowledged improvements initiated by the Friends of Meridian Hill organization.

The A-APRP continued hosting annual Africa Liberation Day events, including one in 1983 attended by an estimated 3,000 people, and another in 1985 with approximately 2,000 people. During the late-1980s, protests by black nationalists no longer took place at the park due to the demise of the BPP and other militant groups. In 1986, Mayor Marion Barry and actress Betty Thomas spoke at rally honoring the Great Peace March for Global Nuclear Disarmament. The following year, around 500 fundamentalist Muslim Students Association members loyal to Ruhollah Khomeini demonstrated at the park before marching to the Islamic Center of Washington.

Trash, graffiti, and crime continued to plague the park in the early 1990s. In response, neighborhood residents became more involved in the park's stewardship and programming, and four people (Steve Colman, Josephine Butler, Morris Samuel and Howard Coleman) formed the Friends of Meridian Hill (FMH) in 1990. This organization organized volunteer nighttime patrols to combat crime, planted trees, produced a wide range of community arts and educational programs in the park, including twilight concerts, and suggested improvements to the NPS. While these changes were made, an anti-war protest took place in 1991 by members of the National African-American Network Against U.S. Intervention in the Gulf, demonstrating against the Gulf War. A local social activist, Dick Gregory, began a planned winter-long protest in 1993 to highlight the city's drug epidemic and alcohol consumption. His efforts led to "no alcoholic beverages" being installed in the park.

Along with improvements by the FMH and NPS, the USPP added plainclothes officers and K-9 unit patrols to further deter crime. Incidences of crime decreased by 82% between 1990 and 1992, and by 1993, the park was relatively safe. On April 19, 1994, the park was designated a National Historic Landmark. A few days later on Earth Day, President Bill Clinton delivered an environmental address at the park and mentioned the efforts by the FMH. A month later, Clinton presented the organization with the Partnership Leadership Award in a White House ceremony. The FMH merged with the Friends of District of Columbia Parks and Recreation in 1998 to form Washington Parks & People.

==== 21st century ====
Meridian Hill Park continued to host rallies and protests in the 21st century. In April 2000, the Mobilization for Global Justice staged a protest against the International Monetary Fund and World Bank, including speeches and a concert held at the park. Another anti-globalization protest attended by around 3,000 people took place in 2001, hosted by the Washington Peace Center and American Friends Service Committee's local office. In the lead up to the 2003 invasion of Iraq, a protest march organized by Code Pink began at the park. Speakers at the rally included singer Michelle Shocked, novelist Maxine Hong Kingston, activist Helen Caldicott, and author Alice Walker, who had previously written Meridian, whose protagonist is named Meridian Hill. Black Voices for Peace, led by activist Damu Smith, staged a rally in 2003 protesting the war in Iraq. Speakers included activists Martin Luther King III, Walter Fauntroy, and talk show host Joe Madison. Additional protests at the park during the 2000s include ones demonstrating against the 2004 election of President George W. Bush and passage of the Emergency Economic Stabilization Act of 2008.

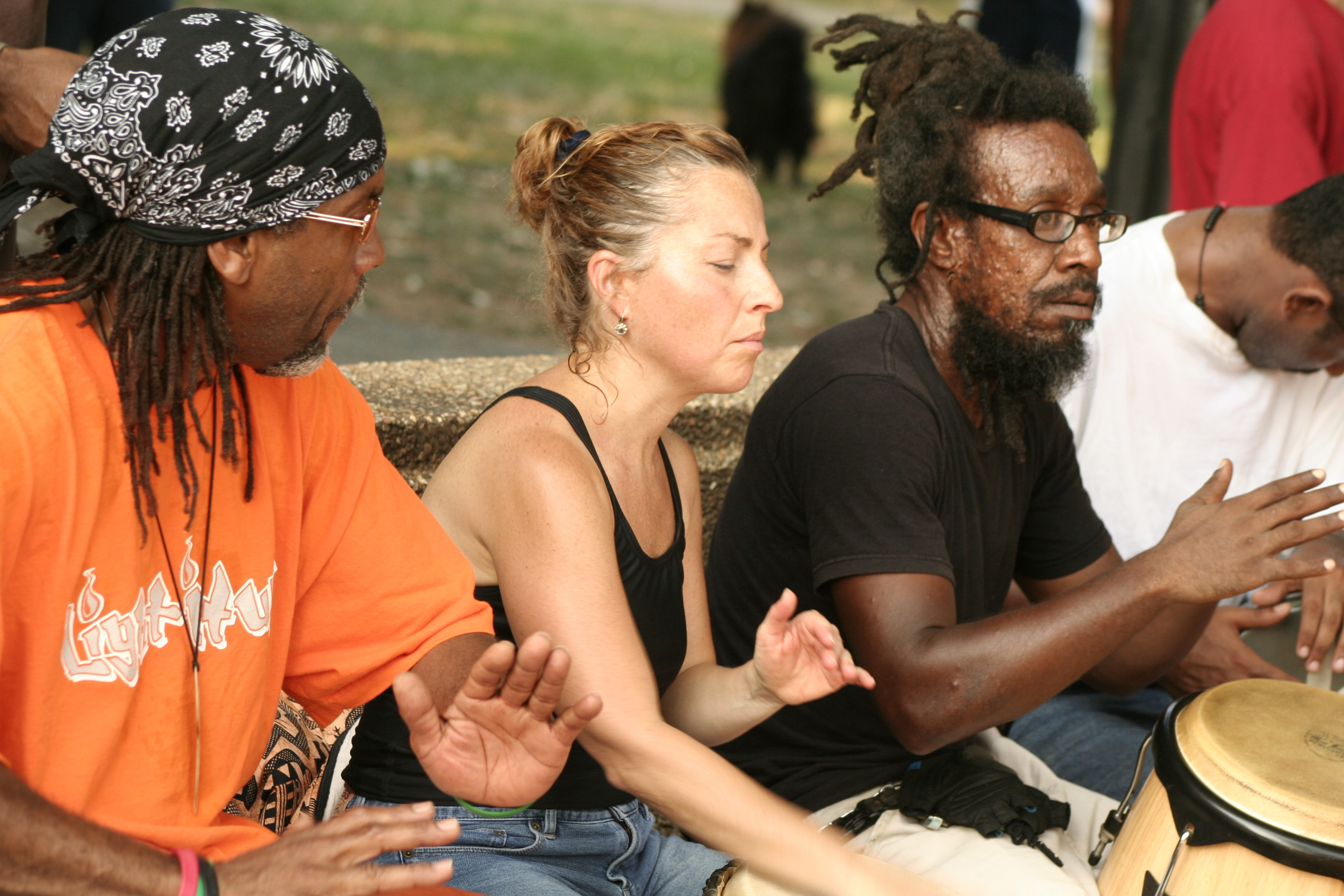
A weekly drum circle and dancing event takes place in the park.

In 2012, Howard University students staged a rally protesting the killing of Trayvon Martin and racial profiling. When the shooter, George Zimmerman, was found not guilty in 2013, a prayer vigil took place at the park. The following year, another prayer vigil took place after the killing of Michael Brown. During the second inauguration of President Barack Obama, protests gathered at the park demonstrated against drone warfare, the National Defense Authorization Act, and the imprisonment of Chelsea Manning. Protests occurred during the first and second inaugurations of President Donald Trump in 2017 and 2025, respectively.

On May 21, 2014, the Meridian Hill Historic District was added to the NRHP. The historic district encompasses the park, and 51 contributing buildings and objects located along 15th and 16th Streets NW, and some nearby streets. The NPS hosted the first National Park Rx Day at Meridian Hill Park in 2016, which included Zumba classes, walking, and bicycle rides. In 2020, the park's lower level was closed by the NPS for a multi-year rehabilitation project. Repairs were made to damaged walls, sidewalks, and stairs. A wheelchair accessible entrance was installed, and over two dozen trees and almost 500 shrubs planted. The lower level reopened in 2023. Despite these improvements, the cascading fountain was not repaired. Restoration work to the fountain costing $10.68 million began in 2026 and included temporarily closing the lower plaza and areas surrounding the fountain. Social events continue to be held at the park, including snowball fights, soccer and frisbee games, and the long-running drum circle.

On Sunday afternoons, people gather in the upper park to dance and participate in the drum circle. This activity regularly attracts both enthusiastic dancers and professional drummers. Despite gentrification of the surrounding neighborhoods, the drum circle attracts black residents who still hold a strong connection to the park, especially since they were the only ones attending it for decades. Due to the change in demographics, people of all races and backgrounds attend the drum circle, sometimes to the annoyance of longtime participants. This diversity in park attendance has led to it being called "a virtual Bruegel painting of the human tableaux that represents the adjacent neighborhoods of Adams Morgan, Mount Pleasant, Columbia Heights, and Shaw."

== Public artwork ==
A central feature of Meridian Hill Park is the 13-basin Cascading Waterfall which was inspired by 16th-century Italian villas. Located in the park's lower level, the concrete fountain was designed with a recirculating water system featuring an elaborate series of pumps. Water from two fountains on the terrace flows down to three columns and two spills located in a retaining wall. From there the water flows into two basins and spouts and overflows into thirteen cascading basins. The length of the basins increases as water flows down to a pool at the bottom of the waterfall. The pool features waterspouts depicting grotesque masks, water flowing from two dolphin carvings, and multiple jets.

There are five statues and memorials in the park. The first one, Dante Alighieri, was installed in 1921 and depicts Italian poet and philosopher Dante Alighieri, considered one of the greatest literary figures of the Late Middle Ages. He is one of Italy's national poets, the "father" of the Italian language, and his work Divina Commedia (Divine Comedy) is one of the greatest pieces of Italian literary work. The statue, by artist Ettore Ximenes, was a gift of Italian American businessman Carlo Barsotti, founder of Il Progresso Italo-Americano. It is a cast of the statue in New York City's Dante Park which was also installed in 1921. The statue in Meridian Hill Park was dedicated on December 1, 1921. Among those in attendance at the ceremony were President Warren G. Harding and First Lady Florence Harding, Italian and French diplomats, and hundreds of Italian Americans. The statue is located east of the Cascading Waterfall, in an area nicknamed the Poet's Corner.

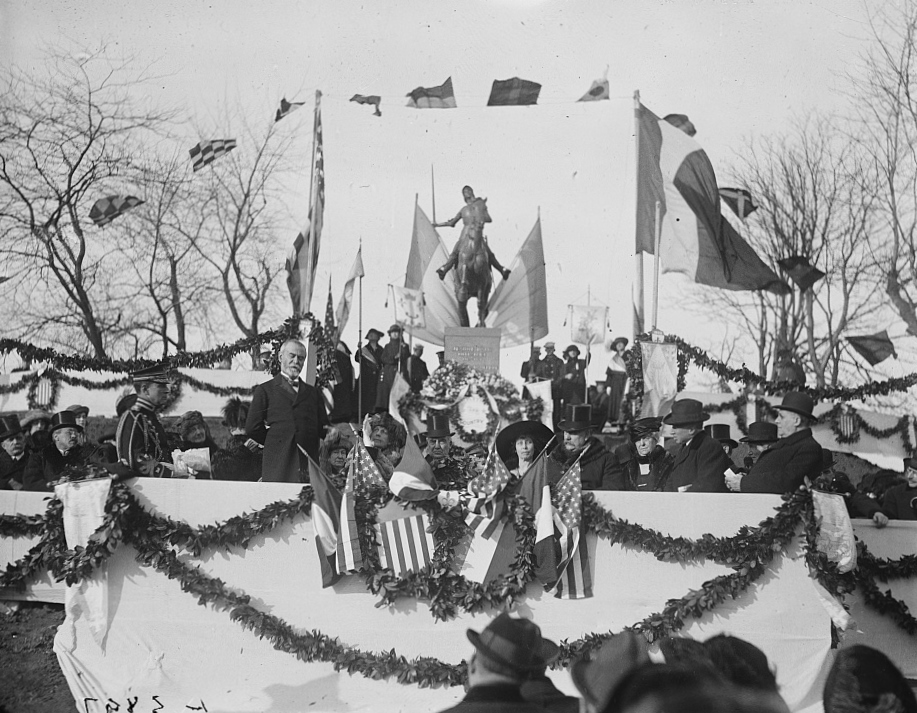
Dedication ceremony for the Joan of Arc statue in 1922

The second statue installed in the park was Joan of Arc, the only equestrian statue in Washington, D.C., depicting a woman. Joan of Arc was a French heroine and patron saint who successfully led troops during the siege of Orléans. She was later put on trial for heresy and burned at the stake around the age of nineteen. She became a national symbol of France beginning in the 1800s and was canonized by Pope Benedict XV in 1920. A proposal to install a statue of Joan of Arc was initiated in 1916 by Carlo Polifeme, president of the Society of Women of France of New York (Société des Femmes de France de New York). Several years later, a cast of the equestrian statue by artist Paul Dubois was completed. The base was designed by McKim, Mead & White. The statue was dedicated on January 6, 1922, a few weeks after the Dante Alighieri ceremony. Harding and his wife also attended the event, along with Secretary of War John W. Weeks, Daughters of the American Revolution president Anne Rogers Minor, numerous diplomats, and members of French American societies. The sword Joan of Arc holds has been stolen and replaced many times. The statue is located in the center of the grand terrace, overlooking the park's lower level.

Serenity, an allegorical sculpture by Spanish-Catalan artist Josep Clarà, was commissioned by American businessman and art dealer Charles Deering. He dedicated it to his lifelong friend, Lieutenant Commander William H. Schuetze, who traveled to Siberia to search for survivors of the ill-fated Jeannette expedition, and later served in the White Squadron and as a navigator on the USS Iowa during the Spanish–American War. Installation of the sculpture in Meridian Hill Park was completed in July 1925. Schuetze's name, carved into the granite base, is misspelled. Due to a long history of repeated damage inflicted upon Serenity, the sculpture has been described as the "most vandalized memorial" in Washington, D.C. The sculpture is located along a pathway in the northwest portion of the park and is partially obscured by trees.

The James Buchanan Memorial, which honors President James Buchanan, was in the original plans of the park. It was sculpted by German American artist Hans Schuler. Harriet Lane, Buchanan's niece who served as first lady during his presidential term since he was a bachelor, bequeathed $100,000 for a memorial to be erected in Washington, D.C., in honor of her uncle. Due to delays on preparing the park's lower level in the 1920s, the memorial was not dedicated until June 26, 1930. Attendees at the ceremony included President Herbert Hoover, Secretary of the Treasury Andrew Mellon, and Secretary of War Dwight F. Davis. Extending on each side of Buchanan's statue is a stone exedra. At each end of the exedra is a concrete sculpture, one representing Law and the other Democracy. It is located on the southeast corner of the park, near the reflecting pool.

The Noyes Armillary Sphere is an armillary sphere by artist C. Paul Jennewein. Funding for the sculpture was provided by artist Bertha Noyes, who donated $15,000 toward the project's cost in honor of her deceased sister, Edith. The design was inspired by Paul Manship's Cochran Armillary located on the campus of Phillips Academy in Massachusetts. It was installed in 1935, but work was not completed until the following year. A bronze calibration plaque, located on a cast iron post by the sphere, was later installed to correct errors with time precision. Decorative armillary spheres were added on top of the wrought-iron fence located on the north end of the park. Due to damage, the sphere was removed in 1973 and placed into storage for repairs. Some point after that it was either lost or stolen. Using original drawings and photographs of the sphere, Kreilick Conservation LLC created a replica, which was installed in 2024. It is located south of the reflecting pool.

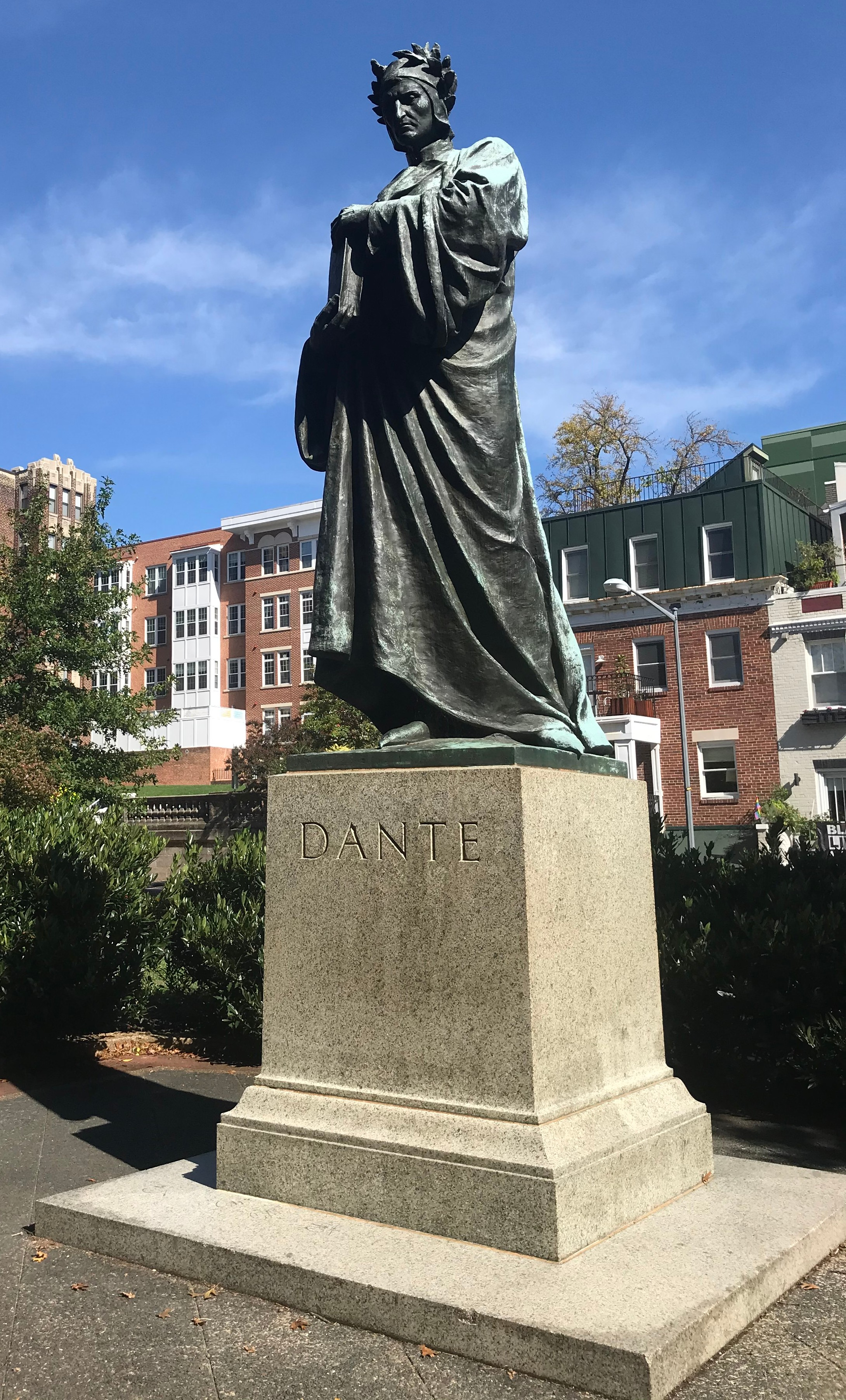
Dante Alighieri (1921)

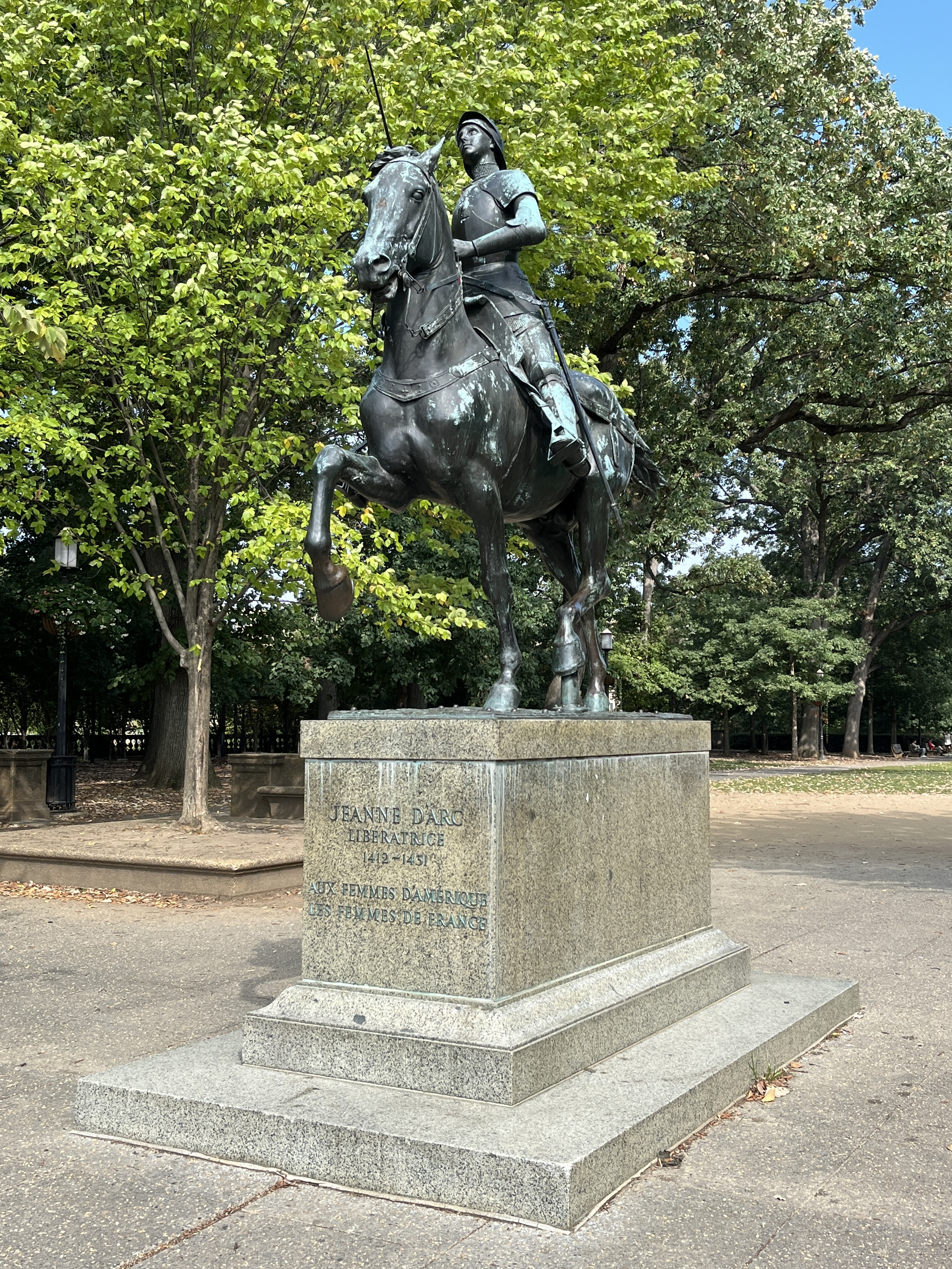
Joan of Arc (1922)

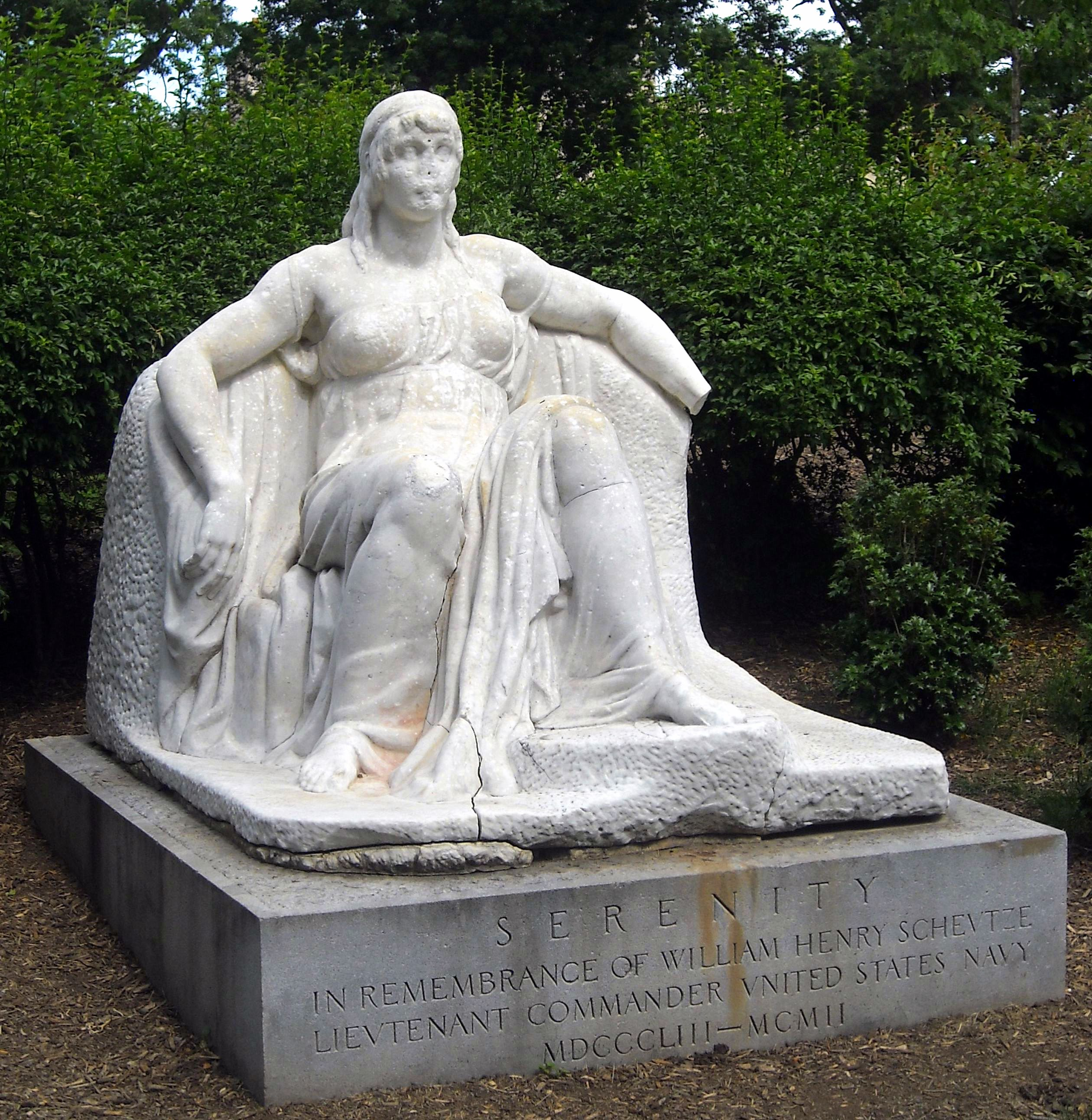
Serenity (1925)

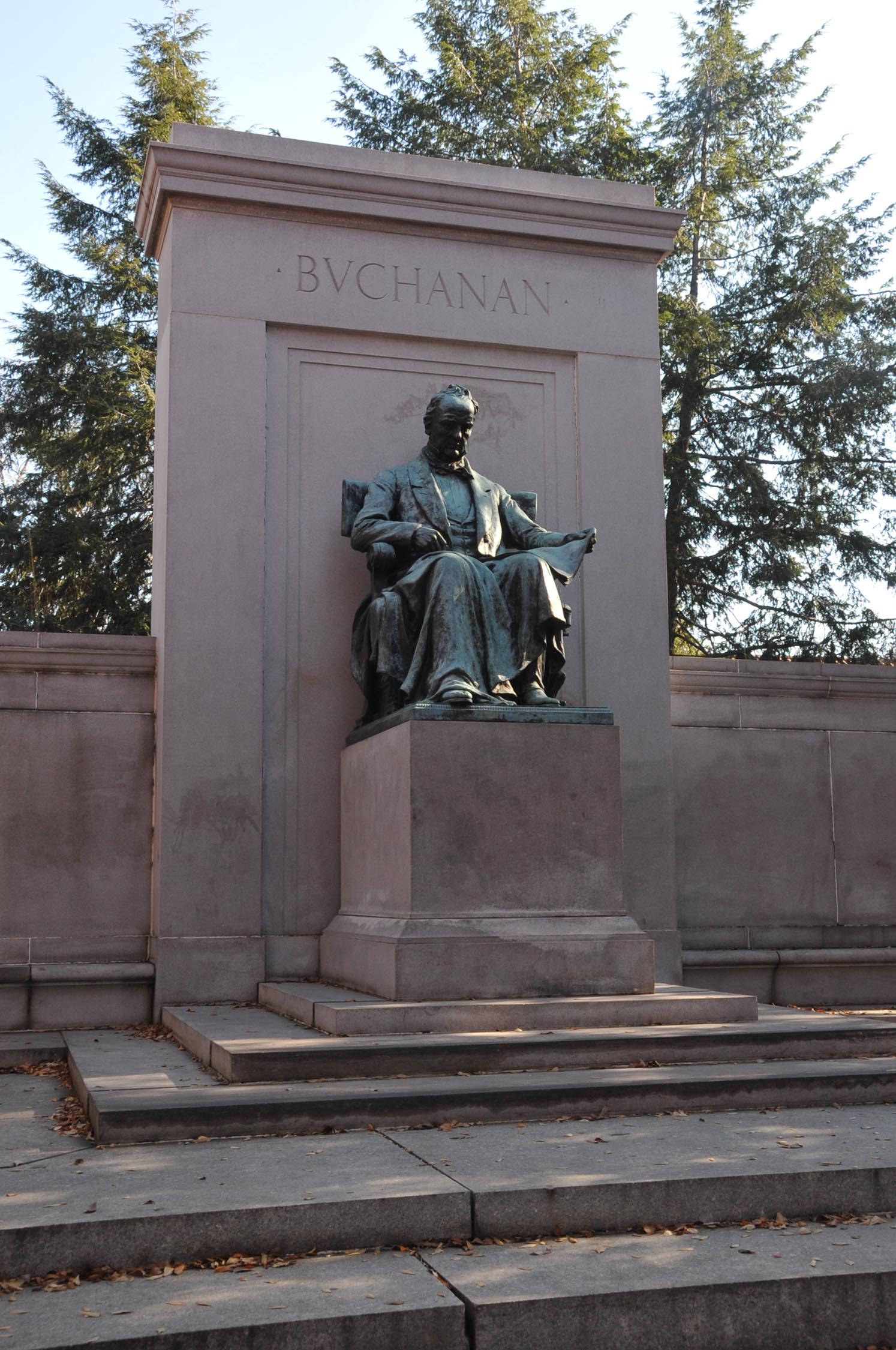
James Buchanan Memorial (1930)

Noyes Armillary Sphere (1936)

== Notes ==
1. The historic landmark designation form can be found at the bottom of the linked page in pdf format.

== See also ==
- List of National Historic Landmarks in Washington, D.C.
- National Register of Historic Places listings in the upper NW Quadrant of Washington, D.C.
