= Family Circle (House) =

Public artwork by Herbert House

- Artist: Herbert House
- Year: 1991
- Type: Steel
- Dimensions: 152.4 cm × 91.44 cm × 60.96 cm (60.0 in × 36.00 in × 24.00 in)
- Location: Washington, D.C.; 38°55′37.33″N 77°2′28.88″W
- Owner: DC Artworks

Family Circle is a public artwork by the American artist Herbert House, located at the intersection of 18th and Harvard Streets NW in the Adams Morgan neighborhood of Washington, D.C., United States. Family Circle was dedicated in 1991. It was surveyed as part of the Smithsonian's Save Outdoor Sculpture! survey in 1994.

== Description ==
Four nude figures of a male, female and two children dance in a circle. The figures are highly polished steel and have no facial features, feet or hands. House created the sculpture out of car bumpers that he cut and welded. The dancing figures are on top of a red circular tilted platform.

== Herbert House ==
Herbert House grew up in Washington, D.C. He graduated from Illinois State University and has been credited with creating over 500 works. House resides in Chicago, Illinois. His work is seen in the collections of Illinois State and numerous private collections.

== Condition ==
This sculpture was surveyed in 1994 for its condition, and it was described as "well maintained." In 2017, the sculpture was vandalized when two of the figures were torn off the platform. In 2018, the city hired House to repair the piece, and it went back on display.
