= Cascading Waterfall =

Public art work by John Joseph Earley

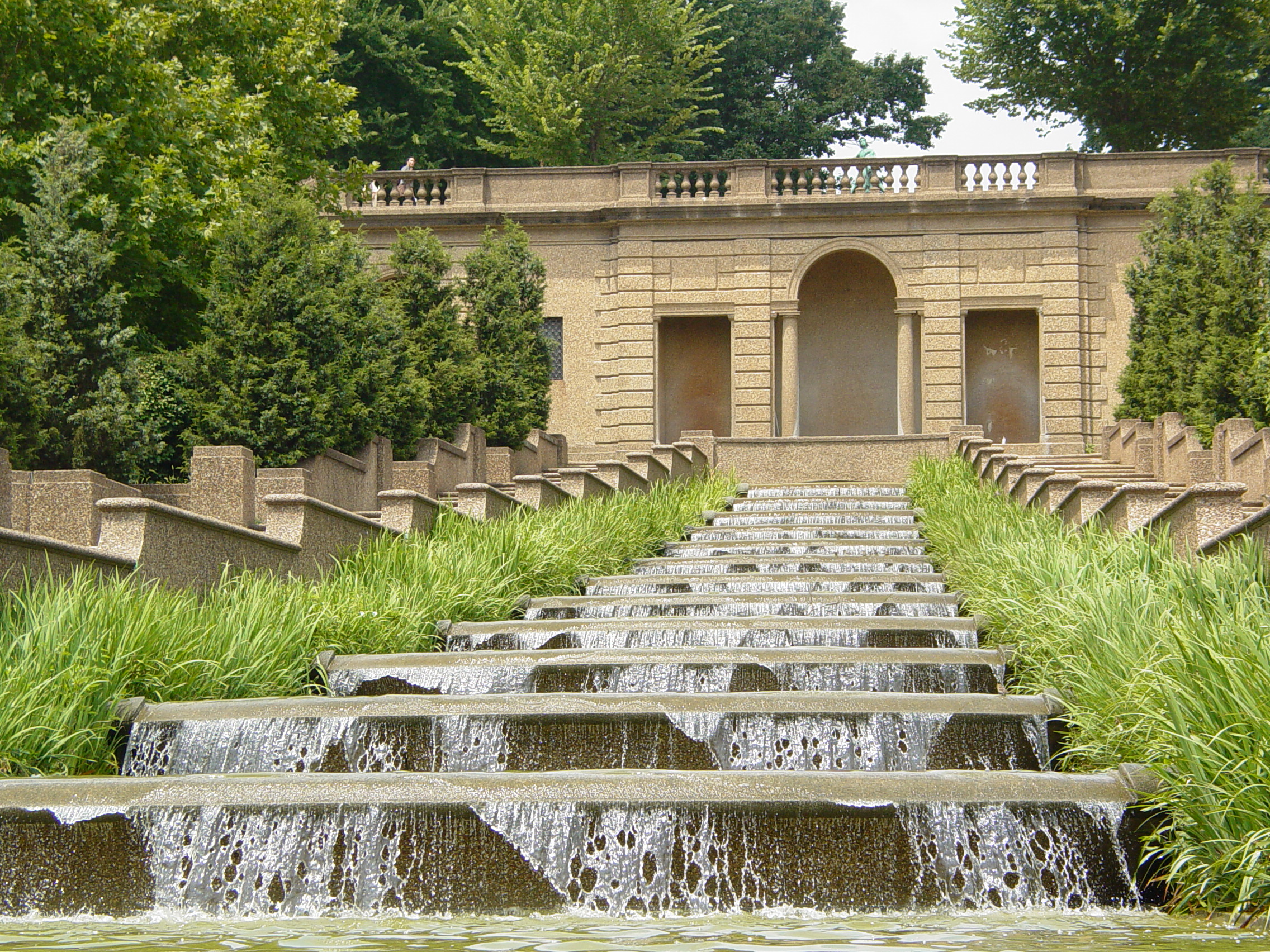
- Artist: John Joseph Earley
- Year: 1936
- Type: Concrete
- Dimensions: 9,100 cm (3600 in)
- Location: Washington, D.C.; 38°55′11.44″N 77°2′8.38″W
- Owner: National Park Service

Cascading Waterfall is a public art work by American artist John Joseph Earley, located in Meridian Hill Park, Washington, DC. The fountain, reminiscent of 16th century Italian villas, focuses primarily on thirteen large semi-circular basins forming a water cascade that overlooks the historic park. The fountains are the largest of its kind in the United States.

== Description ==
Primarily made of concrete, the water flows from two terrace fountains and reappears in "three columns of water and two shell spills in five niches which are located in the face of terrace retaining wall." After entering the niches, the water moves from two basins and two more spout overflows, and then into a series of thirteen graduated cascade basins that enter into large pools. The large pools feature four grotesque spouting masks, four urn jets, two dolphin sprays, and eight white water jets that help to refresh the water of the pool. The 16th Street side of the fountain has more niches and shell overflows and a recirculation room is in the control room under the great wall. Landscaping and walkways flank the fountain on both sides.

== Information ==
Water first flowed through the cascade in 1932. The walkways surrounding the waterfall features the first use of exposed aggregate concrete anywhere in the world. The waterfall is maintained by the National Park Service.

== Condition ==
The waterfall was surveyed in 1994 by Save Outdoor Sculpture and at the time treatment was needed. A broken pump caused the fountains to stop operating in 2016. In 2017, local residents living near the fountains created a community group to report to the National Park Service whenever the fountains were not operating. The following year, WAMU reported that the water supply piping had leaks. Contractors began to fix the piping, however, work stopped when they discovered that the pipe was cast iron. The National Park Service reported that they would replace 90 feet of piping to ensure the waterfall's continual operations. As of 2016, half of the funding to maintain Meridian Hill Park was used to maintain the fountains.

As part of a broader infrastructure renewal effort during the 250th year of independence celebration of the USA, the fountain was brought back to working condition.
