= List of public art in Washington, D.C., Ward 4 =

This is a list of public art in Ward 4 of Washington, D.C.

This list applies only to works of public art accessible in an outdoor public space. For example, this does not include artwork visible inside a museum.

Most of the works mentioned are sculptures. When this is not the case (i.e. sound installation, for example) it is stated next to the title.

Title	Artist	Year	Location/GPS Coordinates	Material	Dimensions	Owner	Image
Fort Stevens Monument and Marker	J. Otto Schweizer	1920	Fort Stevens	Metal & Stone	Relief: approx. 18 × 24 × 1/2 in.; Base: approx. 57 × 37 × 41 in.	Fort Stevens	
Faces Carved on Tree Trunks			Carter Barron Amphitheatre	Tree Trunk	Sculpture: approx. 8 ft. 3 in. × 5 ft. 7 in. × 7 ft.	United States Department of the Interior	
Major Walter Reed Memorial	Felix de Weldon	1966	Walter Reed Medical Center, Building 1	Bronze & Marble	Sculpture: approx. H. 4 ft.; Base: approx. H. 15 ft. Pylon: approx. H. 25 ft.	U.S. Army	
Penguin Fountain		1935	Walter Reed Medical Center	Concrete	Fountain: approx. H. 15 ft. W. 12 ft. Diam. 12 ft.; Basin: approx. H. 6 in. W. 50 ft. D. 3 ft. Diam. 50 ft.	U.S. Army	
Tigers	Alexander Phimister Proctor	1910	Piney Branch Bridge	Bronze, Concrete & Stone	4 tigers. Each: approx. H. 4 ft. D. 124 in.; Base: approx. 4 ft. 6 in. × 4 ft. 6 in. × 12 ft.	Department of Public Works	
Thompson-Harding Monument	Unknown	1898	Rock Creek Cemetery – Section E 38°56′50.47″N 77°0′39.77″W	Marble & Granite	Sculpture: approx. 156 × 90 × 90 in.; Base: approx. 90 × 90 × 90 in.	Rock Creek Cemetery	
Hubbard Bell Grossman Pillot Memorial	Unknown		Rock Creek Cemetery – Section A – Lot 13 38°56′51.58″N 77°0′40.2″W	Marble & Granite		Rock Creek Cemetery	
Force Memorial	Jacques Jouvenal	ca. 1868	Rock Creek Cemetery – Section B 38°56′55.67″N 77°0′40.7″W	Marble	16 ft h.	Rock Creek Cemetery	
Johnson Memorial	Unknown		Rock Creek Cemetery – Section L	Bronze & Granite		Rock Creek Cemetery	
Houser Memorial	Unknown		Rock Creek Cemetery – Section I	Granite		Rock Creek Cemetery	
Lenthall Monument	Unknown	ca. 1809	Rock Creek Cemetery	Sandstone		Rock Creek Cemetery	
Edwin B. Hay	Vinnie Ream	1906	Rock Creek Cemetery 38°56′56.03″N 77°0′33.36″W	Bronze	Sculpture: approx. 2 ft. 5 in. × 1 ft. 9 in. × 1 ft. 3 in.	Rock Creek Cemetery	
Kauffman Monument	William Ordway Partridge	ca. 1906	Rock Creek Cemetery – Section B	Bronze		Rock Creek Cemetery	
Gaff Memorial	Jules Déchin	1922	Rock Creek Cemetery – Section L, Lot 139	Bronze & Granite		Rock Creek Cemetery	
Hardon Monument	McMenamin	1893	Rock Creek Cemetery – Section I 38°56′54.84″N 77°0′34.98″W	Marble		Rock Creek Cemetery	
Sherwood Mausoleum Door		1928	Rock Creek Cemetery 38°56′48″N 77°0′47″W	Bronze	Door: approx. 80 × 40½ × 4 in.	Rock Creek Cemetery	
Frederick Keep Monument	James Earle Fraser	1920	Rock Creek Cemetery – Section A 38°56′48.63″N 77°0′42.32″W	Bronze, Granite	Sculpture: approx. 8 ft. × 5 in. 3 ft. 5 in. 1 ft. 8 in.; Base: approx. 10 ft. 5 in. × 8 ft. 11 in. × 5 ft.	Rock Creek Cemetery	
Hitt Memorial	Laura Gardin Fraser	1931	Rock Creek Cemetery	Bronze, Granite	Overall: approx. 62 × 134 × 28 in. Center plaque: approx. 38 × 15 in.; Left plaque: approx. 25 × 15 in.; Right plaque: approx. 25 × 15 in.	Rock Creek Cemetery	
Rabboni	Gutzon Borglum	1909	Rock Creek Cemetery 38°56′54.1″N 77°0′40.24″W	Bronze, Granite	Sculpture: approx. 75 × 37 × 37 in.; Base: approx. 88 × 74 × 16 in.	Rock Creek Cemetery	
Adams Memorial	Augustus Saint-Gaudens	1891	Rock Creek Cemetery – Section E 38°56′51″N 77°0′42″W	Bronze, Granite	Sculpture: approx. 5 ft. 10 in. × 3 ft. × 3 ft. 10 in.; Base: approx. 1 ft. 7 in. × 5 ft. × 3 ft. 10 in.	Rock Creek Cemetery	
Heurich Mausoleum	Louis Amateis	ca. 1895	Rock Creek Cemetery – Section 30 38°56′51″N 77°0′42″W	Bronze, Granite	Each Caryatid: approx. 8 ft. × 3 ft. 6 in. × 2 ft. 3 in.; Mausoleum: approx. 15 × 22 × 16 ft.	Rock Creek Cemetery	
The Reverend Godfrey Schilling	Frederick Charles Shrady	1955	Mount St. Sepulchre Franciscan Monastery	Bronze & Marble	Sculpture: approx. 8 × 2 × 2 ft.; Base: approx. 4 × 3 × 3 ft.	Mount St. Sepulchre Franciscan Monastery	
St. Michael	John Joseph Earley	ca. 1924	Mount St. Sepulchre Franciscan Monastery	Cast stone	Approx. H. 4½ ft. × W. 2 ft.	Mount St. Sepulchre Franciscan Monastery	
St. Christopher	John Joseph Earley	ca. 1924	Mount St. Sepulchre Franciscan Monastery	Cast stone	Sculpture: approx. 8 ft. × 40 in. × 40 in.; Base: approx. 6 ft. × 48 in. × 48 in.	Mount St. Sepulchre Franciscan Monastery	
St. Bernadette	Mary E. Lynch	1958	Mount St. Sepulchre Franciscan Monastery	Marble	Sculpture: approx. H. 4 ft. × W. 2 ft.; Base: approx. H. 6 in. × W. 2 ft.	Mount St. Sepulchre Franciscan Monastery	
St. Francis and the Turtle Doves	Porfirio Rosignoli	ca. 1924	Mount St. Sepulchre Franciscan Monastery	Bronze, Stone & Concrete	Sculpture: approx. 7 ft. × 40 in. × 40 in.; Base: approx. 6 ft. × 48 in. × 48 in.	Mount St. Sepulchre Franciscan Monastery	
St. Bernardine	John Joseph Earley	ca. 1924	Mount St. Sepulchre Franciscan Monastery	Cast stone	Approx. H. 4½ ft. × W. 2 ft.	Mount St. Sepulchre Franciscan Monastery	
Stations of the Cross			Mount St. Sepulchre Franciscan Monastery			Mount St. Sepulchre Franciscan Monastery	
Together We Live, Together We Rise	Jerome Meadows	2004	Elms Church Terrell Park 38°56′58″N 77°1′46″W				
