= Pieter Farde =

Flemish monk and slave (1651–1691)

Pieter Fardé (9 May 1651 – 16 June 1691) was a Flemish Franciscan brother who was enslaved and taken to the Agadez Sultanate on his way to Jerusalem.

Much of what is known about Fardé's life comes from a collection of letters, seven of which are attributed to him, detailing his enslavement, liberation, and difficult return journey. While it is generally agreed that Fardé was a historical figure, the authenticity of these letters has been a subject of debate since the 19th century, with some historians, including Jules Raes, questioning their veracity and comparing them to the fictional adventure novel Robinson Crusoe.

Despite these doubts, Fardé's narrative is believed to have inspired an 18th-century Franciscan mission to the region. This mission, led by two priests, ended tragically when both died from a plague in Katsina. His story has also influenced a number of Belgian literary works, including a 1926 novel by Filip De Pillecyn and a short biographical account published in a 1952 issue of Tintin magazine.

== Early life ==
Pieter Fardé was born on 9 May 1651 in Ghent. He was the fourth child of Jean Fardé and Joanna Cordonnier. The Fardé family was a successful merchant family of French origin who had settled in Ghent in the 1640s.

On 11 September 1671, Pieter formally joined the Reformed Franciscans and began his novitiate in Ghent. Some years later, he received a letter of commendation from the Franciscan Procurator General to the Belgian Provincial, thanking him for helping to put out a fire at the Jesuit house in Ghent. Pieter volunteered at a Franciscan mission in Jerusalem from 1682 to 1683. In April 1686, Pope Innocent XI issued a letter of encouragement to this mission, which likely influenced Pieter's decision to volunteer for a return journey to Jerusalem.

== Capture and Slavery ==
During his journey by sea, the ship Pieter boarded, despite being escorted by a warship, was ambushed by six Algerian pirate ships off the coast of Cape St. Vincent. The European ships narrowly escaped to São Miguel in the Azores, with Pieter sustaining only a leg wound. After the ship was repaired, it resumed its journey but met pirates again south of Crete. The ship was shelled and completely destroyed, forcing the passengers to jump into the water. The surviving passengers were captured by the pirates and taken to Annaba.

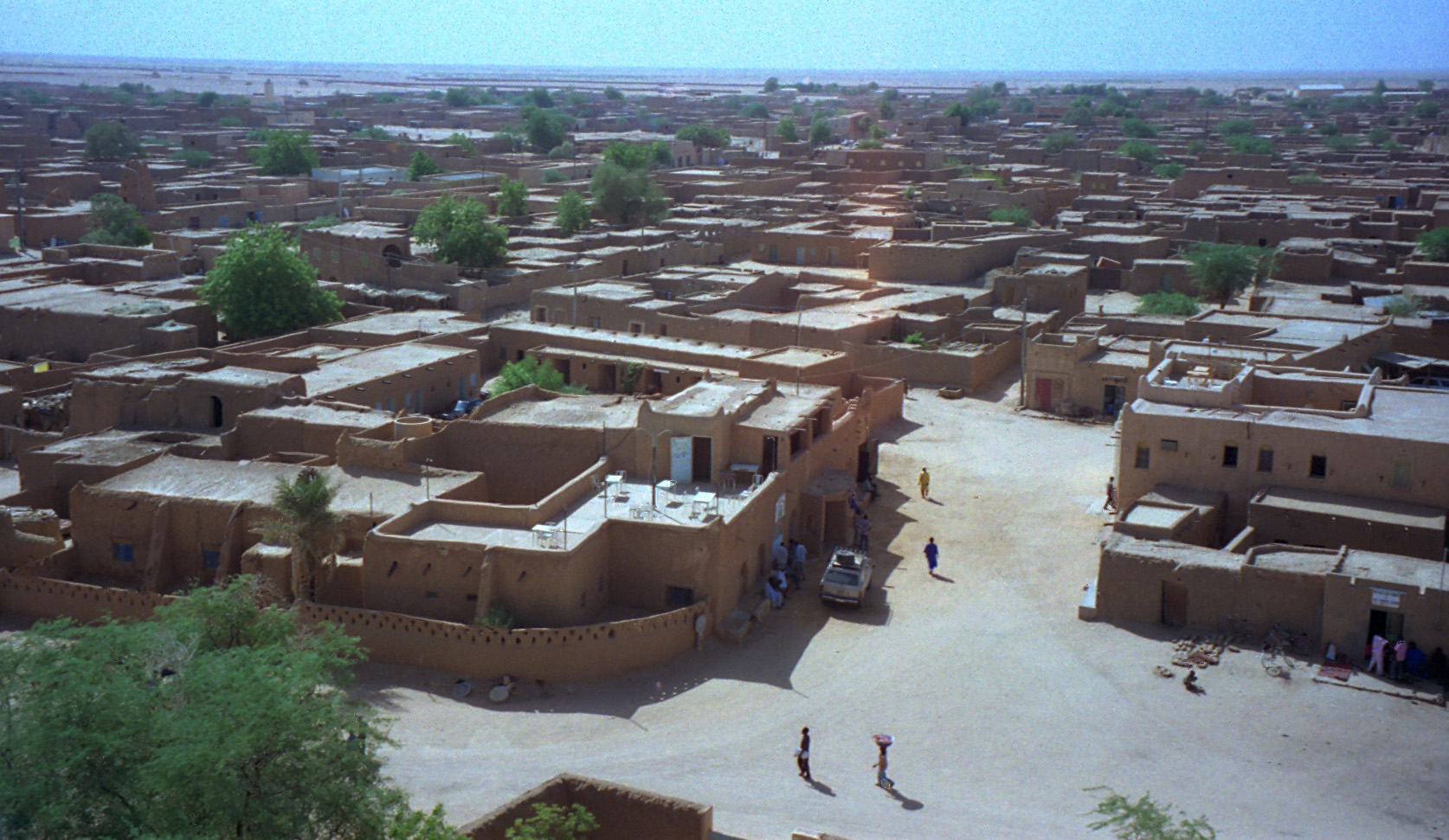
Agadez in 1997

Pieter and Daniel van Breuckel, another Franciscan passenger en route to Jerusalem, were sold as slaves to a 'Moor'. Their new master was a merchant named Sura Belin, who was returning to his home in Agadez from Persia. During their journey to Agadez through the Sahara Desert, Pieter learned that Sura Belin had been a slave for seven years in Livorno, where he had learned to speak Italian. They also conversed in Arabic, which Pieter knew a little of, and 'Moorish' (Note: Likely dialectical Arabic spoken in Algeria and the Sahara. He likely learnt it during his stay in Jerusalem.), in which he was fluent.

During one of their conversations, Sura Belin discovered that Pieter "knew something about architecture," which excited him, as he intended to build an Italian-style palace on the outskirts of Agadez. He promised Pieter his freedom or 200 rijksdaalders if he oversaw the construction of the palace. While on his knees, Pieter pleaded with Sura Belin to also free his brother, Daniel van Breuckel, upon the successful completion of the palace. Sura Belin agreed to the request and was reportedly deeply moved, stating that "he too had been a slave but had never experienced one slave interceding for another before he himself was free."

They arrived in Agadez on 14 December 1686, but construction did not begin until 2 February 1687. Pieter oversaw the workers, who included 'Moorish', Jewish, and Christian slaves. According to Daniel van Breuckel, Pieter used the opportunity to proselytise:

"Speaking as plainly as he could, he said that no salvation can be had except through Jesus Christ crucified, and in the true Catholic and Apostolic Church. To the Jews he proved that Christ is the true Messiah promised by God to Abraham and his descendants. He demonstrated this to them mostly from the prophets, from Moses to Malachi. He also showed that the New Testament, written by the four Evangelists and the Apostles, testifies to us that in our Lord and Saviour Jesus Christ all has been accomplished which the prophets foretold about him, from his birth until his ascension and the sending of the Holy Spirit."

In about a month of proselytising, Pieter managed to convert over two hundred "Jews as well as Moors" to Christianity. Among them was his master, Sura Belin, whom he reportedly baptised in secret. However, one of the workers, a French Huguenot named Louis de la Place, strongly opposed Pieter's preaching. Together with some Jewish workers, he reported Pieter to the city's judges (qadis), accusing him of "leading the people to the Roman, papish, idolatrous church." According to Daniel van Breuckel, they had to convert to Islam "in order to confirm their accusation." As a result, Pieter was arrested and brought before the judges. He openly admitted to the charges, "affirming again that there is no salvation outside the Catholic, Apostolic, and Roman Church, and that by the merits of Jesus Christ crucified." After receiving a hundred strokes on the soles of his feet, Pieter was imprisoned. When he refused to recant his teachings, he endured further punishment. Daniel van Breuckel described what he witnessed:

"...they put him naked on a moveable scafold about 5 feet high, 6 wide and 8 long, on which stood a kind of gallows. At either angle of this they bound him by his hands, and on his feet they hung a weight of some 150 pounds. In this way he was transported through the streets of the town. Two men, one in front and one behind, flogged him all the time with whips so terribly that when they arrived back at the court he looked as if he were being taken out of a bath of blood. They had maltreated him from the shoulders to the soles of his feet. Nothing remained undamaged except his head and arms, which were too high for those who flogged him. When he was untied he fell down flat in his blood, crying incessantly: 'Jesus, my Saviour'"

Pieter's master, Sura Belin, was informed that he had to pay 400 abokelpen (Note: According to Daniel van Breuckel, this is equivalent to 300 rijksdaalders.) to secure Pieter's release otherwise he would be executed. Sura Belin managed to negotiate the price down to 200, under the condition that once the palace construction was completed, Pieter would leave the kingdom and cease all religious discussions under penalty of being burned, with Sura Belin facing exile. After Pieter's release from prison, Sura Belin took care of him. The severe floggings had left Pieter's body so stiff that he could not walk, and his skin appeared "more like the bark of a tree than the skin of a man." The French Huguenot, who had previously accused Pieter, was placed in charge of all the slaves in Agadez and was assigned the role of supervising Pieter. Once Pieter had recovered from his injuries, he was moved to a small cellar beneath the street to live. The French Huguenot held the key to the cellar and was responsible for letting Pieter out in the morning and locking him back inside at night. According to Pieter, the Frenchman subjected him to constant abuse:

"Every day he gives me two pounds of bread which he throws at me like a dog. He does not address me like a human being but like a beast, with angry and spiteful words; the least he says is 'maudit papist', that is, 'damned papist'. He looks at me with cruel eyes and cannot stand me at all, because it is not enough in his estimation for him to have been appointed my guard by the judges and to have power over me in everything. For he still may not beat me, because my master asked and obtained this restriction from the judges, and therefore he seems to burst with resentment..."

As the construction neared completion, Pieter began planning for his redemption. Daniel van Breuckel, had died on 15 August 1687, as he was unable to endure the harsh labor. Pieter wrote to his Franciscan brothers in Europe, requesting financial assistance to pay for his freedom and settle the debts he owed his master. He asked them to deposit 200 rijksdaalders into the account of Bartholomeus Colck, a warship captain in Amsterdam. Colck's brother, a merchant based in St. George d'Elmina who traded in Agadez, had met Pieter and promised to send the funds to him once the money was deposited.

== Return to Europe ==
=== Journey through Hausaland ===
Colck received the money, and Pieter was freed in early 1688. For his journey back to Europe, Pieter considered traveling through the port at St. George d'Elmina, although he anticipated delays as there were no ships expected to leave soon. He also considered taking the route through the Sahara. However, Sura Belin strongly advised against traveling through North Africa due to the heightened anti-European sentiments at the time, fueled by recent Ottoman defeats during the Great Turkish War. Moroccans, in particular, were angered by the loss of the important coastal city of Oran to the Spanish. Following Sura Belin's advice, Pieter decided to travel to St. George d'Elmina and wait there for a ship to Europe.

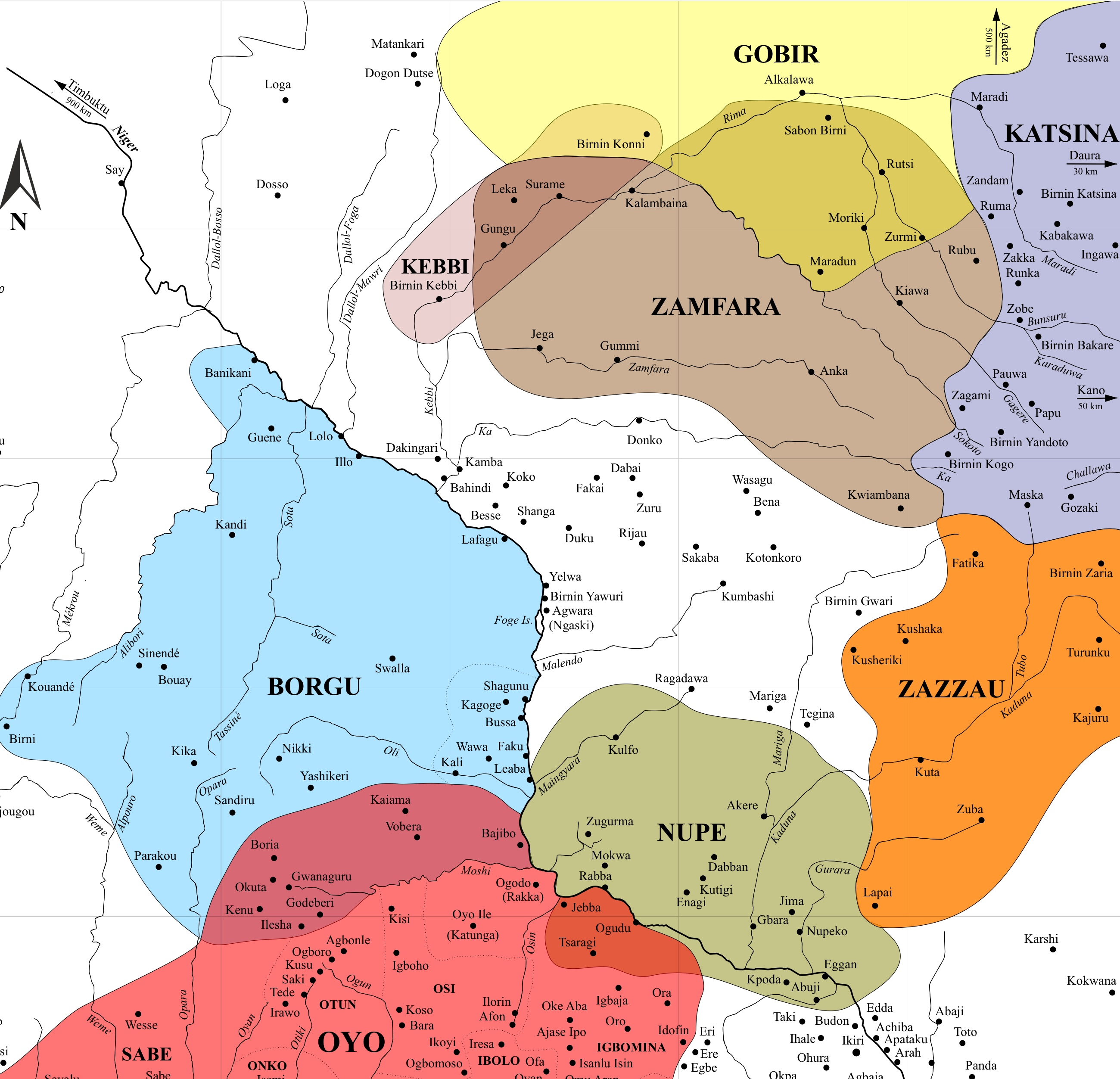
Western Hausaland in the 18th-century

After staying a few more months, Pieter left Agadez on 10 July 1688, en route to St. George d'Elmina. Sura Belin provided him with two guides to help him cross the Niger River south of Agadez. However, once they reached Gobir, the guides left Pieter and returned to Agadez, leaving him to continue the journey alone. Pieter travelled through the dense, unpopulated forest that separated Katsina to the east from Zamfara and Kebbi to the west. To avoid the hyenas that roamed the forest, he traveled only during the day and rested in trees at night for safety. After four days of travel, he finally came across a beaten path running east to west, a trade route leading towards the important commercial city of Kano to the east. Pieter followed this path for three days before encountering four locals. Realising he was a stranger to the land, they robbed him of all his supplies. After taking his belongings, one of them seized Pieter's axe and attempted to strike him with it. However, the other three intervened and allowed him to leave.

=== Journey to Congo ===
Pieter continued his journey without food or water, sleeping in high trees at night to avoid wild animals. On the third day without food, he came across a tree "with fruits like wild figs, but they were not that." Desperate from starvation, he ate some of the fruit. Shortly after, he began to "feel such cramps and great pain in my stomach as if I had taken poison." Writhing in pain, he lay under the tree for hours, unable to move. Just before sunset, a large caravan passed by. The caravan, consisting of about 200 camels and 50 elephants, was returning to the Congo from Hausaland. The caravan's leader took pity on Pieter and ordered that he be placed atop one of the elephants to rest. Pieter was fed and nursed back to health by the caravan members. After a week of rest, he had recovered fully and joined the caravan on foot. The caravan leader frequently spoke to Pieter about 'Brachmanni' and always pointed to the east during their conversations. Pieter guessed that he was originally from India and a follower of Brahmanism.

After about two months of traveling, the caravan arrived at its destination, the Kingdom of Congo. Pieter stayed with the caravan leader at his home for two weeks before continuing his journey to Luanda, where he found a ship preparing to sail to St. George d'Elmina. Three days into the voyage, on 29 December 1688, the ship was capsized by a storm. Pieter survived by clinging to floating planks and drifted alone at sea for three days until he reached a small rocky reef. For eleven months, Pieter survived on the reef by collecting rainwater in a crevice and eating fish trapped in the rocky pools by the receding tide.

=== Rescue and death ===
On 25 May 1689, a Dutch ship passed by Pieter's reef but did not stop due to bad weather and fear of hitting it. After another 179 days, on 20 November 1689, Pieter was rescued by pirates en route to Salé in Morocco. To compensate them for his passage, Pieter agreed to work under bond in Salé. The ship arrived on 20 December 1689, and Pieter began working there. He sent a letter home informing his family of his situation. On 9 April 1690, a Dutch ship delivered a letter to Pieter authorising him to borrow ransom money from the captain. With this assistance, Pieter secured his freedom and eventually reached Ghent in early January 1691.

Upon his return to Europe, Pieter was appointed Commissary for the Holy Land and assigned to the Franciscan house in Aachen. He died there from a fever on 16 June 1691.
