= Franciscan Monastery of the Holy Land in America =

Historic Franciscan monastery in Washington, D.C.

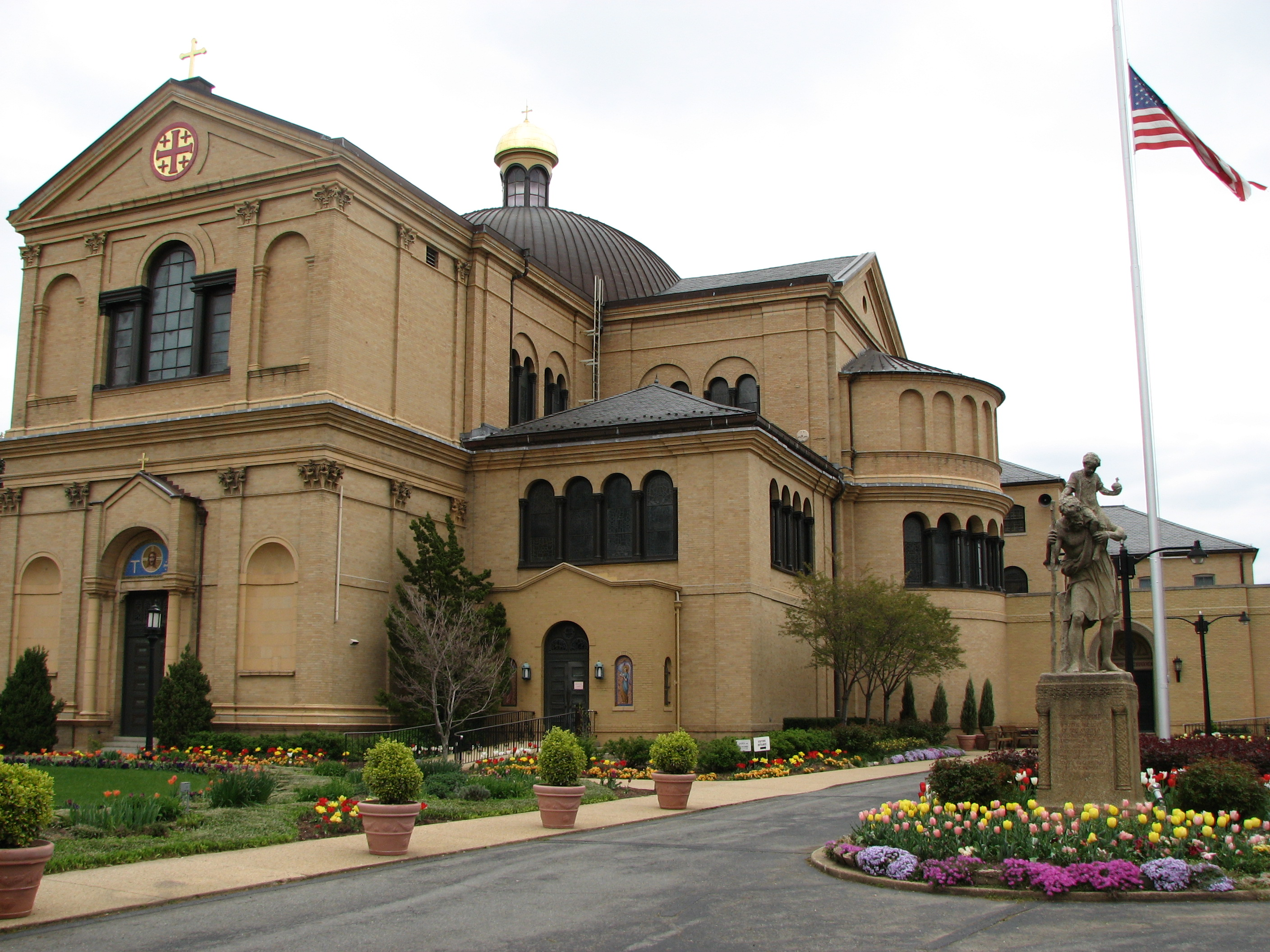
- Franciscan Monastery of the Holy Land in America (2006)

Religion
- Affiliation: Roman Catholic
- Diocese: Archdiocese of Washington
- Ecclesiastical or organisational status: Friary/Monastery

Location
- Location: 1400 Quincy St. N.E. Washington, D.C., United States
- Interactive map of Franciscan Monastery of the Holy Land in America
- Coordinates: 38.9375°N 76.9853°W

Architecture
- Architect: Aristide Leonori
- Type: Friary
- Style: Neo-Byzantine
- Groundbreaking: 1898; 128 years ago
- Completed: 1899; 127 years ago

U.S. National Register of Historic Places
- Added to NRHP: 17 January 1992
- Franciscan Monastery and Memorial Church of the Holy Land
- U.S. National Register of Historic Places
- Location within District of Columbia Location within the United States
- Coordinates: 38°56′15″N 76°59′7.1″W
- Area: 44 acres (18 ha)
- NRHP reference No.: 91001943

Website
- www.myfranciscan.org

The Franciscan Monastery of the Holy Land in America is a Franciscan complex (Note: "...The site is actually a friary, a home for friars, not a monastery, which suggests it is a home for monks. In the Catholic Church, monks are tied to the particular location to which they are assigned, whereas friars are free to move from location to location. The name 'monastery' is still used, both because of tradition and because it’s a landmark and it would be too difficult to change it to 'friary'.") at 14th and Quincy Streets in the Brookland neighborhood of Northeast Washington, D.C. Located on a hill called Mount Saint Sepulcher, and anchored by the Memorial Church of the Holy Sepulcher, it includes gardens, replicas of various shrines throughout the Holy Land, a replica of the catacombs in Rome, an archive, a library, as well as bones of Saint Benignus of Armagh, brought from the Roman catacombs and originally in the cathedral of Narni, Italy.

== History ==
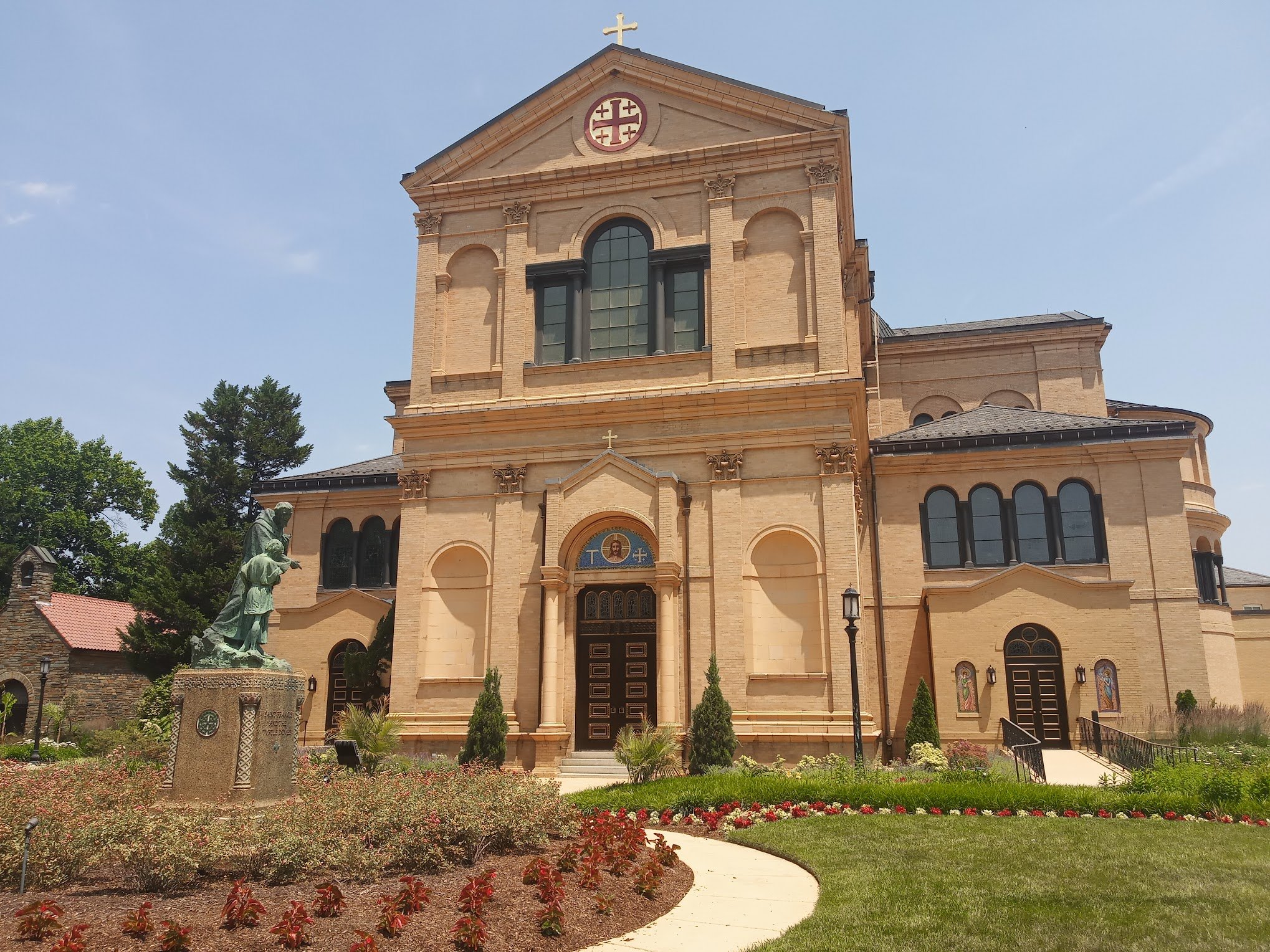
Facade of the Memorial Church

The Very Reverend Charles A. Vassani (1831–1896) established the U.S. Commissariat of the Holy Land in 1880, in New York City. It was from this location that Rev. Vassani and Father Godfrey Schilling, O.F.M. (1855–1934) began to plan to build a "Holy Land in America" and a Holy Sepulcher. They envisioned building on a high hill on Staten Island, overlooking the entrance to New York's harbor. These plans were later dropped. Eventually the plans changed to a wooded hilltop in Brookland, Washington, D.C. In 1897, Fr. Godfrey purchased the McCeeney Estate in Brookland in order to found a monastery and church.

The six Brothers lived in the abandoned McCeeney house. After purchasing the site, Fr. Schilling visited the Holy Land and took measurements and photographs of the Holy Sites. In February 1898, ground was broken, and the cornerstone was laid on the Saint Joseph's Day.

Construction of the holy shrines, gardens, and Rosary Portico continued for several years. The Church was consecrated in September 1924, on the twenty-fifth anniversary of its dedication.

In January 1992, the "Franciscan Monastery and Memorial Church of the Holy Land" was listed on the National Register of Historic Places.

In 2022, the Archdiocese set the site as the sole designated location for Sunday celebration the Tridentine Mass within the city of Washington.

== Architecture ==
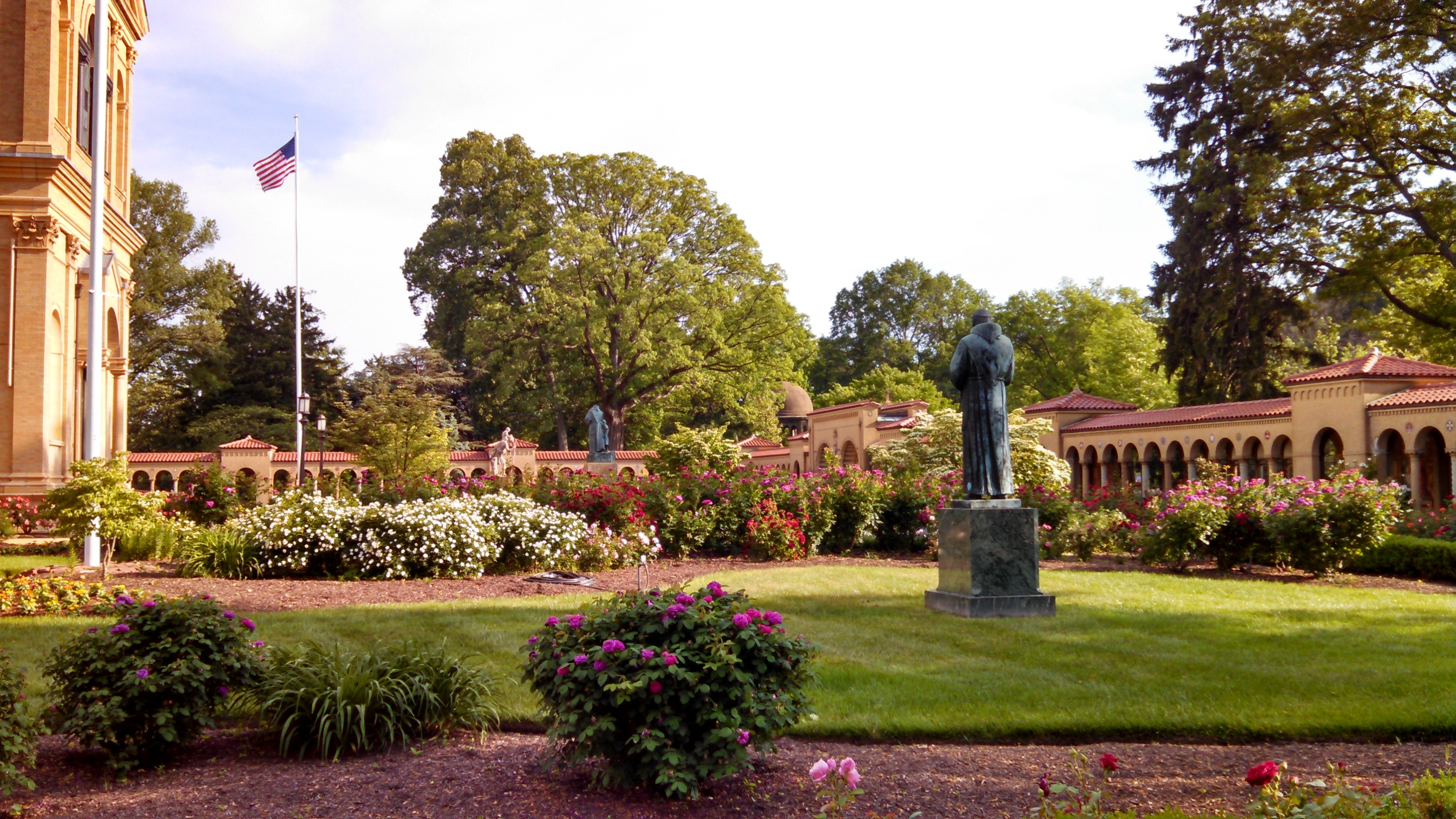
Gardens of the Franciscan Monastery of the Holy Land in America in the Brookland neighborhood of Washington, DC

The Memorial Church of the Holy Sepulcher was designed by the architect Aristide Leonori. The cornerstone was laid in 1898 and construction completed in 1899. The church's design alludes to the Church of the Holy Sepulchre in Jerusalem. Its floor plan loosely resembles the fivefold Jerusalem cross. It was also built in the neo-Byzantine style, resembling Hagia Sophia in Constantinople. (Note: "It is built along the architectural lines of Hagia Sophia in Istanbul.") Some Romanesque influences were added to the design.

The Rosary Portico designed by John Joseph Earley surrounds the church. It contains fifteen chapels depicting the mysteries of the Rosary. Each chapel contains plaques bearing the Hail Mary in nearly two hundred ancient and modern languages. The Rosary Portico resembles the Cloister of St. John Lateran in Rome and Saint Paul's Outside the Walls. Various Christian symbols from the catacombs decorate the facade.

Attached to the Church is the neo-Romanesque Monastery. The Monastery grounds contain replicas of shrines in the Holy Land, a Lourdes grotto, and a replica of the Porziuncola.

Many artists and architects have contributed to the development of the site.

== Library and Archives ==
The Library and Archives contain various materials on the Holy Land and the early development of the monastery, monastery life and a large collection of vestments.

== Music ==
=== Organ ===
A Lively-Fulcher organ was installed in 2003 which replaced the Henry Pilcher Sons Opus 1481. There are monthly recitals.
