= Aristide Leonori =

Italian architect and engineer

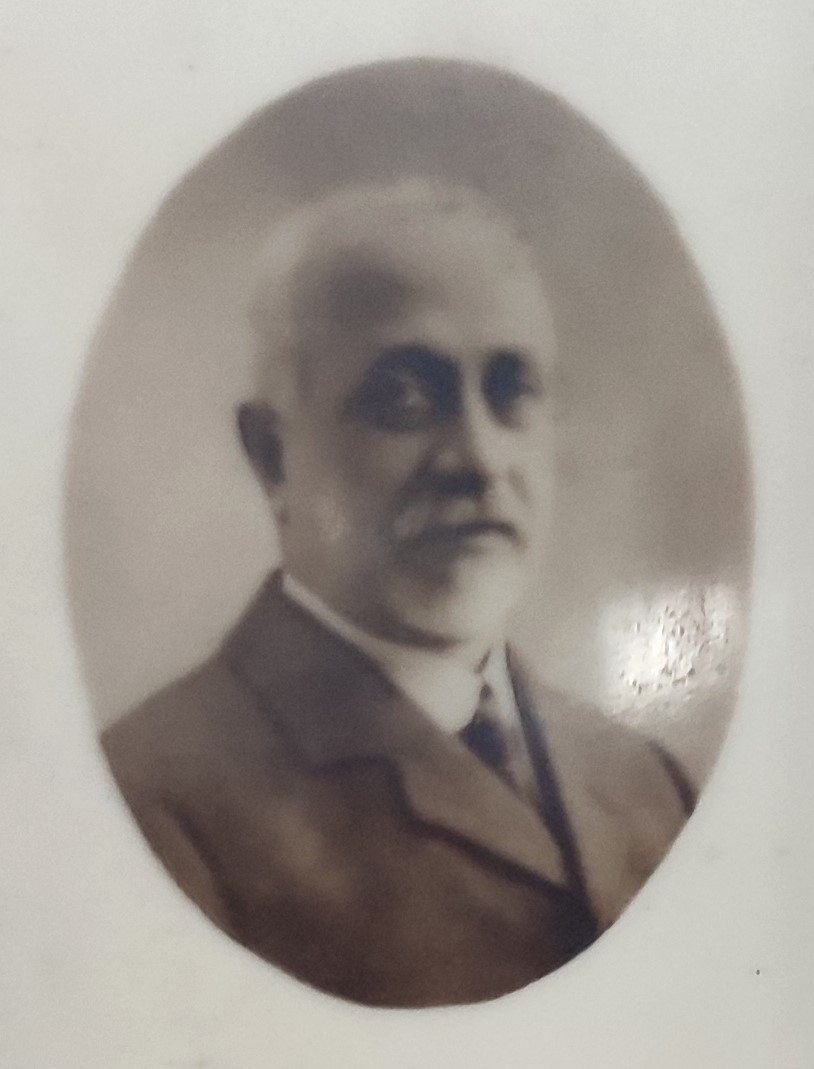
- Born: July 28, 1856; Rome, Italy
- Died: July 30, 1928 (aged 72)
- Occupation: Architect

Aristide Leonori (28 July 1856 – 30 July 1928) was an Italian architect and engineer. He worked mostly on religious buildings in Italy, the United States, and Africa. He had a variety of styles in which he worked.

== Biography ==
Born in Rome, the eldest of twelve children of Rafael and Anna Ianari Leonori, After graduating from high school, he attended architecture courses at the Accademia di San Luca, studying under Virginio Vespignani. Vespignani involved him in work on a new apse at the Archbasilica of Saint John Lateran (1882-86).

Leonori set up his own studio in 1884. He mainly worked in building churches and religious structures, adopting styles and characters requested by the client. Many of his commissions came from religious institutes. In 1886 he became a Franciscan tertiary, and with two others founded a night shelter for abandoned children.

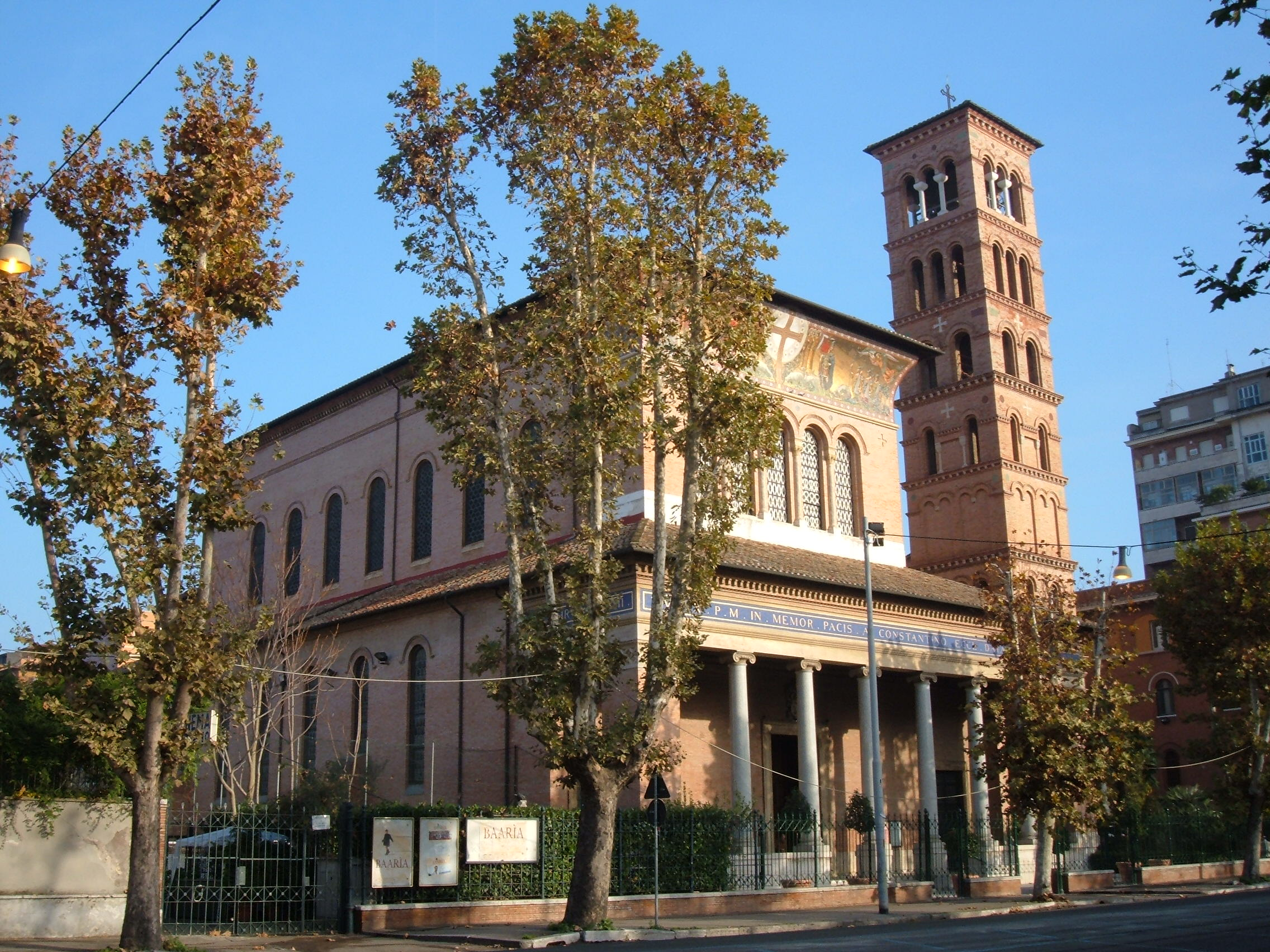
Santa Croce in Via Flaminia, Rome

From 1890 onwards, he was architect of the chapter of Santa Maria in Trastevere, directing a series of restorations in the basilica until 1923. In the 1890s he began a series of overseas travels from which a number of assignments developed. He often collaborated on design with his younger brother Pio in Rome, and later with his nephew Francisco.

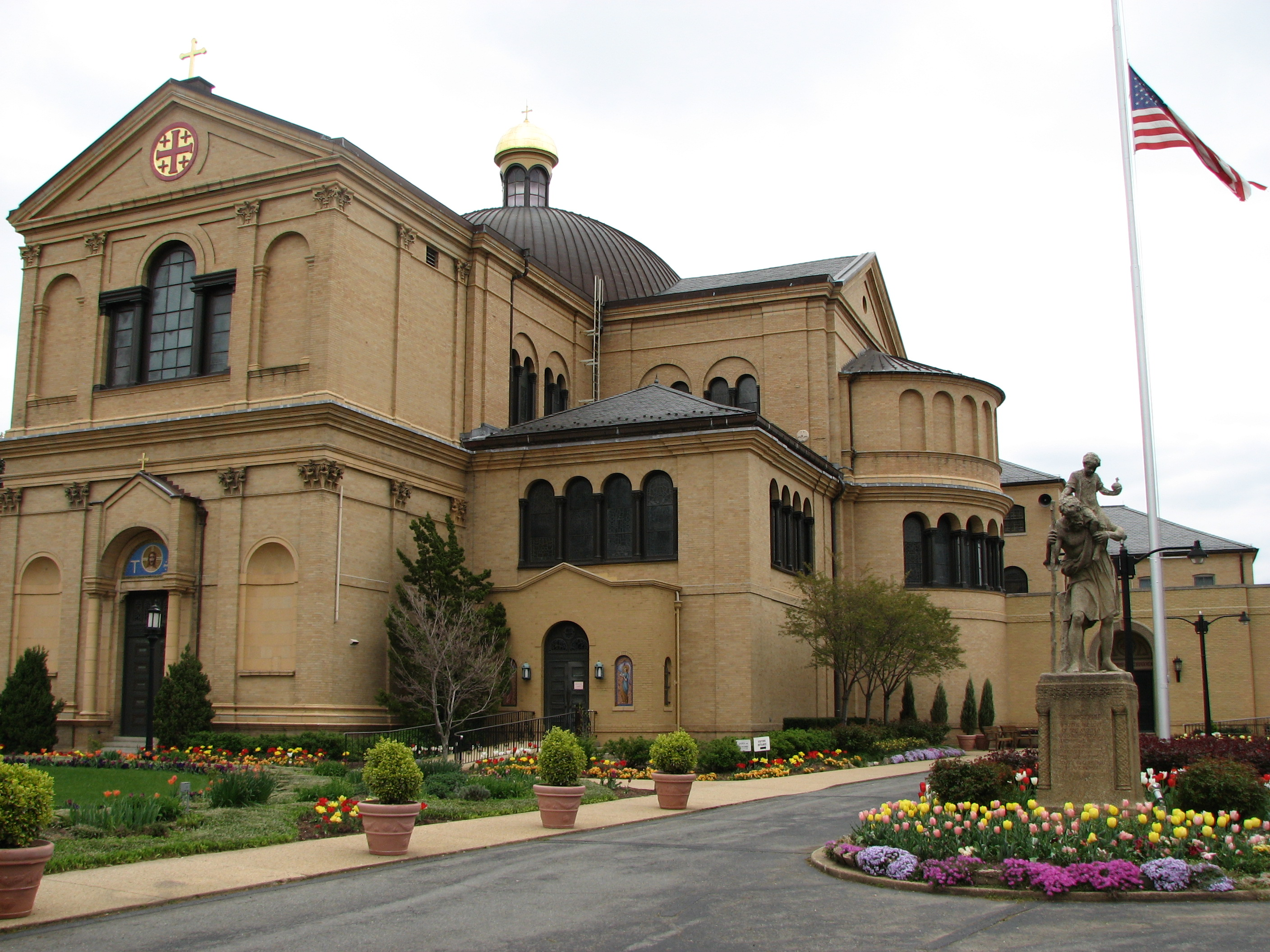
Franciscan complex, Washington DC

Leonori also worked in Egypt, Mauritania, Ireland, Prague, Warsaw, and elsewhere. One of his biggest projects was the design and construction of the Church of St. Joseph in Cairo, Egypt, built in 1909. He often provided his services free of charge for projects for religious complexes in India, Africa and South America. In Rome, Leonori designed at least five churches and several hospitals. He helped design the belltower for the Shrine of the Virgin of the Rosary of Pompei (1912) in Pompeii, Italy. In addition to designing The Franciscan Monastery of the Holy Land in Washington, D.C., Leonori contributed to several other churches in the United States: the Cathedral Basilica of St. Louis (1907); and Holy Rosary Church in Washington, D.C. (1923).

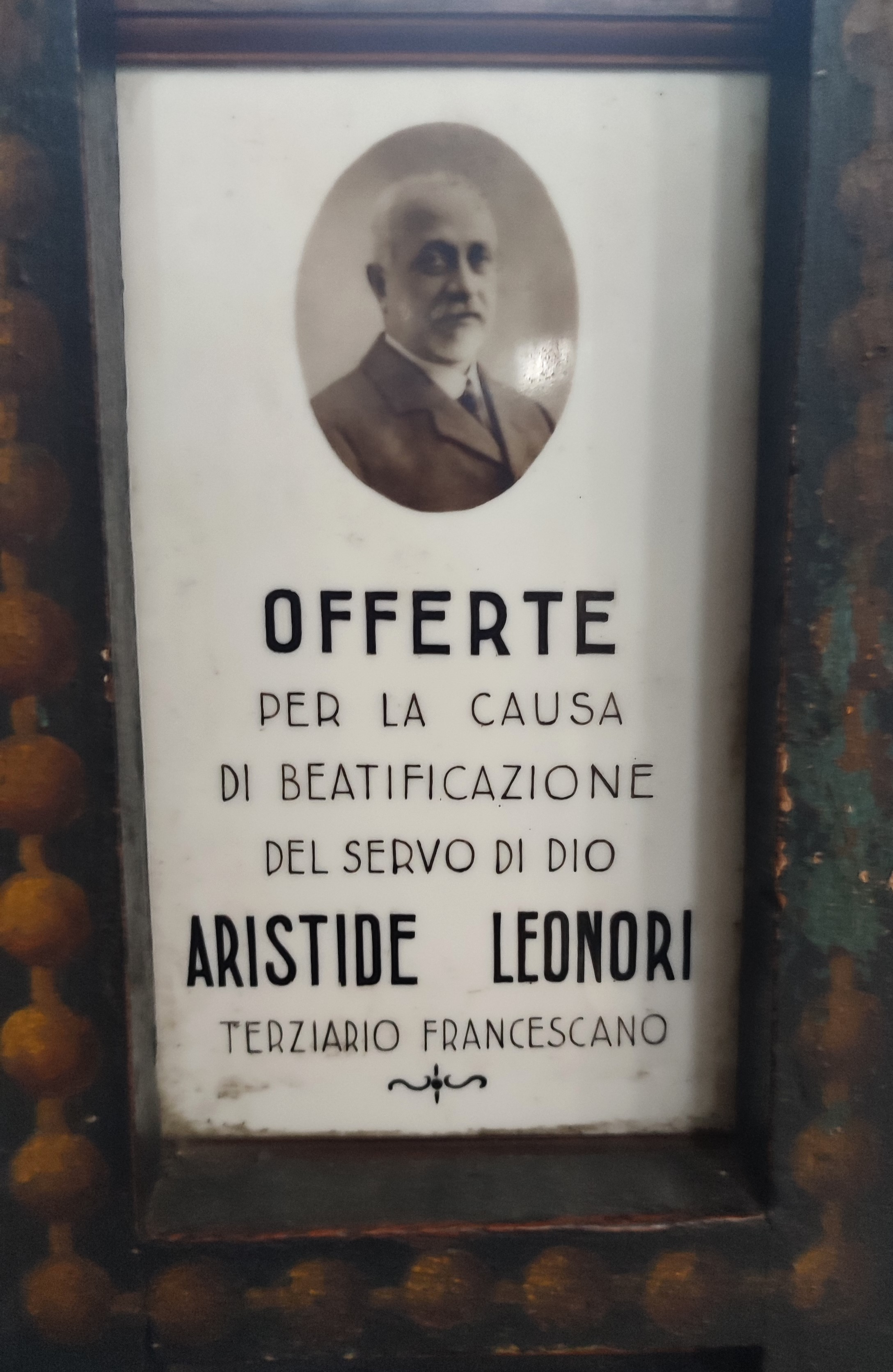
Memorial in the Basilica Santa Maria in Aracoeli (Rome)

Between 1898 and 1913, he published in Rome a twice-monthly magazine in Latin titled Vox Urbis: de litteris et bonis artibus commentarius. He also wrote:

- The Italian industries at the National Exhibition in Milan in 1881…, Rome (1882)
- Leo XIII and the arts, Rome (1888)
- The most distinguished cathedrals of the thirteenth century, Rome (1891)

Leonori was a member of various Catholic associations. In 1886, he was made a knight of the Order of St. Gregory the Great; and in 1912, of the Order of St. Sylvester. He died in Rome in 1928.

Leonori was declared a Servant of God by the Catholic Church.

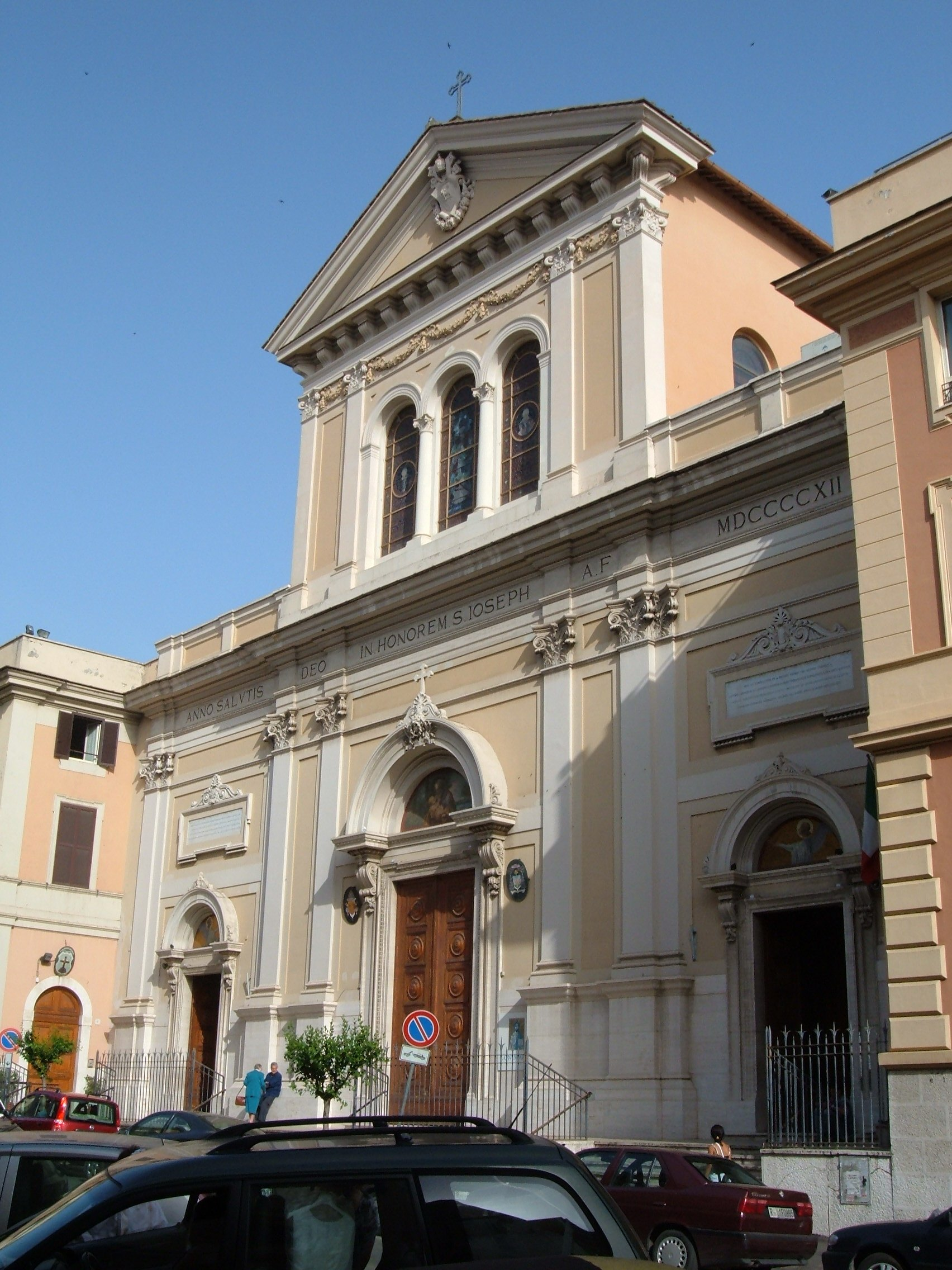
San Giuseppe al Trionfale

== Works (partial) ==
- Franciscan Monastery of the Holy Land in America, Washington D.C. (1898)
- Chapel of Our Lady of the Sacred Heart in Sant'Andrea della Valle in Rome. (1887)
- San Patrizio, Rome (1908)
- San Giuseppe al Trionfale, Rome (1909)
- St. Joseph Cathedral, Buffalo, New York) (1912); demolished.
- two chapels in the Cathedral of Saint Louis, St. Louis, Missouri (1912-14)
- Shrine of the Virgin of the Rosary of Pompei, Pompei (1912) bell tower
- Santa Croce in Via Flaminia, Rome (1913)
