= John J. Earley Office and Studio =

Historic house in Washington, D.C., United States

- U.S. National Register of Historic Places
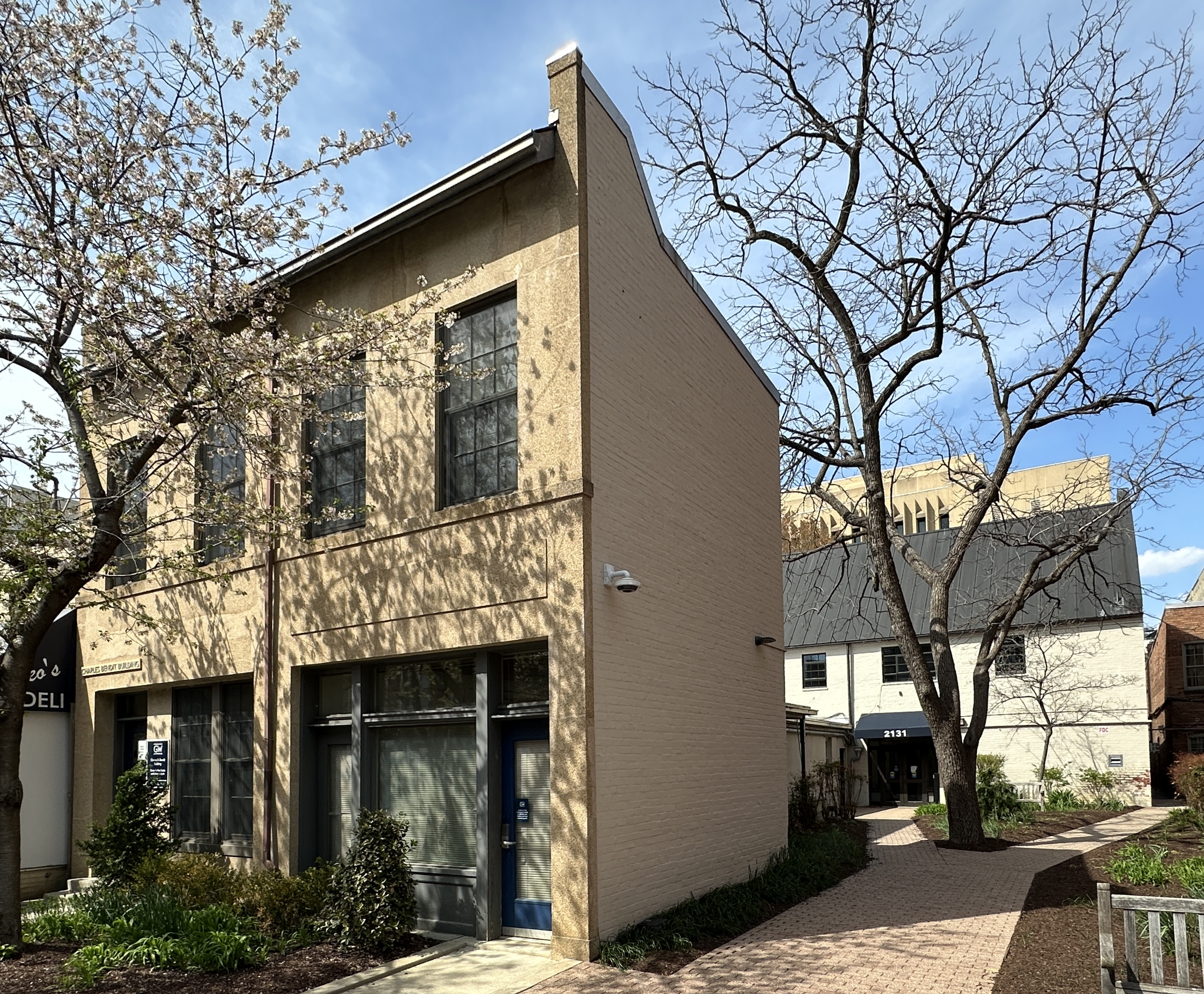
- John J. Earley Office (foreground) and Studio (background) in 2026

- Location within Central Washington, D.C. Location within the District of Columbia Location within the United States
- Location: 2131 G Street, N.W. Washington, D.C.
- Coordinates: 38°53′55″N 77°2′53″W
- Built: 1907
- Architect: John Joseph Earley
- Architectural style: Federal
- NRHP reference No.: 10000367
- Added to NRHP: June 18, 2010

John J. Earley Office and Studio is a historic home at 2131 G Street, Northwest, Washington, D.C., in the Foggy Bottom neighborhood.

== History ==
It was the home and studio of John Joseph Earley, an architect and sculptor, from 1907 to 1936. It was at this studio where he experimented with plaster and stucco, and then developed the exposed aggregate concrete that he called "architectural concrete". This construction technique, also known as Polychrome, or Earley concrete, may be seen in many buildings, Polychrome Historic District, the Fountain of Time, Parthenon (Nashville), and in Meridian Hill Park.

He renovated the interior in 1911. In 1921, he covered the façade with his architectural concrete. He moved out after losing permission to build a crushing plant at this location. On his deathbed, he sold the Earley Studio to Basil Taylor for a dollar. The Taylor family continued to use the studio until 1973.

The George Washington University acquired the property, and uses it as offices and as a dance studio. It is a part of the Historic Preservation Plan, by George Washington University, adopted by the D.C. Historic Preservation Review Board.
