= San Giuseppe al Trionfale =

- Basilica of Saint Joseph on the Triumphal Way
- Basilica Parocchiale San Giuseppe al Trionfale
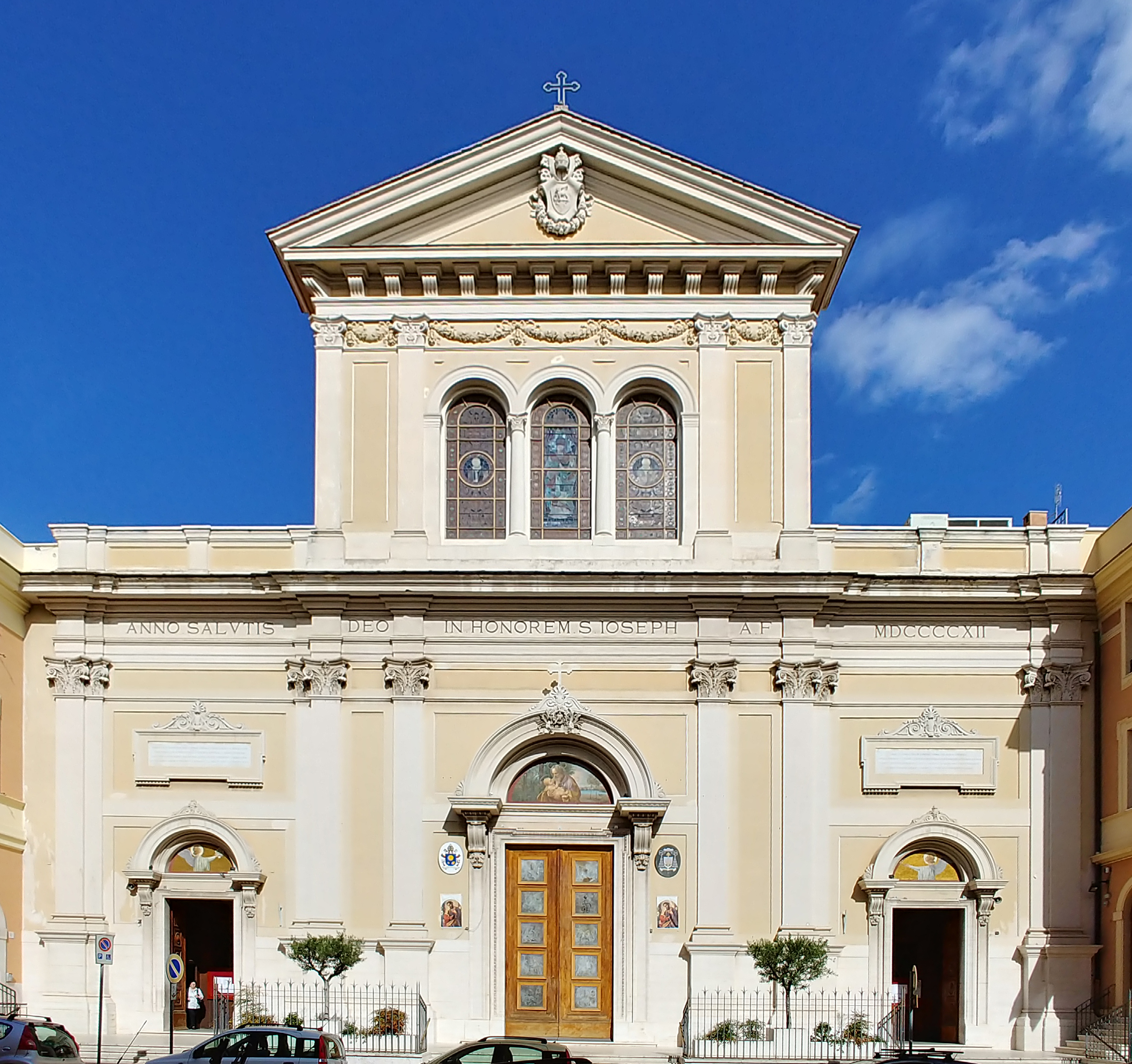
- Façade. The bronze doors were modified in 2013.
- Click on the map for a fullscreen view
- 41°54′42″N 12°27′06″E
- Location: Via Bernardino Telesio 4/B, Trionfale, Rome
- Country: Italy
- Language: Italian
- Denomination: Catholic
- Tradition: Roman Rite
- Religious order: Servants of Charity

History
- Status: titular church, parish church, minor basilica
- Founder: Luigi Guanella
- Dedication: Saint Joseph
- Consecrated: 19 March 1912

Architecture
- Functional status: active
- Architect: Aristide Leonori
- Architectural type: Neoclassical
- Groundbreaking: 1909
- Completed: 1912

Administration
- Diocese: Rome

San Giuseppe al Trionfale is a 20th-century minor basilica and titular church in Rome, located immediately north of the Vatican, dedicated to Saint Joseph.

== History ==
San Giuseppe in Via Trionfale was built in 1909–12, designed in Neoclassical style by Aristide Leonori. It was the project of Luigi Guanella, founder of the Servants of Charity.

On 7 June 1967, it was made a titular church to be held by a cardinal-deacon. In 1970 it was made a minor basilica.

Cardinal-Deacons

- Egidio Vagnozzi (1967–1980); promoted to cardinal-priest in 1973
- Giuseppe Casoria (1983–2001); promoted to cardinal-priest in 1993
- Severino Poletto (2001–2022); created a cardinal-priest in 2001
- Emil Paul Tscherrig (2023–2026); created a cardinal-deacon in 2023

== Structure ==
The basilica has a central nave with side aisles with nine bays. The façade is rendered in peach, with architectural details in white, and dado in limestone.

The interior is in a Baroque style, with Corinthian columns in pinkish-grey Baveno granite with gilded capitals. Stained glass windows depict Pope Pius IX, Pope Pius X and Pope Benedict XV. Mosaics in the apse were added in 1964 to designs by Pio and Silvio Eroli, with scenes from the life of Saint Joseph. The spandrel of the triumphal arch shows Christ in majesty with scenes featuring the four patriarchs Abraham, Isaac, Jacob and Joseph, son of Jacob. Silvio Consadori added twelve frescos in 1971.
