= Thompson-Harding Monument =

Artwork at Rock Creek Cemetery, Washington, DC

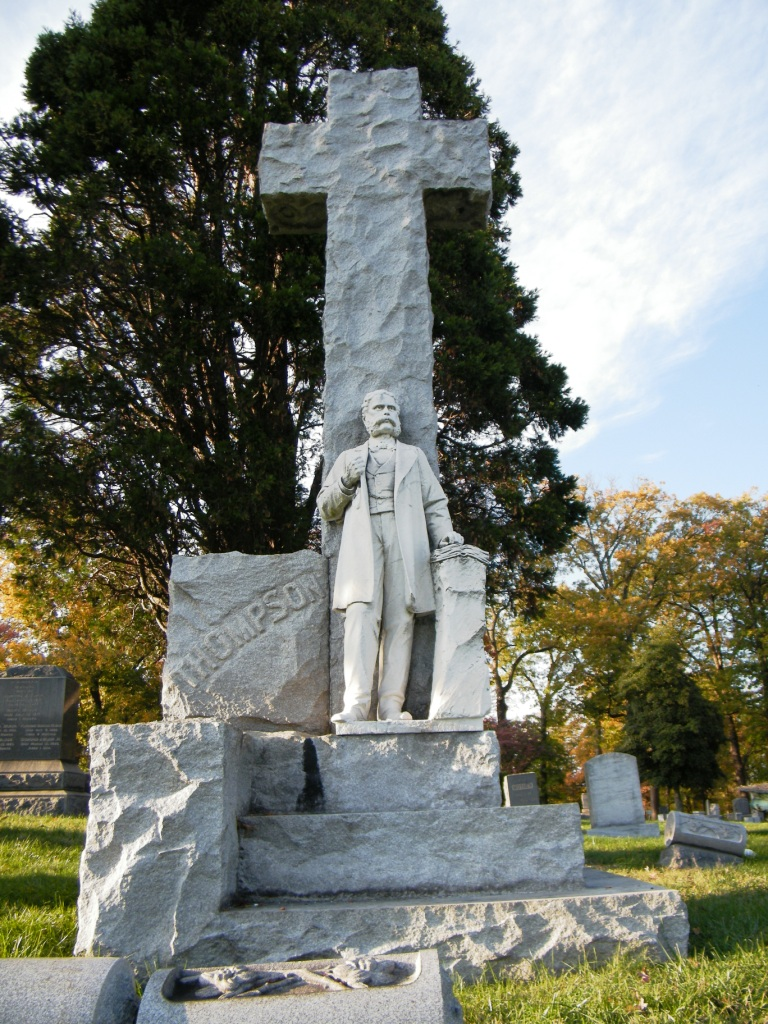
- Artist: Unknown
- Year: 1898
- Type: Marble & Granite
- Dimensions: 400 cm × 230 cm × 230 cm (156 in × 90 in × 90 in)
- Location: Washington, D.C., United States; 38°56′50.47″N 77°0′39.77″W
- Owner: Rock Creek Cemetery

Thompson-Harding Monument is a public artwork by an unknown artist, located at Rock Creek Cemetery in Washington, D.C., United States. The monument was originally surveyed as part of the Smithsonian's Save Outdoor Sculpture! survey in 1993.

== Description ==
This two sided sculpture's focal point is a large granite cross placed upon three granite steps. On the north side of the cross stands a full-size portrait of N. Elbridge Thompson and on the opposite side is a full-size portrait of Lillie May Harding. Thompson wears a suit with a long jacket, vest and bow tie. He has sideburns, a mustache and a beard. Harding wears a long dress with intricate carvings of lace on the borders. She has long hair which lies over her proper right shoulder and in her proper left hand she holds a lily.

The north side of the monument is engraved: THOMPSON The south side of the monument is engraved: HARDING

The west side of the base is engraved:

ERECTED BY ELLEN J. THOMPSON
AND S. ELIZABETH HARDING

== Gallery ==
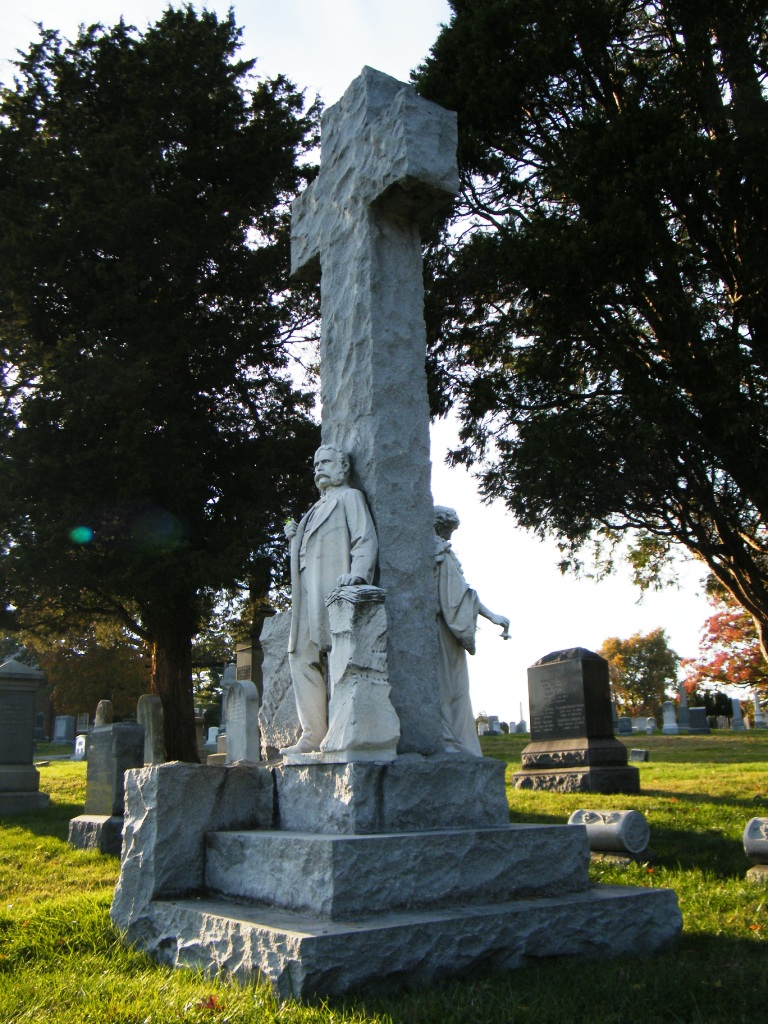
North Proper Right

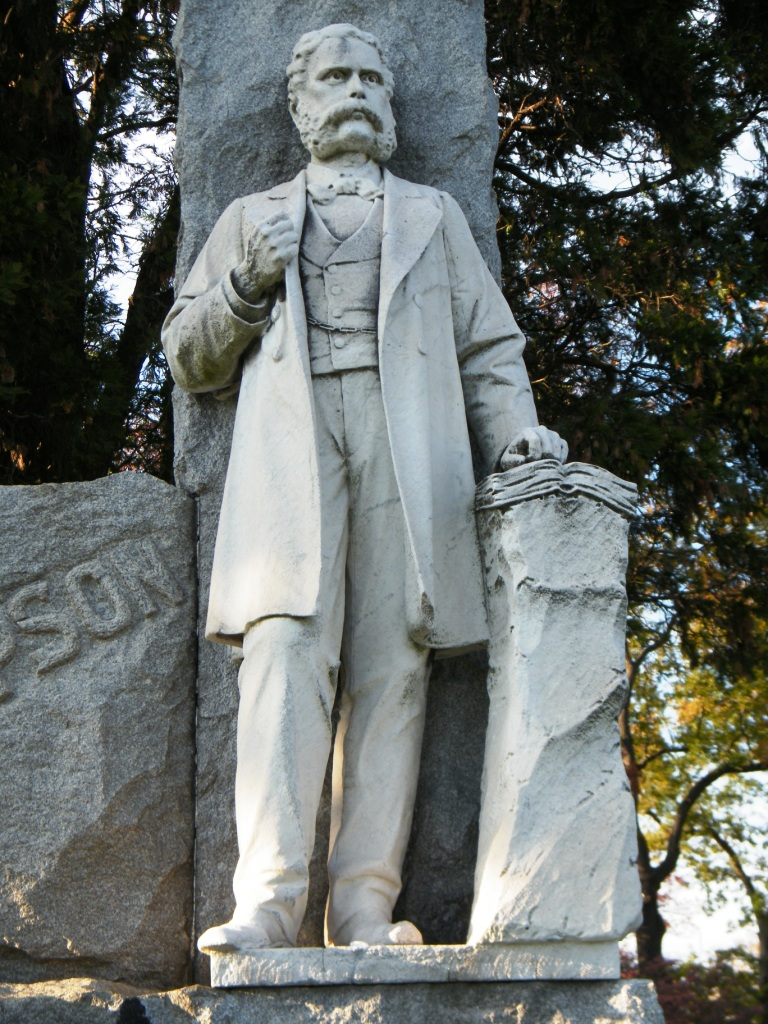
North Detail

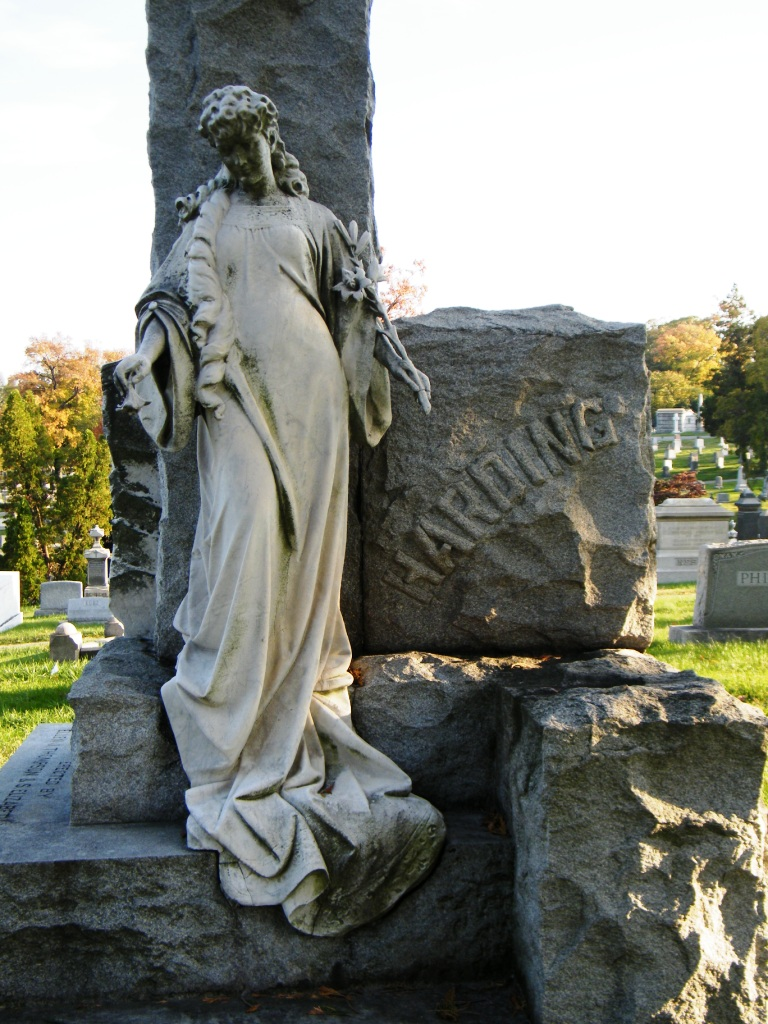
North

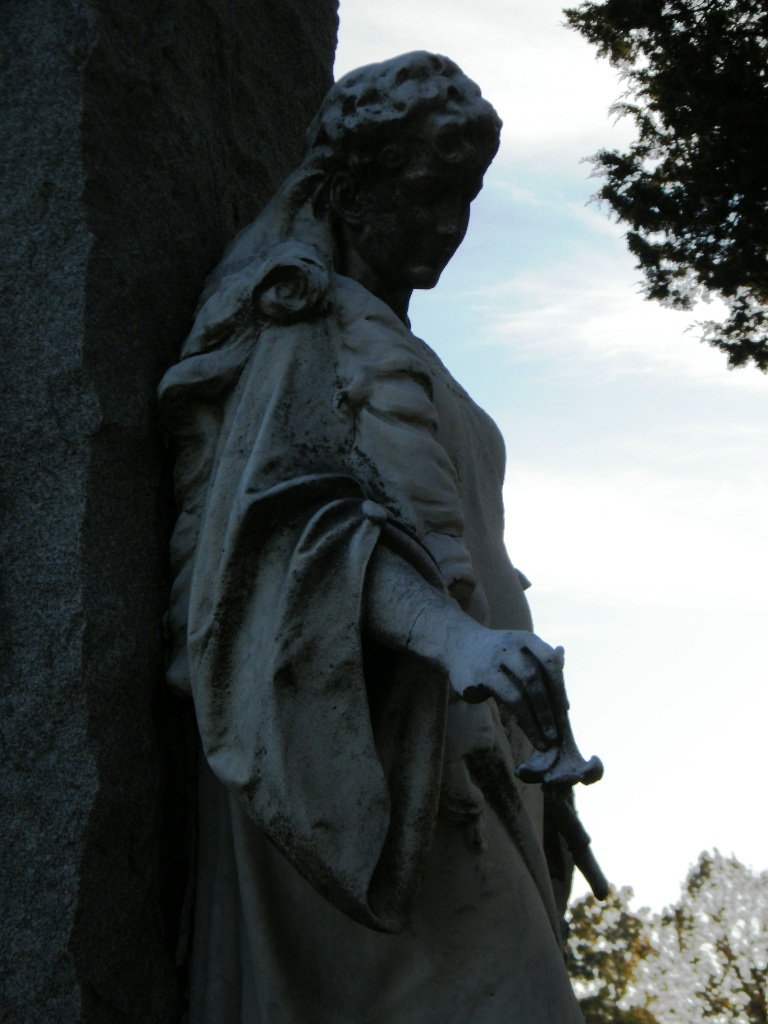
North Proper Right

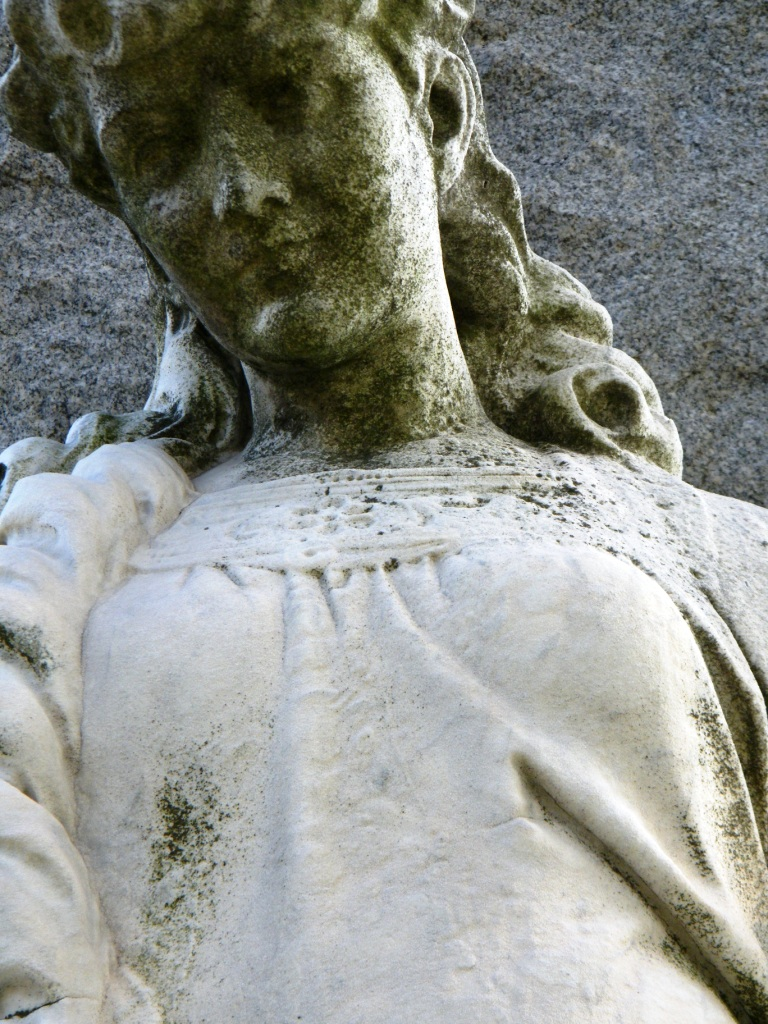
North Detail

== Information ==
This monument was erected by members of both families. Lillie May Harding died in 1897 at the age of twenty-seven.

The Washington Post described the monument in 1977 as follows: "a rugged cross, an angel in the act of dropping a stone flower, and a statue of a portly gentleman trying hard to look celestial in a coat and tails."

== Condition ==
This sculpture was surveyed in 1993 for its condition and it was described as needing treatment.
