= Gaff Memorial =

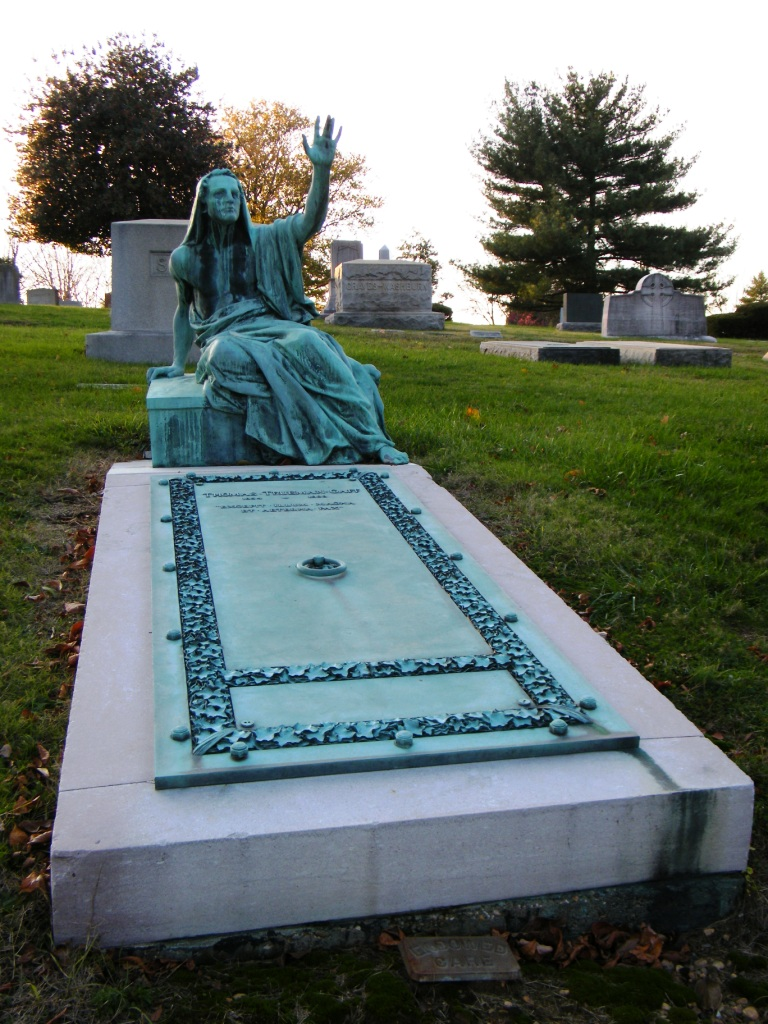
- Sculpture in 2010
- Artist: Jules Déchin
- Year: 1922
- Type: Bronze
- Location: Washington, D.C.; 38°56′52.95″N 77°0′34.02″W
- Owner: Rock Creek Cemetery

Gaff Memorial is a public artwork by French artist Jules Déchin, located at Rock Creek Cemetery in Washington, D.C., United States. Gaff Memorial was originally surveyed as part of the Smithsonian's Inventories of American Painting and Sculpture. This memorial serves as the burial site of Thomas Trueman Gaff.

== Description ==
The Gaff Memorial shows a male figure, made of bronze, seated on a tomb. He wears a loosely draped long hooded robe and raises his proper left hand over his head as he gazes upwards. The sculpture sits upon a long, flat granite base with an inscription plaque on the top, the burial of Thomas Trueman Gaff.

The sculpture is signed: J DECHIN PARIS 1922

== Gallery ==
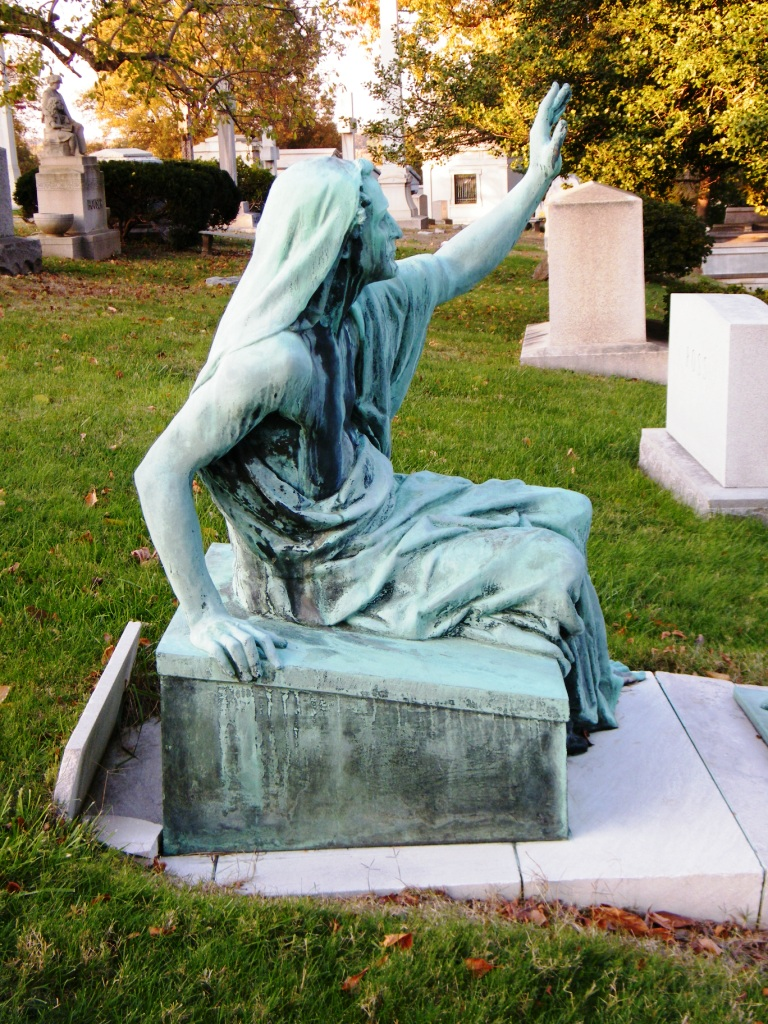
Proper Left

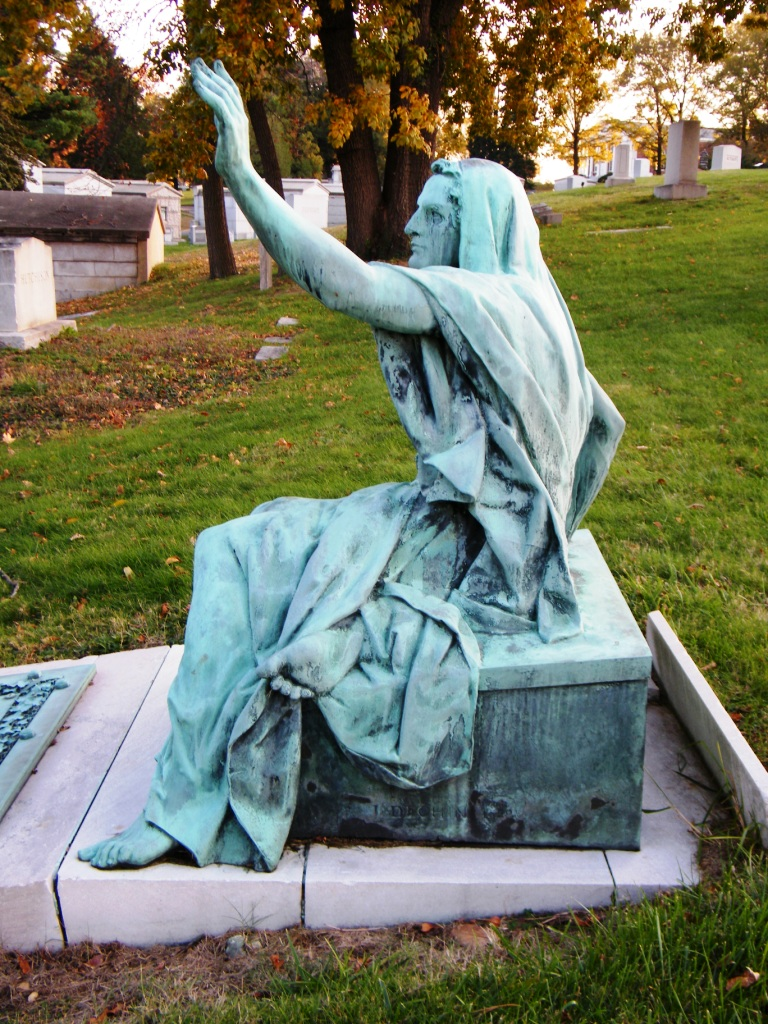
Proper Right
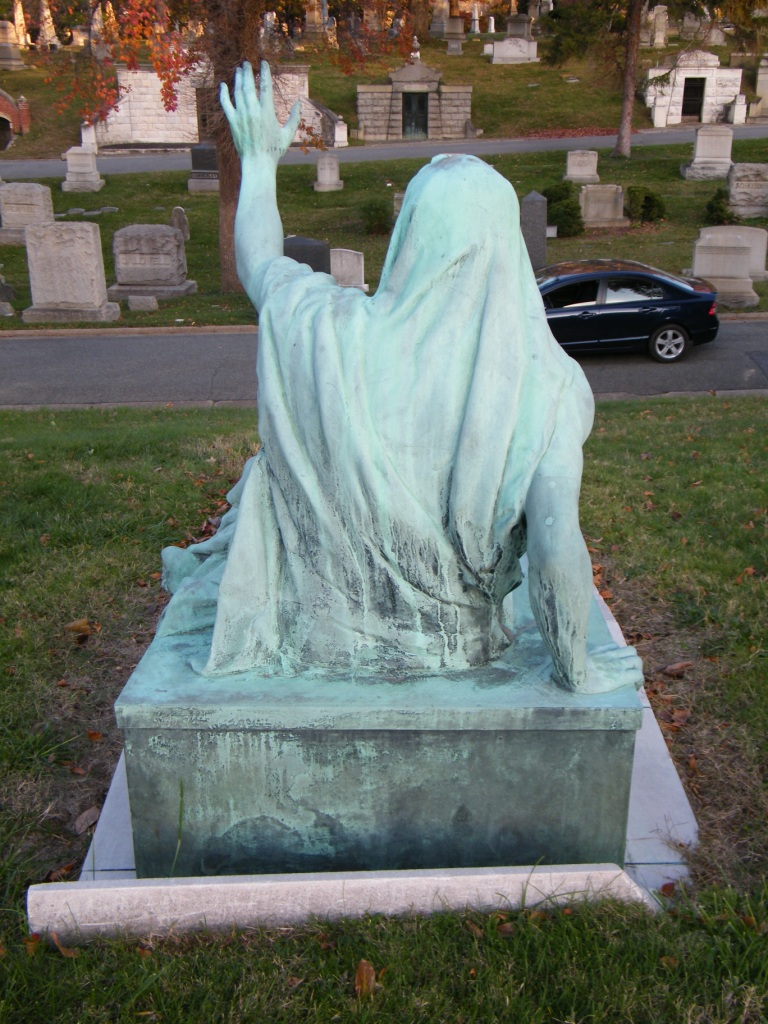
Back

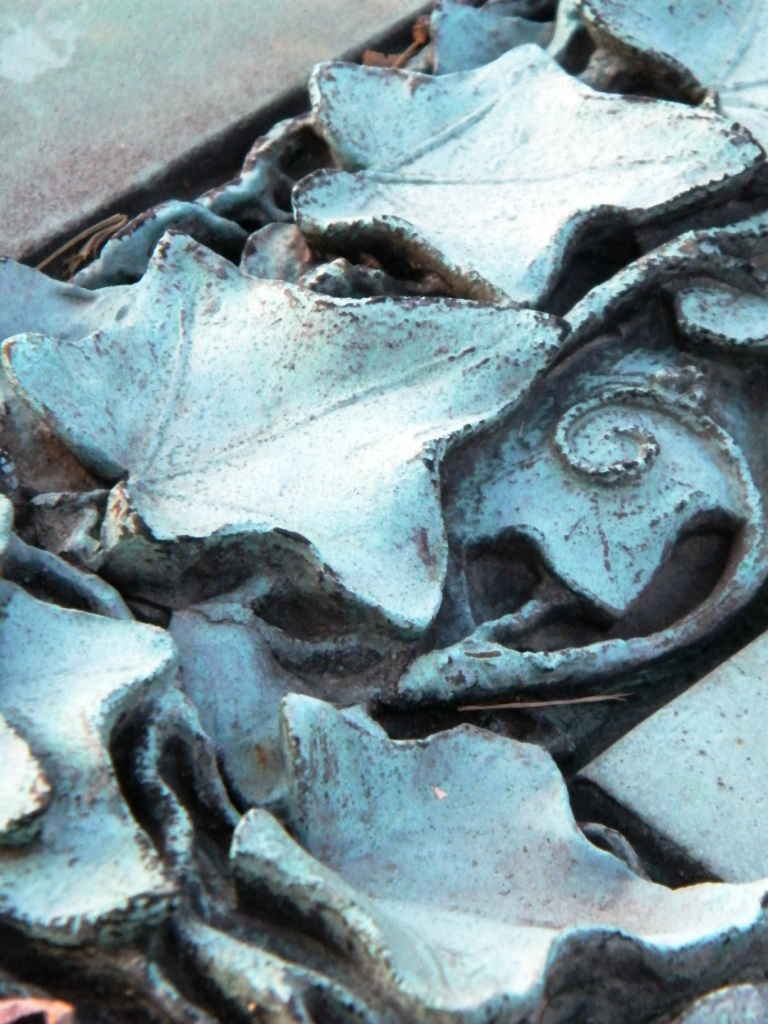
Ivy Detail
