= Johnson Memorial =

Artwork in Rock Creek Cemetery, Washington, DC

- Artist: Jno. Williams Inc.
- Type: Bronze
- Location: Washington, D.C.; 38°56′54.13″N 77°0′44.25″W
- Owner: Rock Creek Cemetery

Johnson Memorial is a public artwork from the foundry of Jno. Williams, Inc., located at Rock Creek Cemetery in Washington, D.C., United States. Johnson Memorial was originally surveyed as part of the Smithsonian's Inventory of American Painting and Sculpture in 1976–1969. The monument serves as the grave site for the Johnson family, including well-known psychiatrist Loren Bascom Taber Johnson.

== Description ==
This bronze sarcophagus is decorated with angels on all four corners and draped garlands. A draped urn is on top and the sarcophagus sits upon a granite base.

The front of the memorial is inscribed:

FRANCIS OLIVER
JOHNSON
BORN MARCH XXIV/MDCCC-LXXVII
DIED MAY XVII
MCMVI

LOREN BASCOM TABER
JOHNSON
BORN JUNE XV, MCCCLXXV
DIED DECEMBER SIV, MCMXLI

It is signed: Jno. Williams Inc. Founders, N.Y.

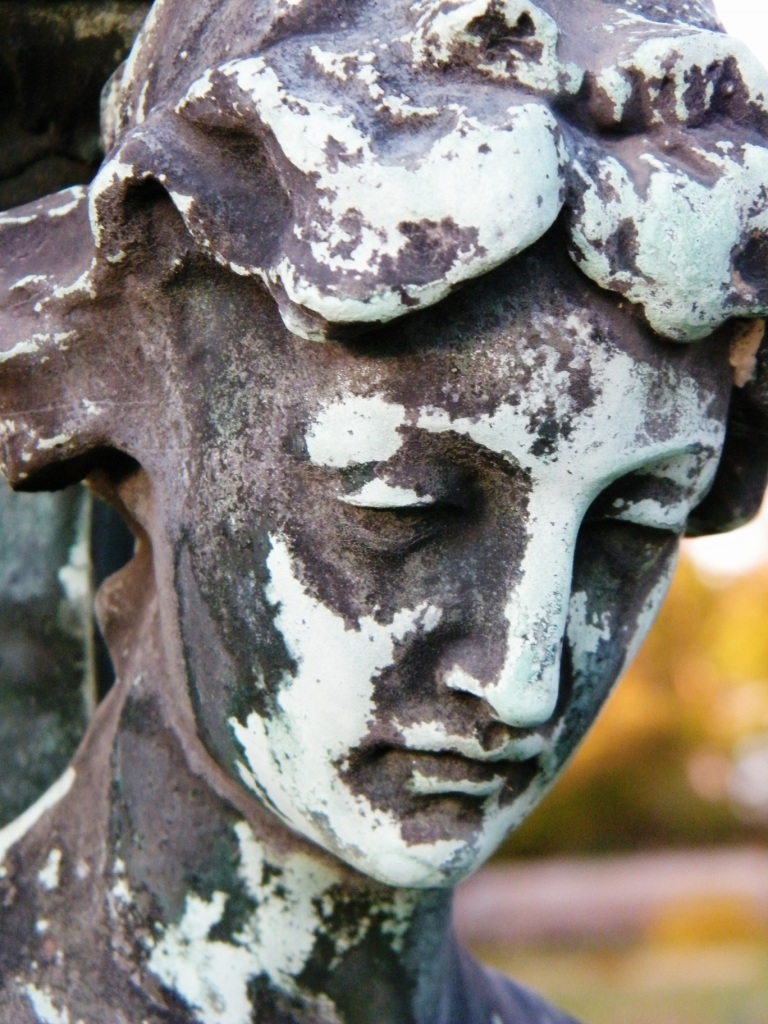
Proper Left Statue

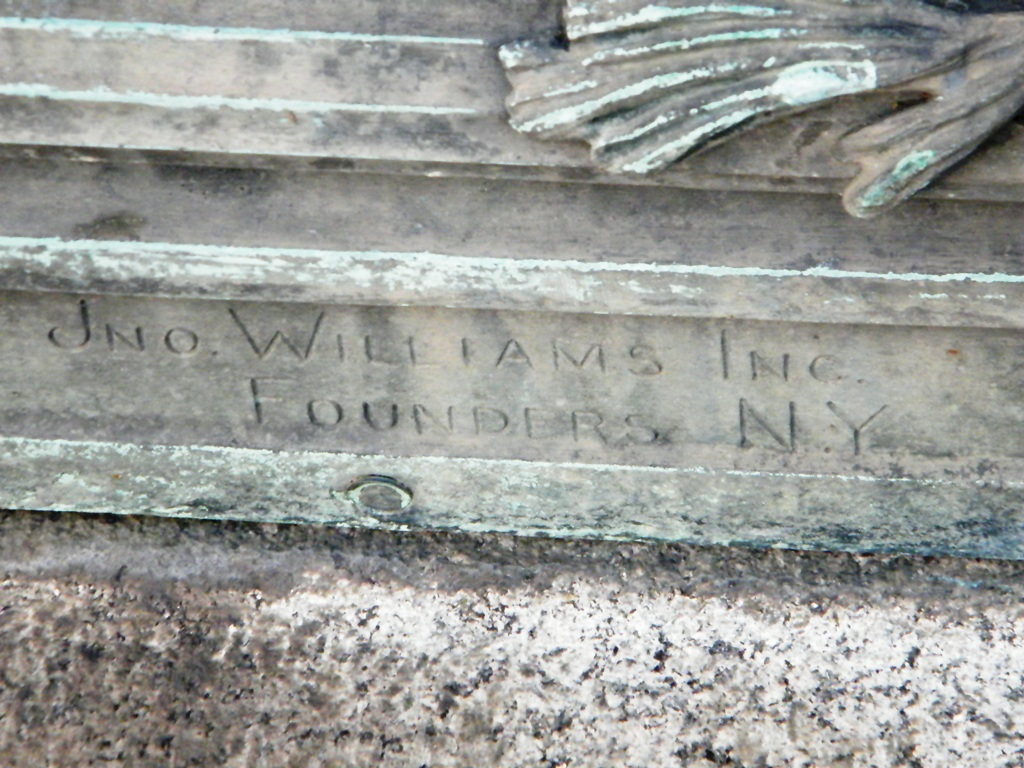
Founder's Mark

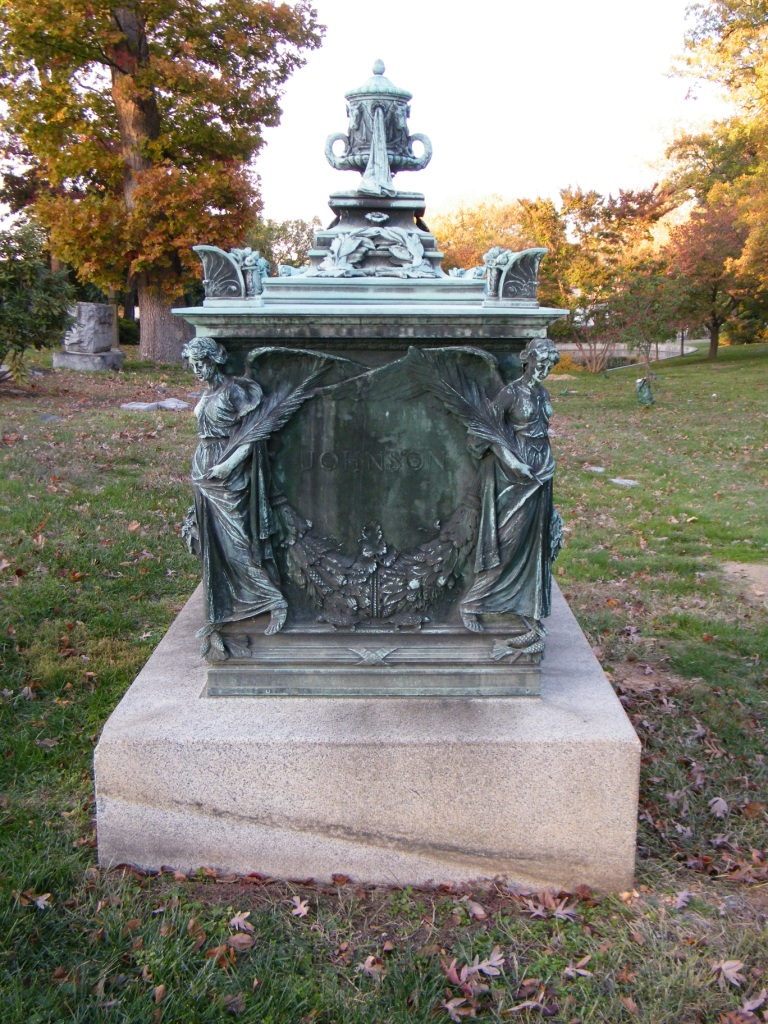
Proper Left
