= Polychrome Historic District =

Historic house in Maryland, United States

- U.S. National Register of Historic Places
- U.S. Historic district
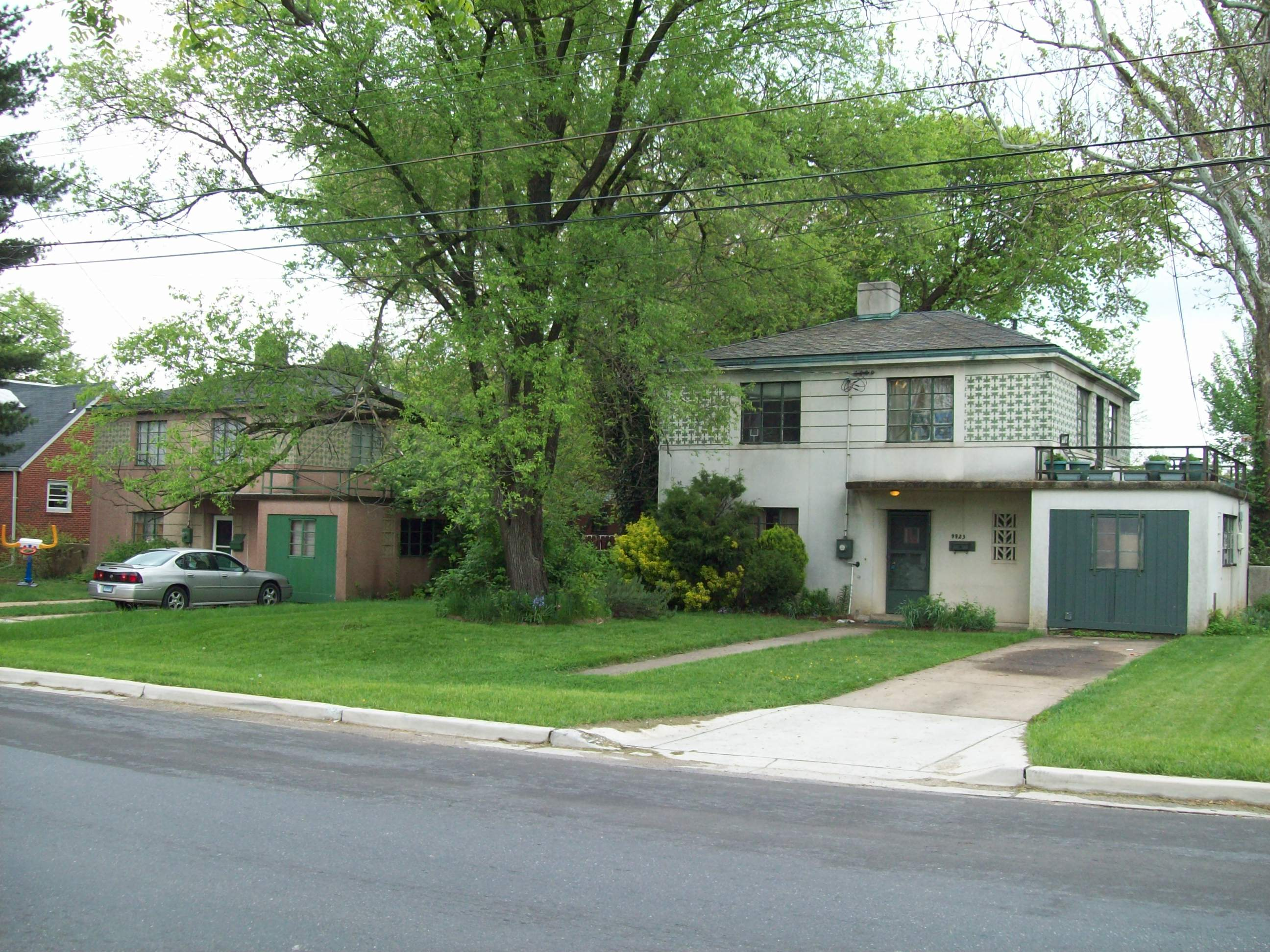
- Polychrome Historic District, April 2010

- Location within Maryland Location within the United States
- Location: 9900 and 9904 Colesville Rd., 9919, 9923, and 9925 Sutherland Rd., Silver Spring, Maryland
- Coordinates: 39°1′5″N 77°0′57″W
- Area: 1.1 acres (0.45 ha)
- Built: 1934
- Architect: Earley, John Joseph; Kennedy, J.R.
- Architectural style: Art Deco
- NRHP reference No.: 96000900
- Added to NRHP: August 29, 1996

The Polychrome Historic District is a national historic district in the Four Corners neighborhood in Silver Spring, Montgomery County, Maryland. It recognizes a group of five houses built by John Joseph Earley in 1934 and 1935. Earley used precast concrete panels with brightly colored aggregate to produce the polychrome effect, with Art Deco details. The two-inch-thick panels were attached to a conventional wood frame. Earley was interested in the use of mass-production techniques to produce small, inexpensive houses, paralleling Frank Lloyd Wright's Usonian house concepts.
