= Holy Rosary Catholic Church (Washington, D.C.) =

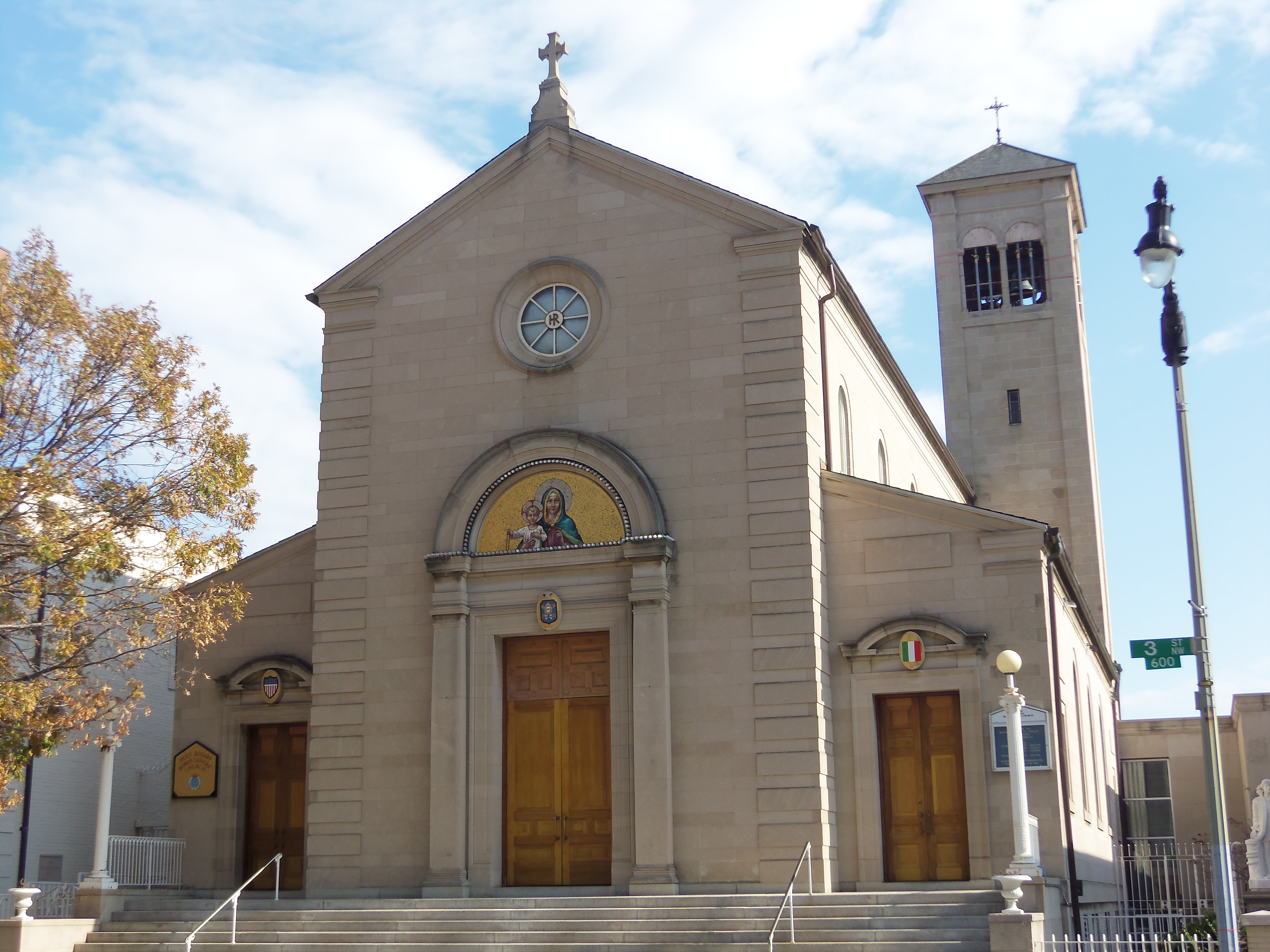
- Holy Rosary Catholic Church
- Holy Rosary Catholic Church
- 38.897583°N 77.015036°W
- Location: 595 Third Street, NW, Washington, D.C.
- Country: United States
- Denomination: Roman Catholic

History
- Founded: 1913

Administration
- Archdiocese: Washington

Clergy
- Pastor(s): Father Ezio Marchetto, c.s.

Holy Rosary was established in 1913 as a parish located in the Northwest-East Deanery of the Roman Catholic Archdiocese of Washington in an area known as Swampoodle. The parish is administered by the Scalabrinian Fathers.

== Location ==
Holy Rosary Catholic Church is located at 595 Third Street NW in Washington, D.C. It is near the National Building Museum and Judiciary Square metro station.

== History ==
Holy Rosary held its first mass on Sunday, December 14, 1913, at 83 H Street, NW, in the living room of a house rented by Father Nicola De Carlo, the first pastor. The congregation quickly outgrew this chapel and moved to a second townhouse at 902 Third Street, NW, where it stayed until it was able to build its own church. The cornerstone was laid for the third, and current, location on September 7, 1919, and the upper church was dedicated on April 29, 1923.

In the 1950s, when sections of the city were undergoing urban renewal, Holy Rosary was almost demolished when plans were proposed for the construction of I-395.

The parish celebrated its centennial on December 8, 2013.

=== Parish priests ===
- Nicola De Carlo (1913–1961)
- Giulivo Tessarolo (1961–1963)
- Giuseppe Spigolon (1963–1970)
- Mario Bordignon (1970–1972)
- Cesare Donanzan (1972–1992)
- Terry Bagatin (1992–1996)
- Charles Zanoni (1996–2006)
- Lydio Tomasi (2006–2013)
- Ezio Marchetto (2013–2021)
- Andrei Zanon (2021)
- Sergio Dall'Agense (2021-)

== Gallery ==
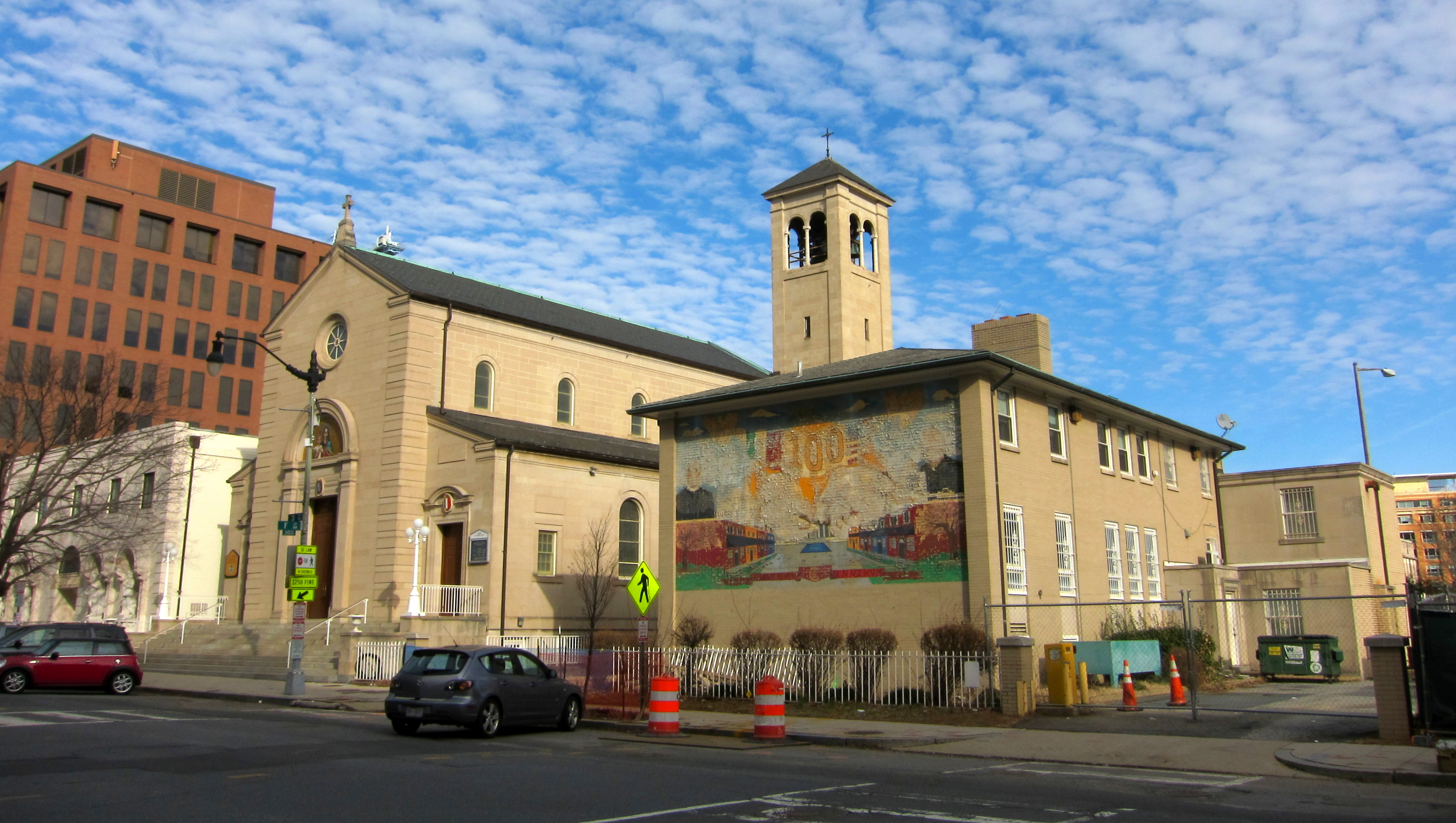
View of the church complex before the Rectory was demolished for the restoration of F street

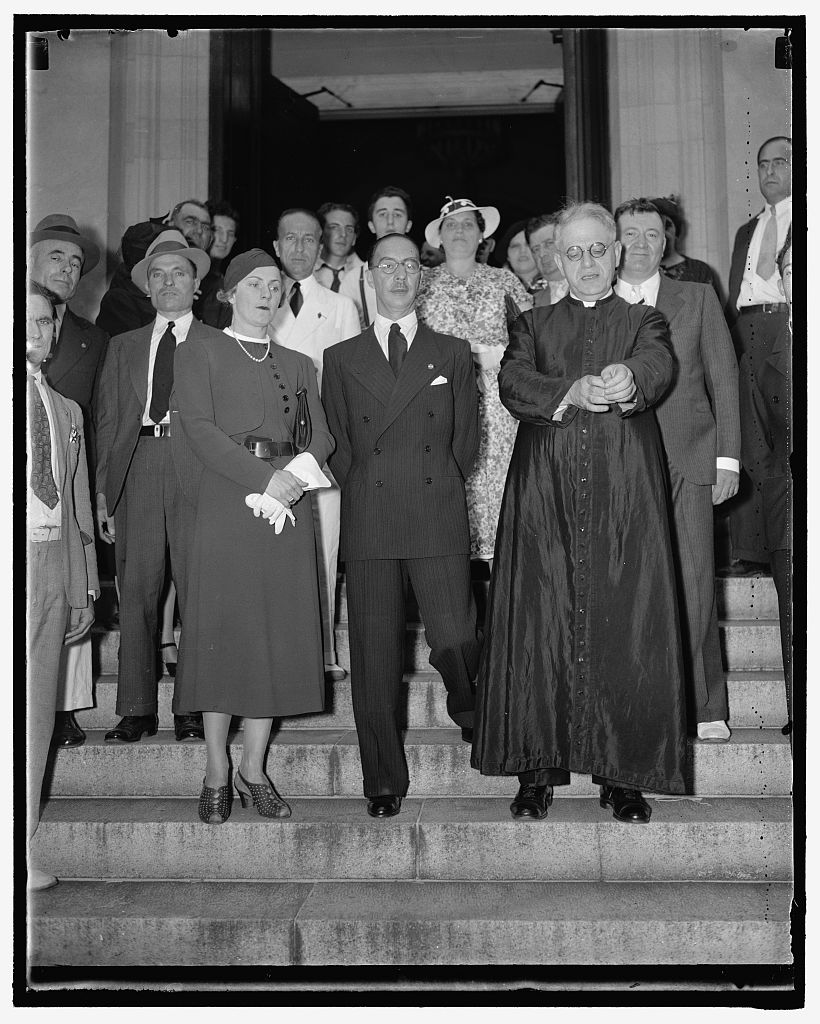
The Italian Ambassador and Senora Fulvia Suvich leaving Holy Rosary Catholic Church after attending a requiem mass in honor of Guglielmo Marconi in 1936.
