= Houser Memorial =

Public artwork in Washington, D.C., U.S.

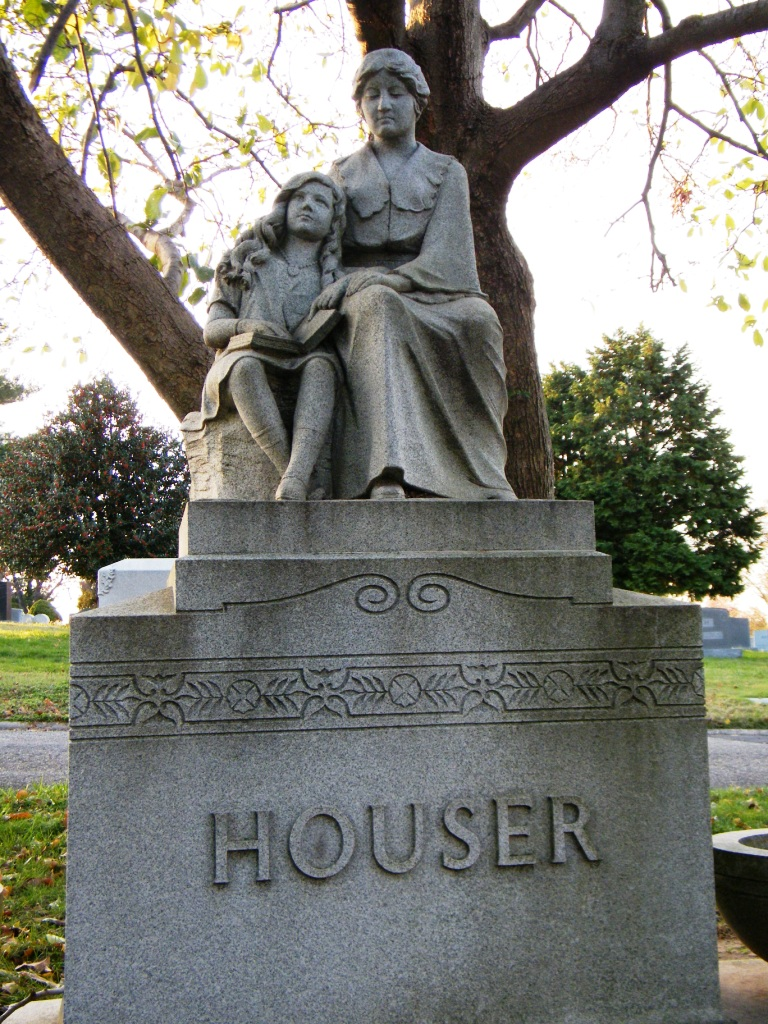
- Artist: Unknown
- Year: 1922
- Type: Granite
- Location: Washington, D.C.; 38°56′52.42″N 77°0′33.36″W
- Owner: Rock Creek Cemetery

Houser Memorial is a public artwork by an unknown artist, located at Rock Creek Cemetery in Washington, D.C., United States. Houser Memorial was originally surveyed as part of the Smithsonian's Inventories of American Painting and Sculpture. The monument is the grave of Helen L. Houser and her daughter Anna Victoria Houser

== Description ==
This grave marker features a granite sculpture of Helen Houser sitting with her daughter Anna Victoria. With her proper right arm around Anna's shoulder, Helen points with her proper left hand to a page in a book resting on Anna's lap. The sculpture sits upon a large rectangular base.

An inscription on the base reads: HOUSER

On the right side of the base:

HELEN L. HOUSER
MAR. 27 1880
AUG. 22 1934

On the left side of the base:

ANNA VICTORIA HOUSER
OCTOBER 31, 1906
JULY 3, 1918

== The Houser family ==
The Houser's were a wealthy Washington family who lived in the Logan Circle neighborhood. They owned various properties in Washington. Anna Victoria Houser was the only child of Helen and Edward Houser. When she died at age eleven, possibly of influenza, the Houser's sold their businesses and dedicated their lives to donating and raising funds for charities.

== Gallery ==
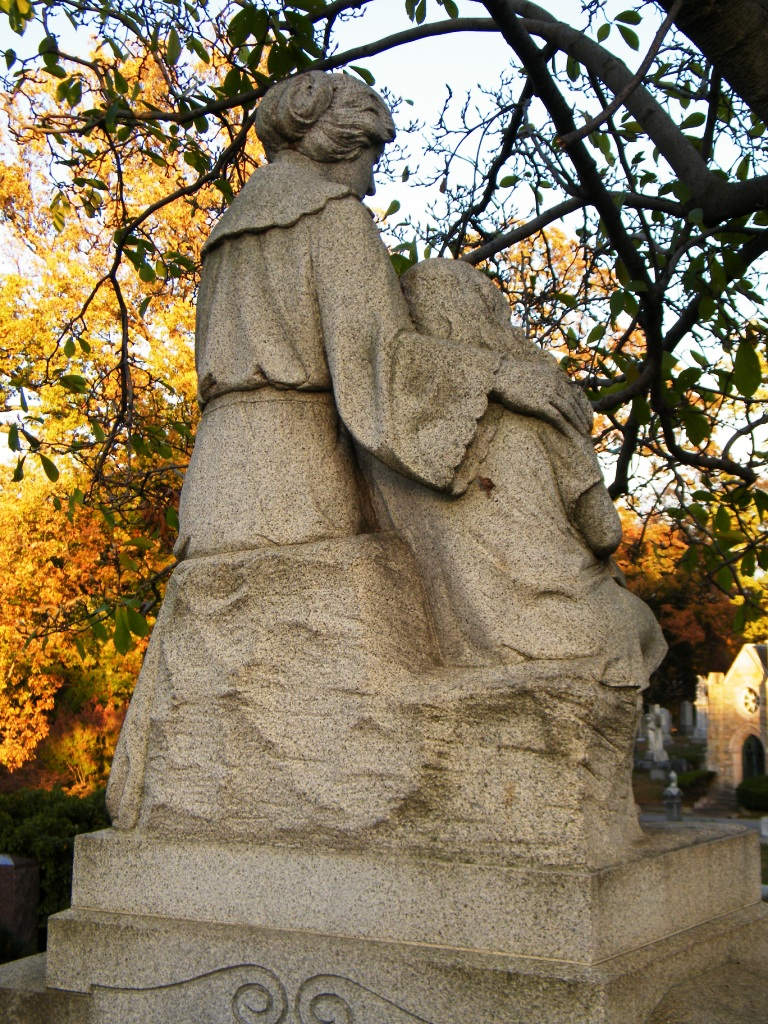
Back

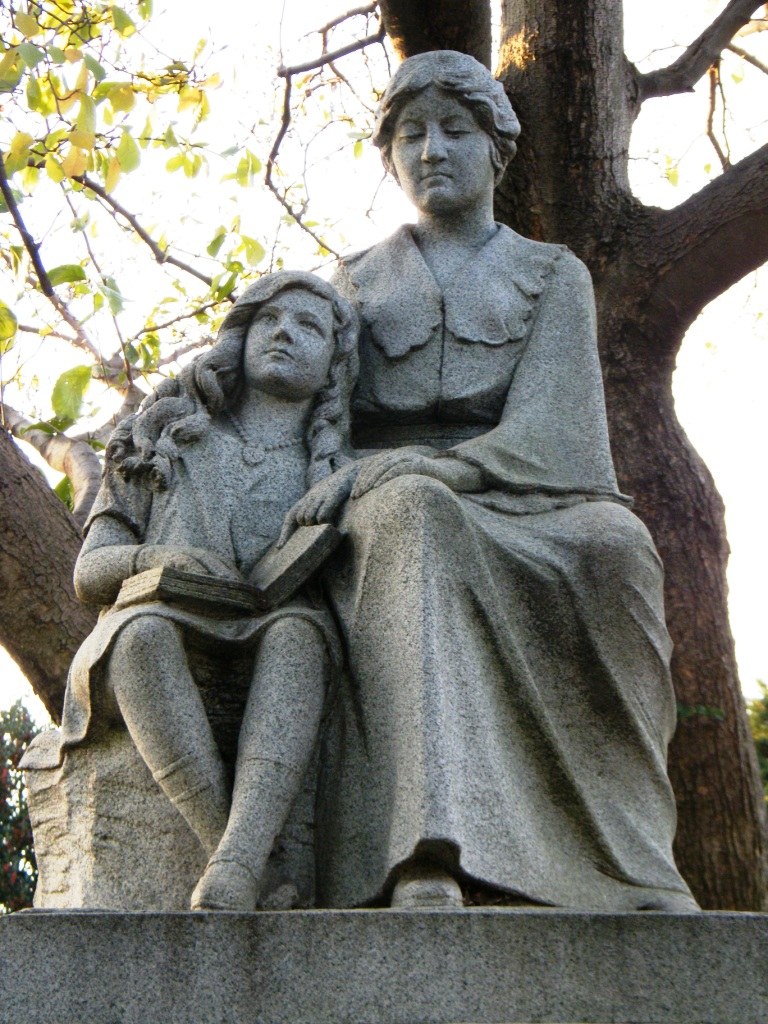
Front Detail
