= Commissariat of the Holy Land =

Commissariat of the Holy Land is the term in the Order of Friars Minor for the territory or district assigned to a commissary, whose duty it was to collect alms for the maintenance of the Catholic Holy Places in Palestine/Israel committed to the care of the Friars Minor.

The term also designates, in a more restricted sense, the Franciscan convent where the aforesaid commissary resides.

The commissary, always a member of the order, receives his appointment by letters patent from the minister general, to whom he is bound to transmit every year a detailed account of the alms received.

These alms may not, under any circumstances, without express permission of the Holy See, be applied to other purposes, however pious and meritorious, under grave ecclesiastical penalties. The alms taken up by the bishops at the annual collections for the Holy Land are conveyed to the custos in Jerusalem through the commissary in whose district the dioceses of the bishops are situated.

There were in the early 20th century forty commissariats throughout the Christian world, the most ancient being that of Naples, founded in 1333, when Robert of Anjou redeemed the Holy Places from the Sultan of Egypt. In English-speaking countries there were seven — three in the United States, one in Canada, one in Great Britain, one in Ireland, and one in Australia. The Commissariat of the United States was founded in 1882, the commissary residing in the new convent of Mount St. Sepulchre, Washington, D. C. In 1902, commissariats were erected in California and at St. Louis.
