= John Joseph Earley =

American architect

- Born: December 12, 1881; New York City, New York, U.S.
- Died: November 25, 1945; Washington, D.C., U.S.
- Occupation(s): Artisan, craftsman, architect

John Joseph Earley (1881 in New York City – November 25, 1945) was the son of James Earley, a fourth generation Irish stone carver and ecclesiastical artist. A skilled artisan, architect, and innovator in the use of concrete Earley is best known for the invention of the Earley Process, a technique also known as polychrome, architectural or mosaic concrete.

== Life ==
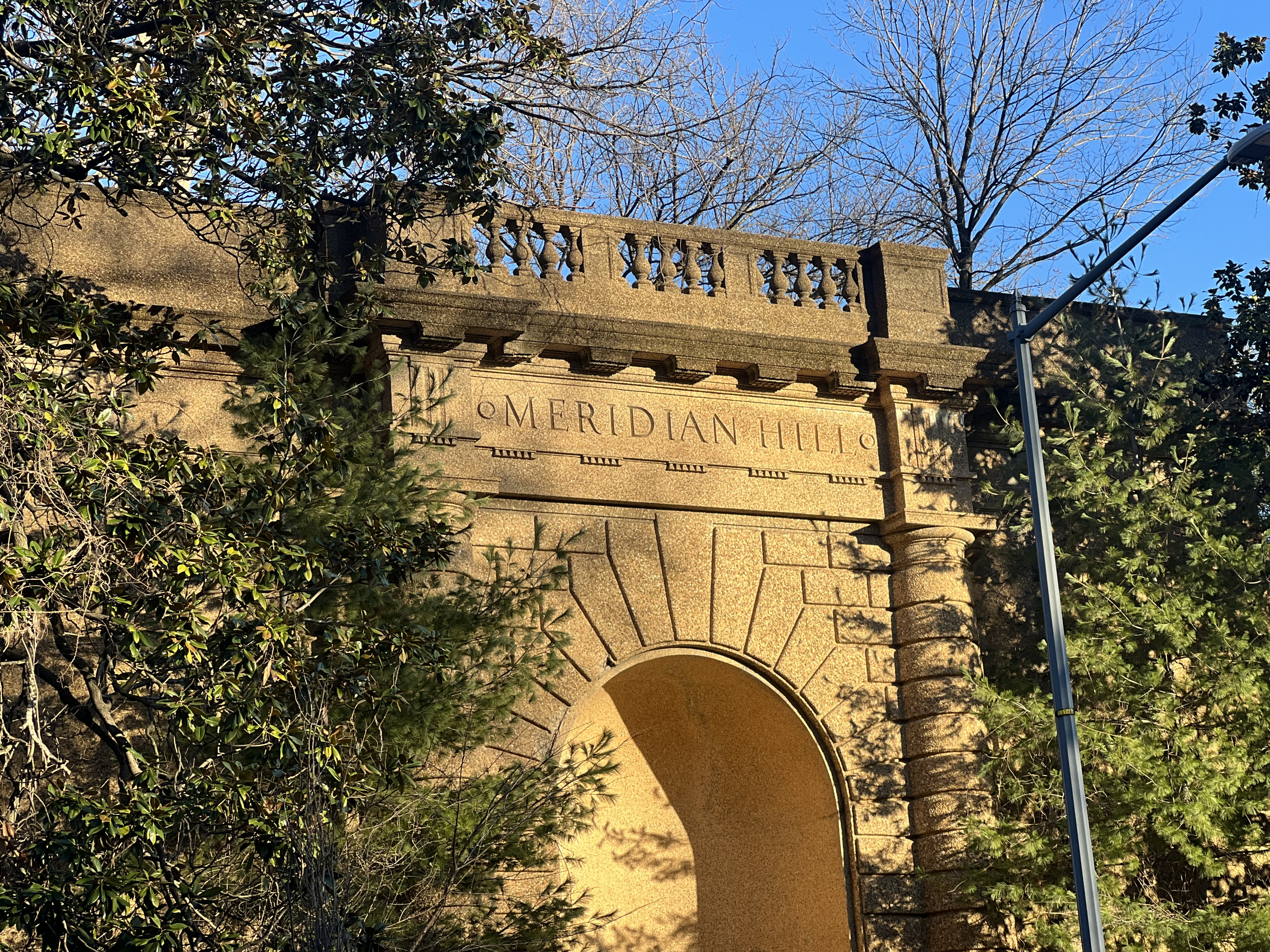
Earley's architectural concrete at Meridian Hill Park

At age seventeen, he began work as an apprentice at his father’s studio in Rosslyn, Virginia to learn sculpture, modelmaking, and stonecarving. James Earley moved his family to Washington, DC in 1900 and leased property on G Street to build a new home for his business. Basil Taylor, another apprentice, impressed James with his ability and when James became seriously ill, he asked Taylor to stay on and help his son run the studio. In 1907, he built the John J. Earley Office and Studio at 2131 G Street, Northwest, Washington, D.C.

After his father’s death, John Earley and Basil Taylor changed the focus of the work from stone and sculpture to plaster and stucco and over the next several years built the Earley Studio to become a significant business. The Earley Studio received contracts for both government and private work, including the remodeling of the interior of the White House during President Roosevelt’s first term, and the elaborate main lobby of the new building for the Willard Hotel, constructed in 1902 at Pennsylvania Avenue and 14th Street NW in Washington, DC.

In 1906, Earley began investigating exposed aggregate concrete. Attracted to the use of color in Byzantine architecture, he was interested in trying to duplicate this effect in concrete. In 1914, Earley modeled a stylized Indian Head bust for the Q Street Bridge, now known as the Dumbarton Bridge, being constructed over Rock Creek Park in Washington, DC, using as a basis the life mask of Sioux Chief Kicking Bear (from Earley's model, 56 sandstone busts were then carved for the bridge).

In 1915, John Earley worked closely with the Commission of Fine Arts and produced a full-size mock up of a wall section for Meridian Hill Park. While Cass Gilbert, Chairman of the Commission, suggested that an acceptable finish for the walls might be produced by imitating Italian pebble mosaics, it was Earley that developed the technique of mixing the aggregate in the concrete and scrubbing the surface to produce a natural-looking pebble finish. Earley called the result “architectural concrete”, and it was used with great success for the walls, balustrades, benches, urns, and obelisks of Meridian Hill Park.

From 1934 to November 1945, the Earley Studio worked on several notable architectural concrete structures including the Bahá'í House of Worship (Wilmette, Illinois), Shrine of the Sacred Heart, the Thomas Alva Edison Memorial and the experimental “Polychrome Houses” built in Silver Spring, Maryland. While working on the Edison Memorial project, Earley suffered a stroke and died two weeks later on November 25, 1945. On his deathbed he sold the Earley Studio to Basil Taylor for a single dollar.

His papers are held at the Archives of American Art.

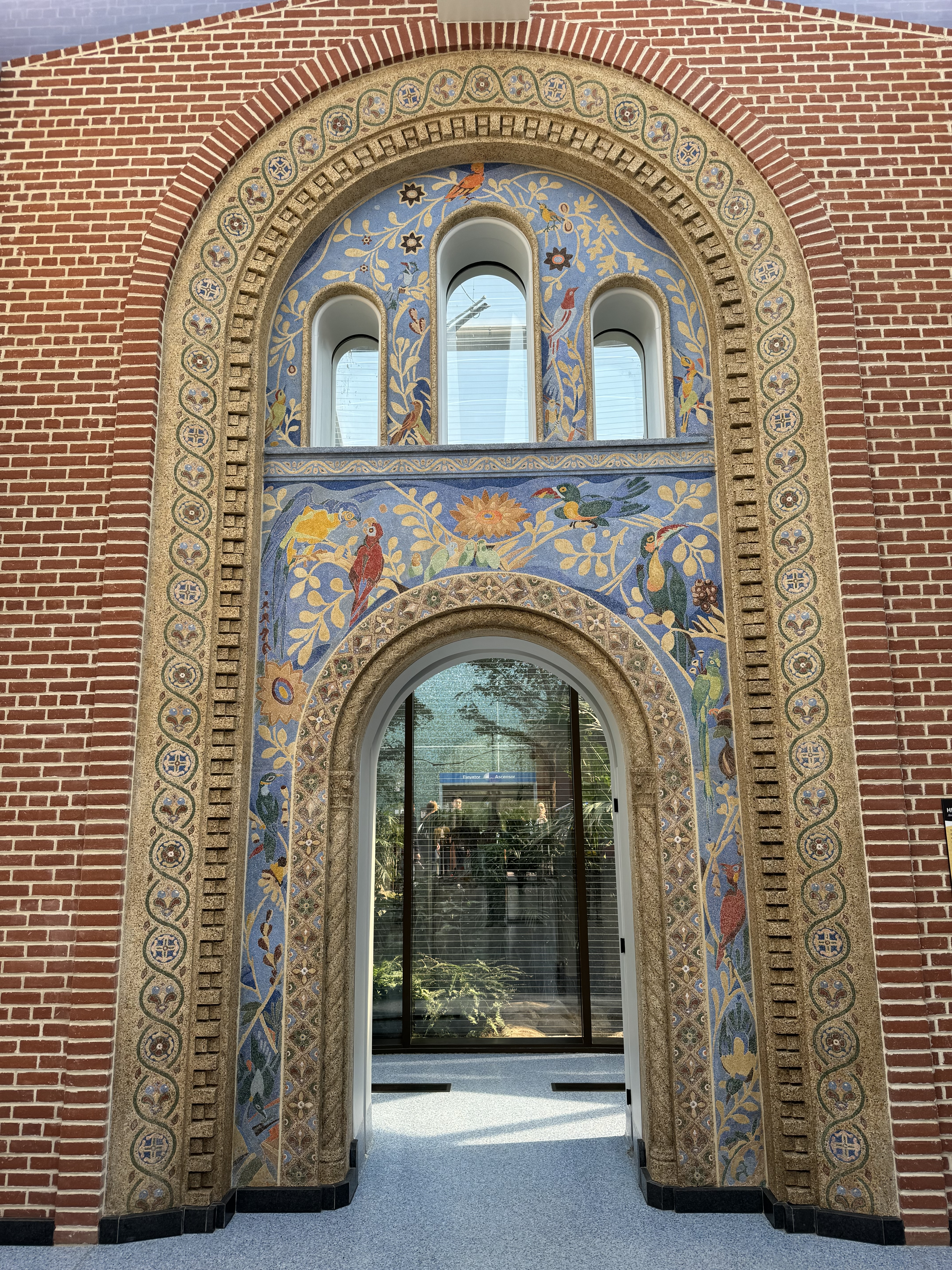
A 1928 mosaic by Earley adorns the Bird House at the National Zoo in Washington, DC.

== List of projects ==
- Bahá'í House of Worship (Wilmette, Illinois)
- Dumbarton Bridge (Washington, D.C.)
- Peace Cross (Washington. D.C.)
- Saints Philip and James Catholic Church (Baltimore, MD)
- Shrine of the Sacred Heart (Washington, DC)
- Meridian Hill Park (Washington, D.C.)
- Willard Hotel (Washington, DC)
- The John K. Mullen of Denver Memorial Library, The Catholic University of America (Washington, DC)
- Royal Thai Embassy - Consular Offices (Washington, DC)
