= Henry Bryceson =

British organ builder (1775–1870)

- Born: 1775; Perth, Scotland
- Died: 1870 (aged 94–95)
- Occupation: Organ builder
- Years active: 1796–1860 (approx.)
- Known for: Pioneer of electric action in organ building founder of Bryceson Brothers
- Notable work: Organ in St Leonard's-in-the-Fields Church, Perth, Scotland; Organ in the Anglican church at Isle Abbots

Henry Bryceson (1775–1870) was an organ builder and pioneer of electric action in England during the 1860s.

Henry was born in Perth, Scotland, whose St Leonard's-in-the-Fields Church still operates one of his organs.

Henry Bryceson founded a firm variously known as Bryceson Brothers, Bryceson and Bryceson, and Bryceson and Son in 1796. The firm produced both barrel organs and pipe organs. An example of his work from about 1835 can be seen in the Anglican church at Isle Abbots. In 1862 Henry built the first electric key-action organ which he installed in Drury Lane Theatre in 1862. In 1868 the firm acquired sole rights to use the electro-pneumatic technology originally developed by Charles S. Barker in France.

Henry had two sons, Henry (born 1832) and John (born 1839), who both worked for the firm Henry senior retired around 1860.
