= Barker lever =

The Barker lever is a pneumatic system which multiplies the force of a finger on the key of a tracker pipe organ. It employs the wind pressure of the organ to inflate small bellows called "pneumatics" to overcome the resistance of the pallets (valves) in the organ's wind-chest. This lever allowed for the development of larger, more powerful organs still responsive to the human hand. These larger organs first flourished in France, e.g., the organ produced by Cavaillé-Coll at St. Sulpice. The first Barker lever was built in the Cavaillé-Coll organ of the Basilica of Saint-Denis.

This mechanism was named after Charles Spackman Barker (1804-79), engineer and organ-builder. A similar lever was developed by David Hamilton in 1835, and there has been debate whether Barker stole the design.

== Operation ==
Schematic cross-section of the Barker mechanism

A Barker lever uses the organ's air pressure to reinforce the action of each key.

Air pressure in Chamber A is maintained by the organ's wind system. When a keyboard key is pressed, Valve 1 opens and Valve 3 closes, inflating Bellows C and actuating the tracker and thus opening the valve of the wind chest linked to the key. Meanwhile, Valve 2 closes, thereby isolating the bellows from Chamber B. The bellows remains inflated until the organist releases the key and Valve 3 is reopened. Weight G forces the air in the bellows to be discharged quickly.

== Bibliography ==
- George Laing Miller: "The Recent Revolution in Organ Building", 1913, chapter III
- John H. Lienhard (2005). "Of Organs and Engines". The Engines of Our Ingenuity. Episode 1973. NPR. KUHF-FM Houston. No 1973: Of Organs and Engines (transcript). Compares Barker-lever to similar devices in the Corliss steam engine. He cites the Grove's article below and other good web sources, e.g. Bridgeman-Sutton.
- David Bridgeman-Sutton: "Barker-lever". This is based on the following two print sources, Hinton suggesting Barker's copying & Thistlethwaite noting the differences in design.
- John William Hinton: The Story of the Electric Organ. London: Simpkin, Marshall, Hamilton, Kent & Co., 1909.
- Nicholas Thistlethwaite: The Making of the Victorian Organ. Cambridge Musical Texts and Monographs. Cambridge: Cambridge University Press, 1990. Pp. 352–354.
- P. Williams: "Organ." The New Grove Dictionary of Music & Musicians. (Stanley Sadie, ed.), vol. 13, New York: Macmillan, 1995, pp. 710–779.
- Hans Dieter Meyer: Buchholz und Haupt, oder: Wie der Barkerhebel nach Deutschland kam. In: Ars organi 52 (2004). ISSN 0004-2919
- Duncan Mathews, Charles Barker's Wondrous Machines. In: Organ builder 5 (2008), 17-20.
