= Charles S. Barker =

British inventor and organ builder (1806–1879)

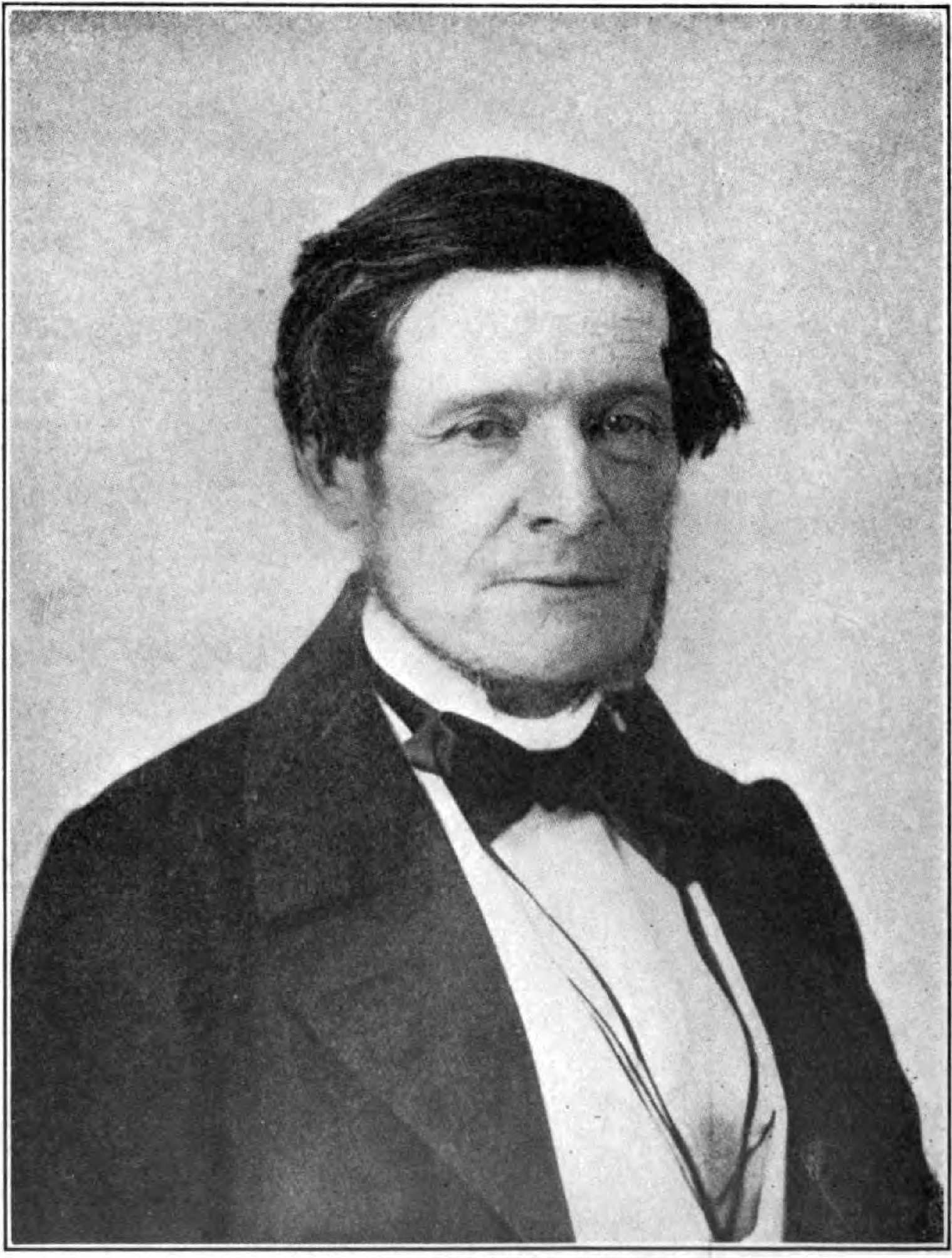
Charles Spackman Barker

Charles Spackman Barker (10 October 1806 – 26 November 1879 in Maidstone, England) was a British inventor and organ builder.

Barker was born in January 1806 in Walcot, Somerset, England. His father died when he was five and he was adopted by his godfather. After he left school, he was apprenticed to an apothecary and chemist in Bath, Somerset. He disliked this work and left to learn organ building. During this time, the organist at York Minster complained to Barker that the tracker action was so heavy that at times he had to stop playing. Barker started doing experiments with compressed air. At first he tried using pistons but found that the friction was too great. He then developed a bellows system which was satisfactory, resulting in a primitive type of pneumatic lever. He approached Messrs. Hill, the builders of the organ at York Minster but they were unreceptive. He therefore decided to go to France.

He went to France in 1837 where he met Aristide Cavaillé-Coll who was working on the organ at the Basilica of St Denis, near Paris. In order to protect his invention, he took out a French patent in 1839. Soon after, the pneumatic lever was applied to the organ at St. Denis with great success.

He also met Albert Peschard, organist of the Church of St. Etienne, Caen, who commenced to experiment in electro-pneumatics in 1860, and early in 1861 communicated his discoveries to Barker. From that date until Barker left France, he collaborated with him.

He exhibited work at the Great Exhibition in 1851, and went on to pioneer the use of electricity in organs. Henry Bryceson made organs to his patent under licence in England.

He received the Legion of Honour in 1855 but was expelled from France in 1870 owing to the expulsion of aliens consequent to the Franco-Prussian War. He died in Maidstone, Kent, on 26 November 1879.
