= St Maurice's Church, Strasbourg =

Roman Catholic church in Strasbourg, France

St Maurice's Church
- French: Église Saint-Maurice
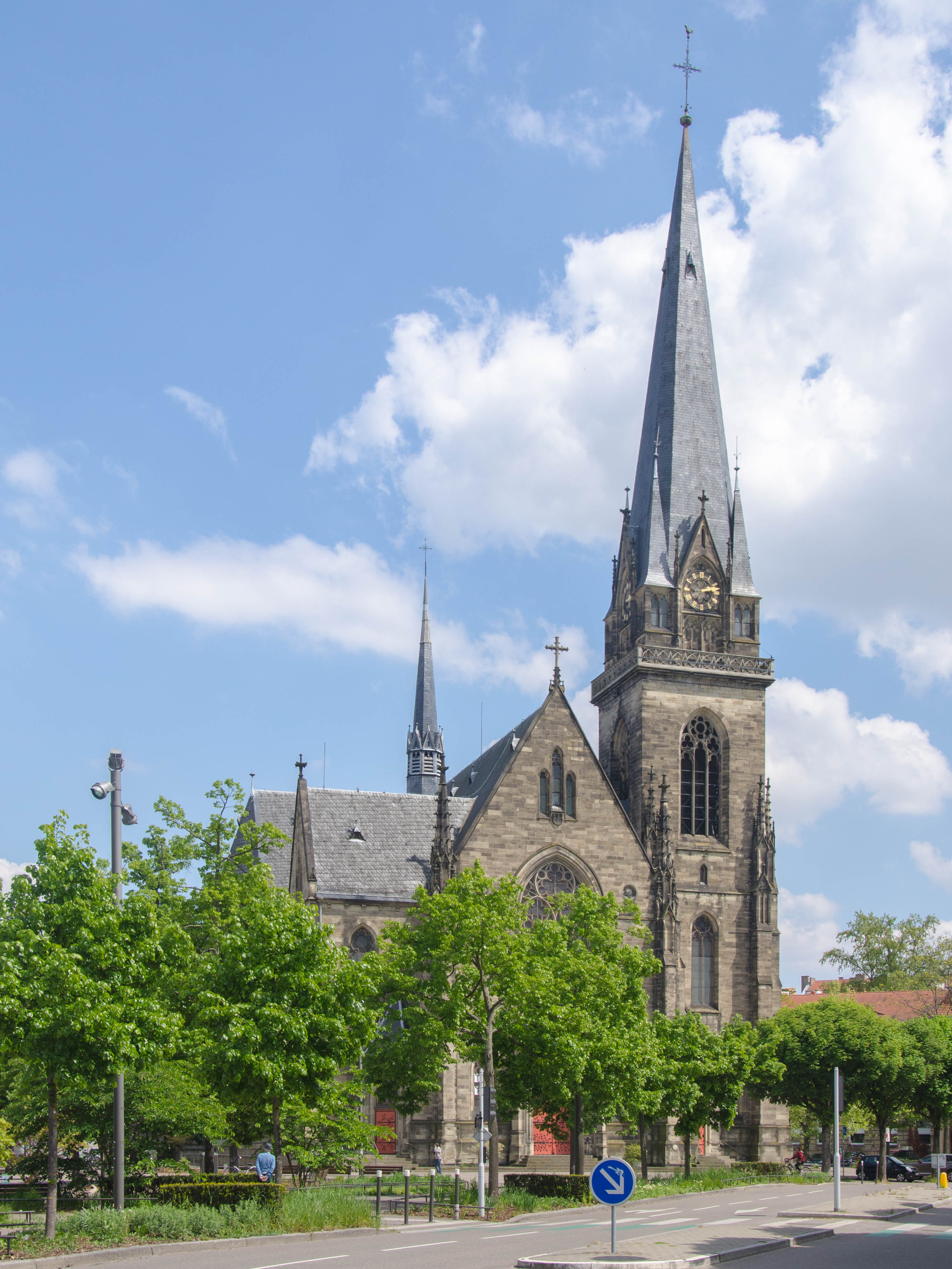

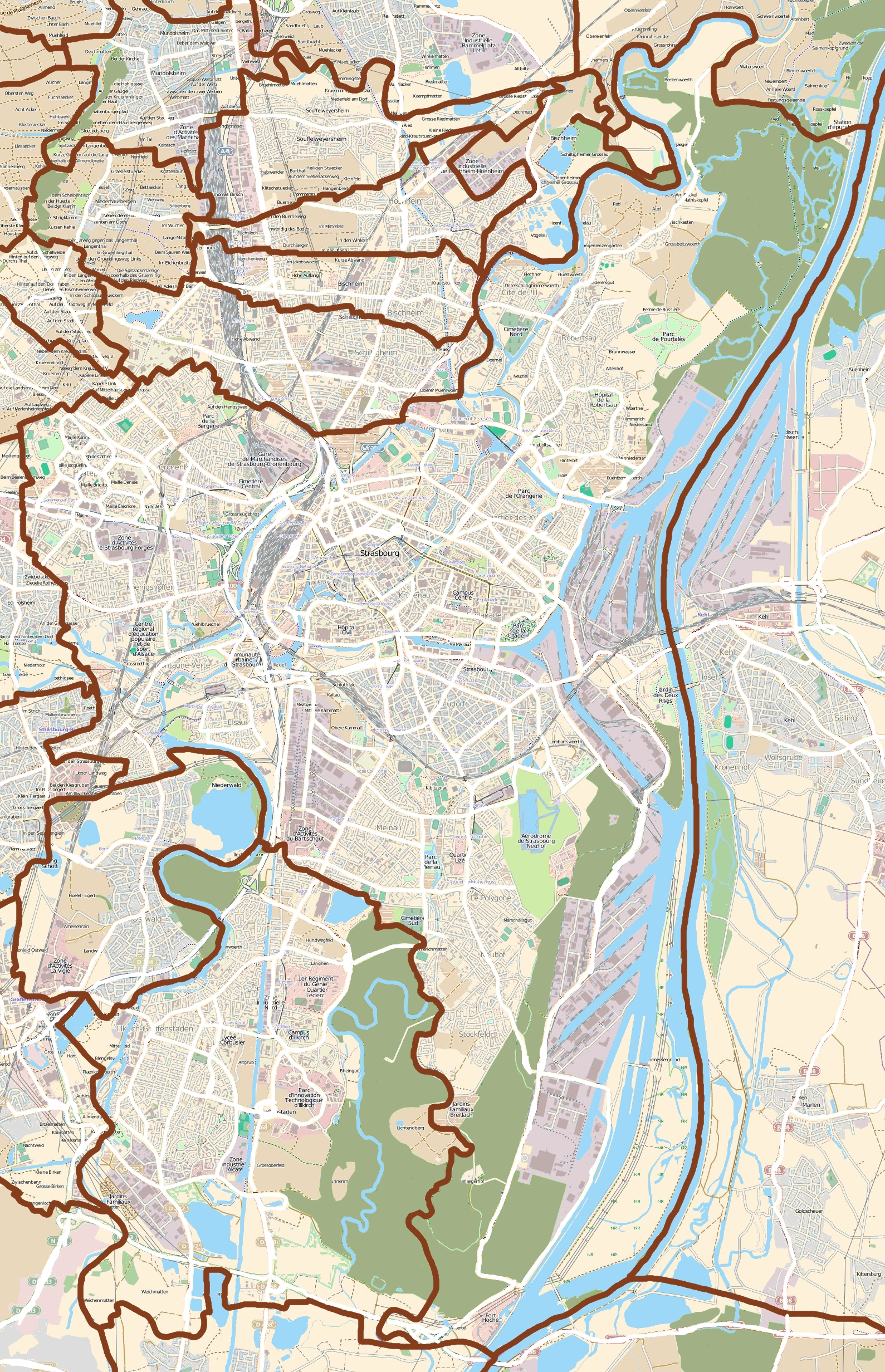
- Location within Paris and the inner ring
- 48°35′05″N 7°46′14″E
- Location: Neustadt district, Strasbourg
- Country: France
- Denomination: Roman Catholic

History
- Status: Parish church
- Dedication: Saint Maurice
- Consecrated: 28 May 1899

Architecture
- Functional status: Active
- Architectural type: Church
- Style: Gothic Revival
- Groundbreaking: November 1895

Administration
- Archdiocese: Strasbourg

St Maurice's Church (French: église Saint-Maurice) is a Roman Catholic church building located on Place Arnold in the Neustadt district of Strasbourg, France. It was built during the Annexation of Alsace-Lorraine into the German Empire in the late 19th century.

== History ==
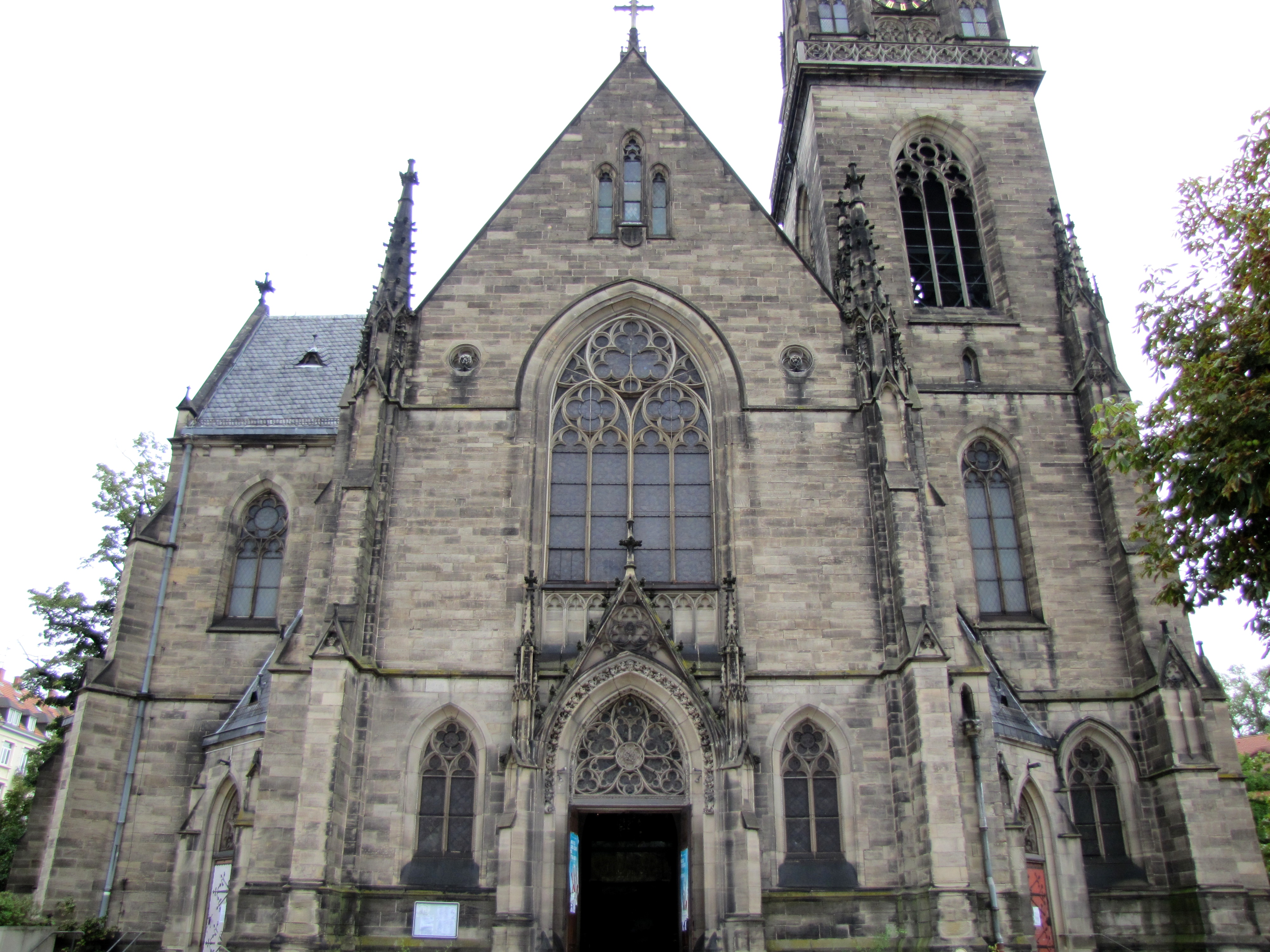
The façade of the church.

The construction works of the church started in November 1895 within the framework of the construction of the Neustadt district. The church was designed by architect Ludwig Becker from Mainz, whose preliminary draft was selected during an architectural competition in 1893. After several years of construction works, the church was consecrated on 28 May 1899. It was originally the church of the Catholic garrison of the city.

On 21 February 2013, the church was vandalised by a man who damaged about fifteen statues and laid an Islamic prayer rug and a Qur'an which he had stolen in a mosque. The man probably suffered from mental illness.

== Architecture ==
The Gothic Revival church was meant to be visible from far away, like the Protestant Church of St. Paul. The tall and thin bell tower of St Maurice is 65 meters high and was placed in the several-kilometer-long perspective of Avenue des Vosges and Avenue de la Forêt-Noire which connect Place de Haguenau to Place Arnold.

A 1897 cast of Paul Dubois's statue of Joan of Arc is located to the east of St Maurice's Church. The statue used to stand at the entrance of the church but was moved after Place Arnold was renovated.

== Interior ==
The main altar shows the life of St. Maurice, while the upper crucifix is surrounded by representations of St. Mary and St. John.

In the southern chapel, an altarpiece depicts the Virgin Mary.

The side chapel has a modern artwork made by Sylvie Lander.

All the windows of the church are filled with stained glass.

=== Organ ===
The organ of the church was made by Friedrich Weigle in 1899. It has 43 stops and 3 keyboards, as follows:

I Grand Orgue C–g^{3}
Principal	16′
Principal	8′
Bourdon	8′
Wienerfloete	8′
Viole de gambe	8′
Octave	4′
Flûte à cheminée	4′
Doublette	2′
Cornet III-V	8′
Mixture VI	3 1/5′
Bombarde	16′
Trompette	8′
Clairon	4′

II Positif expressif C–g^{3}
Geigenprincipal	8′
Hohlfloete	8′
Salicional	8′
Unda maris	8′
Flûte harm. solo	4′
Nasard	2 2/3′
Cornet III	4′
Basson	16′
Trompette harm.	8′
Clairon	4′
Clarinet	8′
Trémolo

III Récit expressif C–g^{3}
Quintaton	16′
Bourdon double	8′
Gemshorn	8′
Viole	8′
Aéoline	8′
Voix céleste	8′
Flûte traverse	4′
Flageolet	2′
Plein-jeu V
Hautbois	8′
Voix humaine	8′
Trémolo

Pédale C–g^{1}
Principal acoustique	32′
Principal	16′
Violoncelle	16′
Soubasse	16′
Octavebasse	8′
Violoncelle	8′
Choralbass	4′
Posaune 16′

- Couplers: II/I (also sub-octave coupler), III/I, III/II, I/P, II/P, III/P

== Images ==
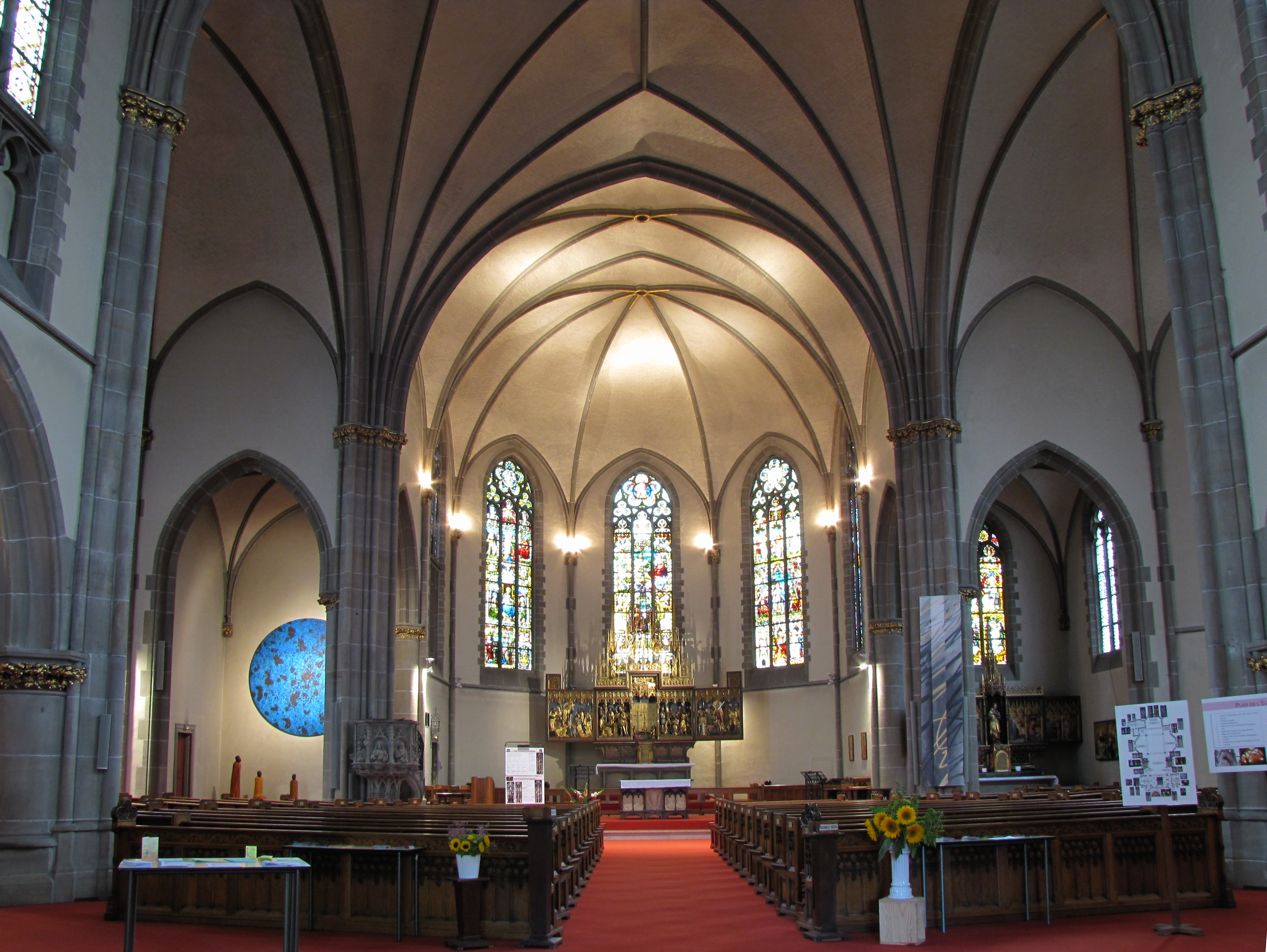
Interior, looking east

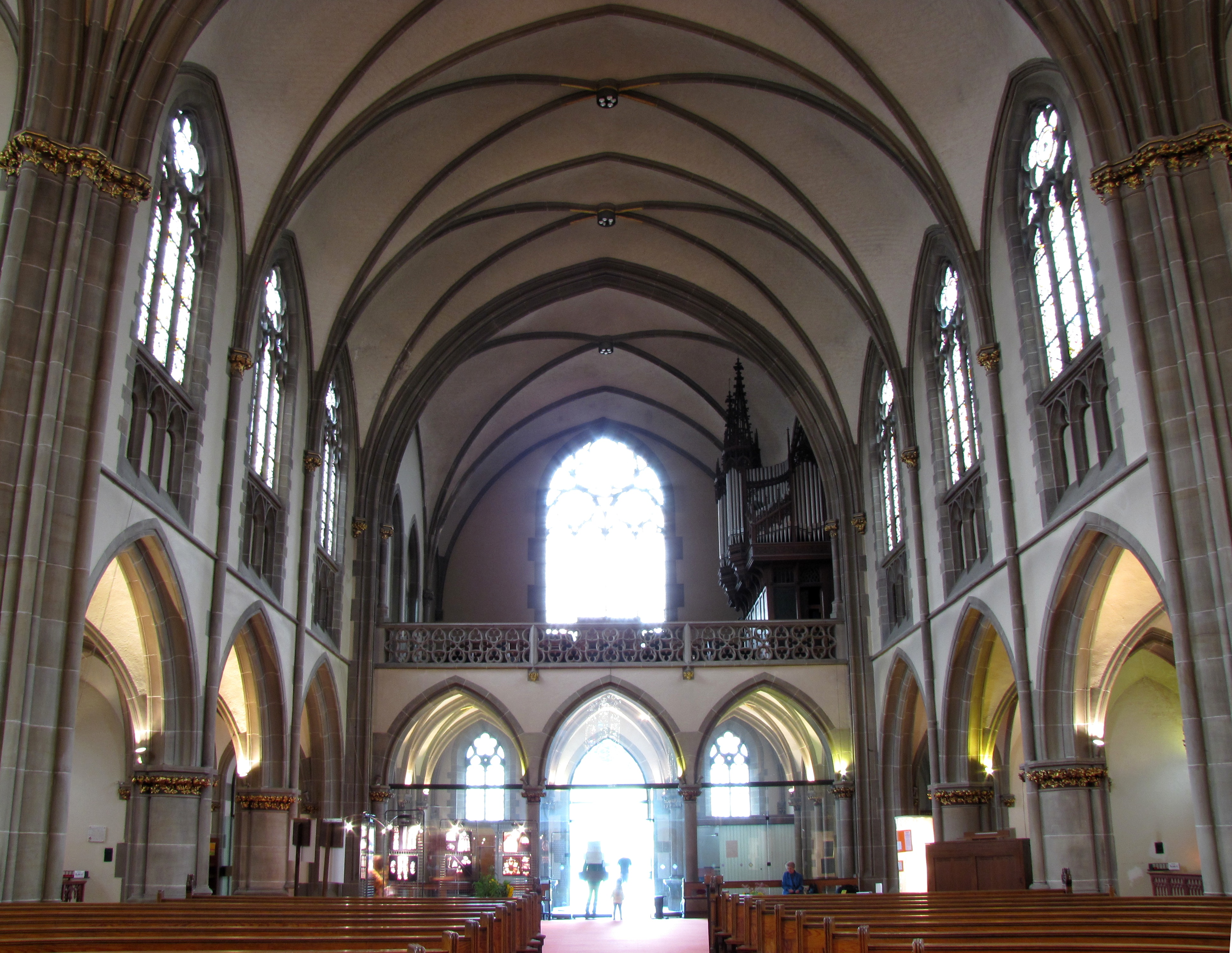
Interior, looking west

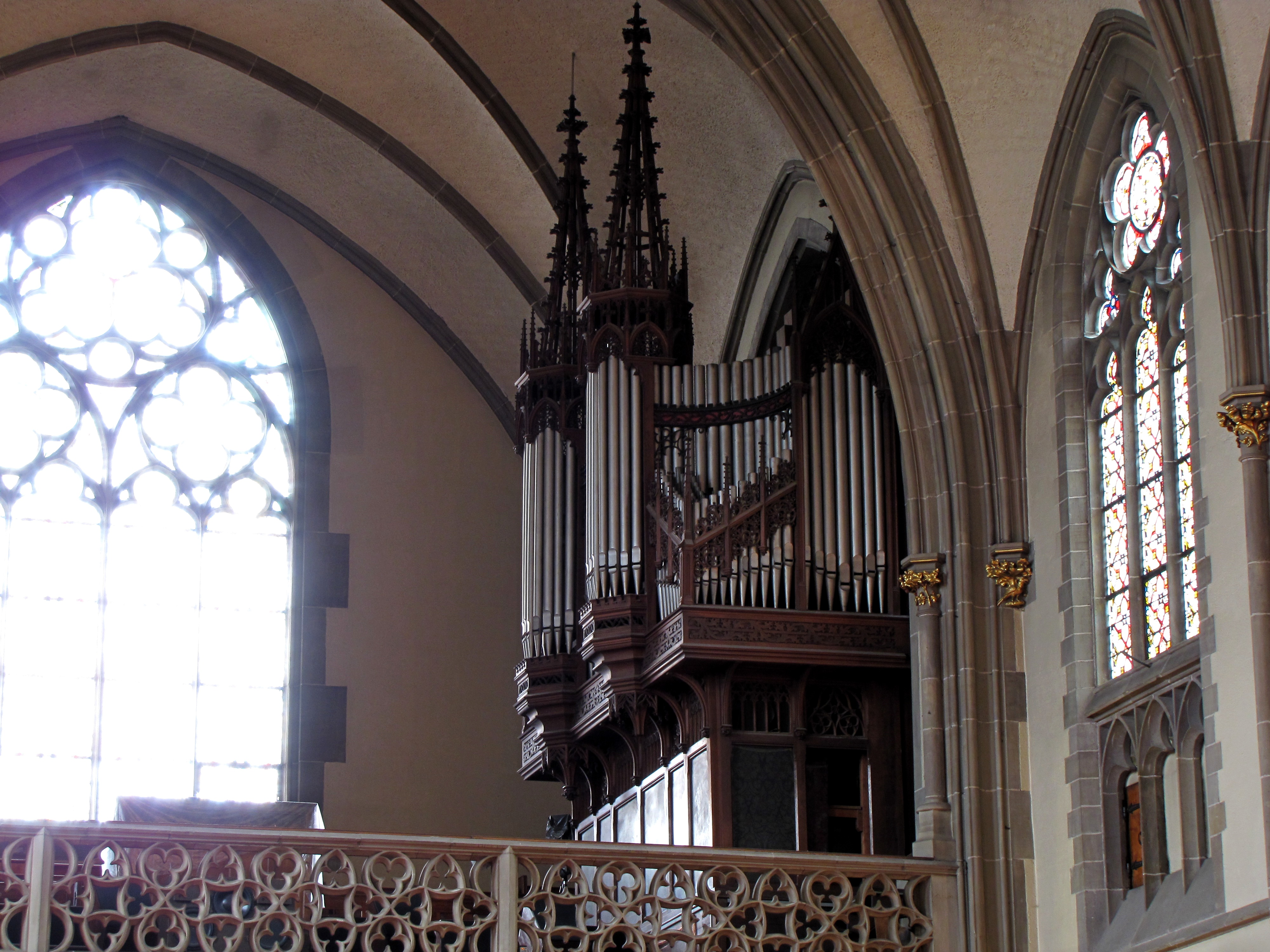
Pipe organ

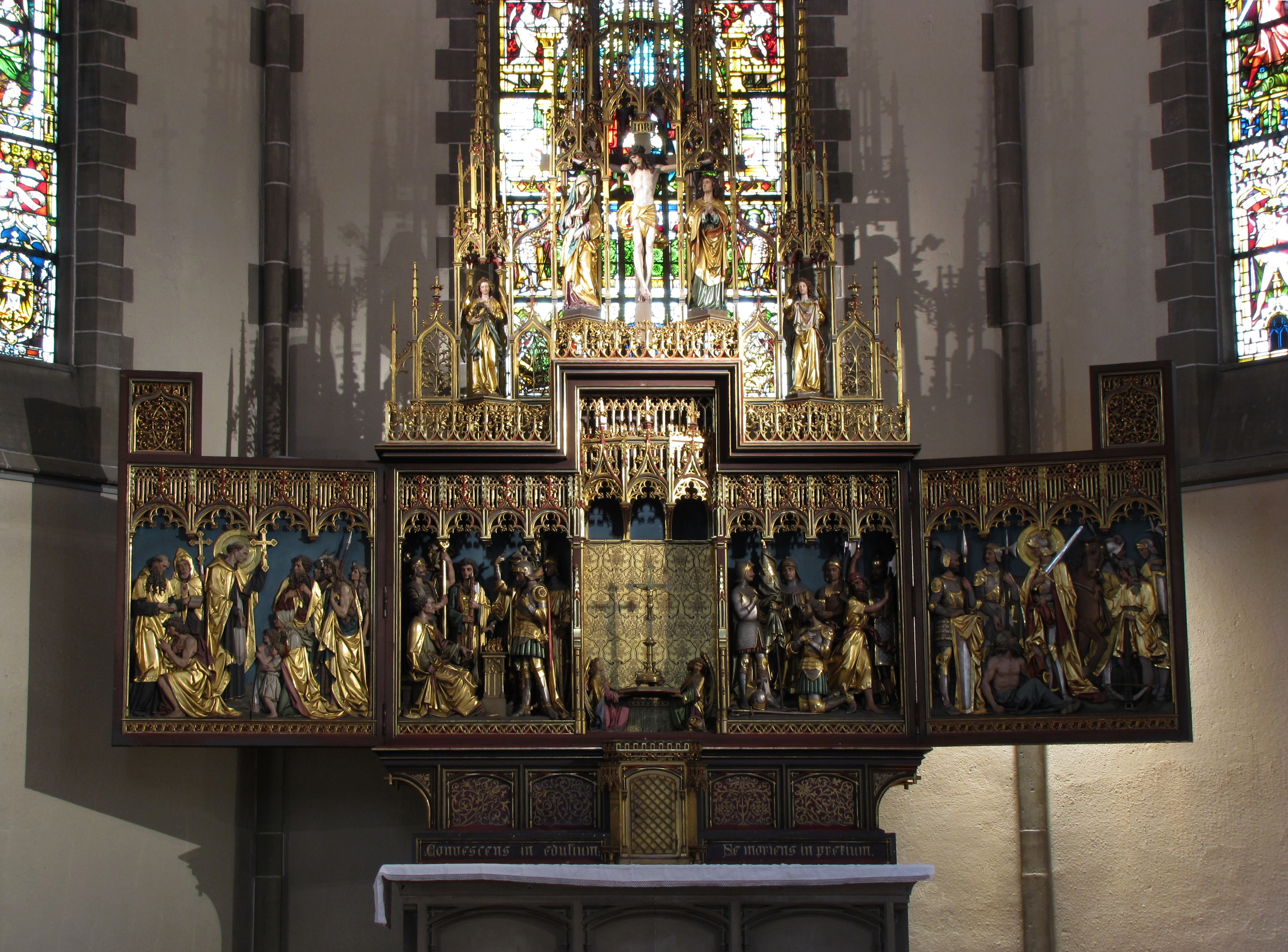
Main altar

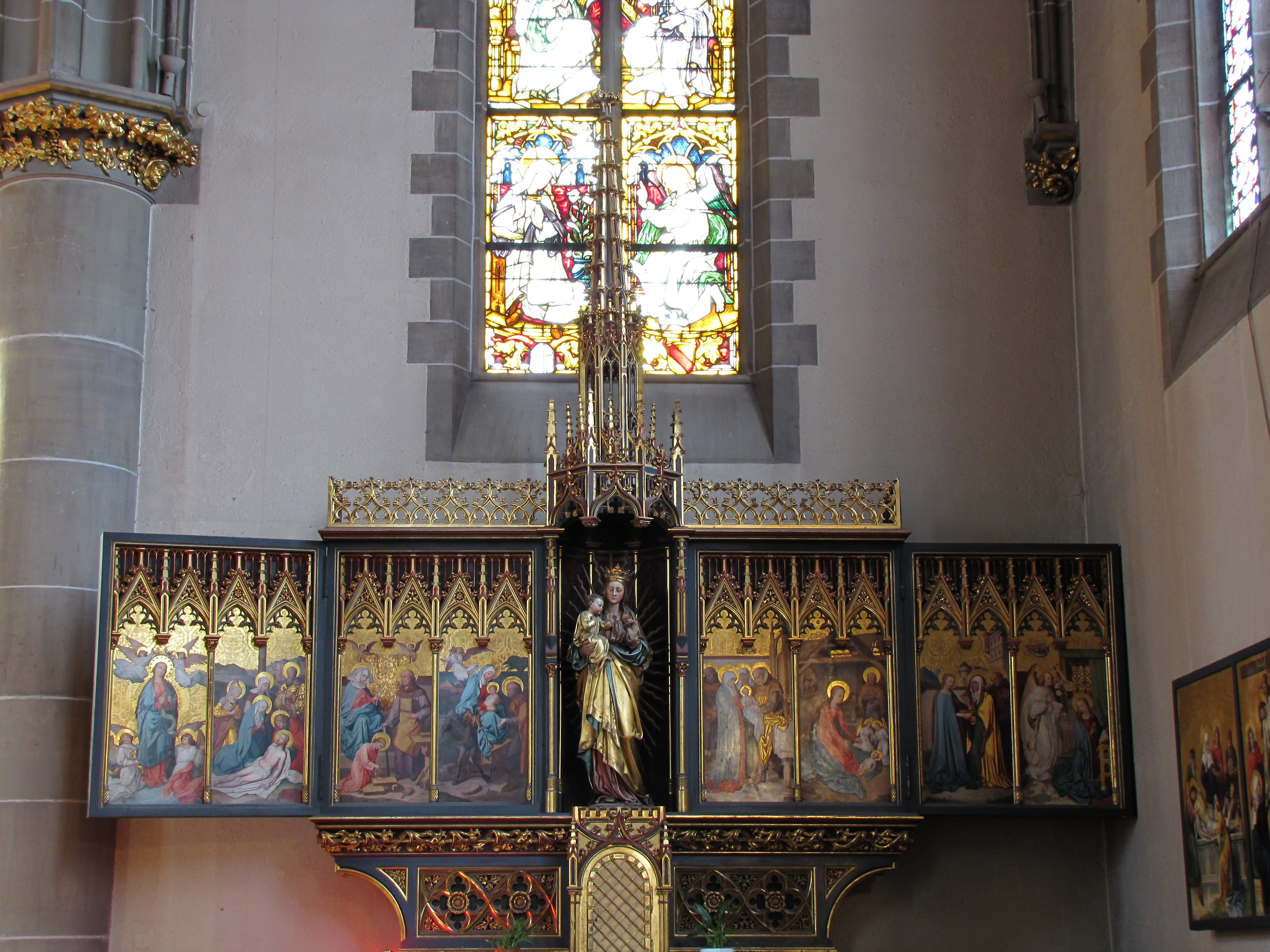
Lateral altar

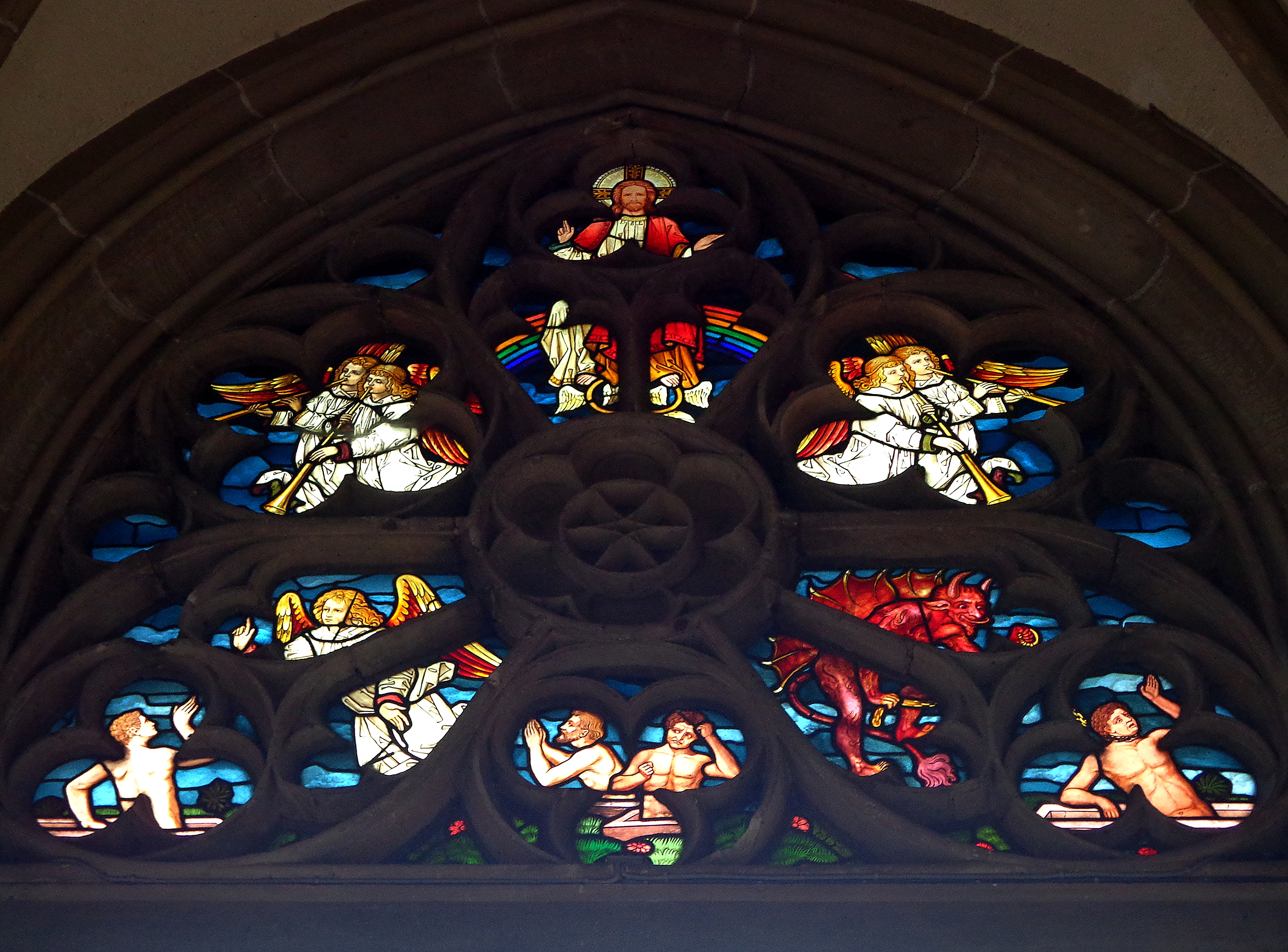
Stained glass window: Last Judgment

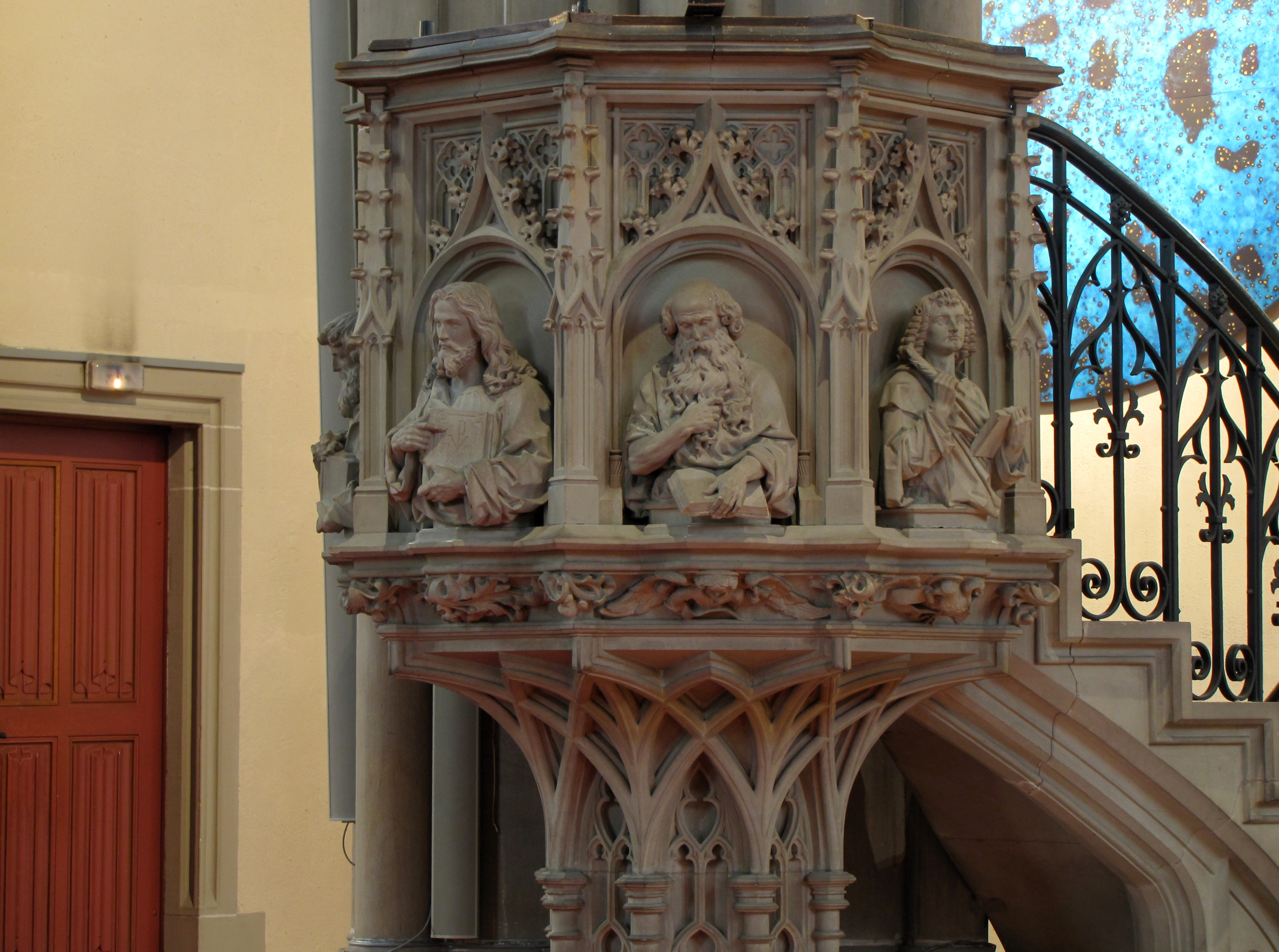
Pulpit

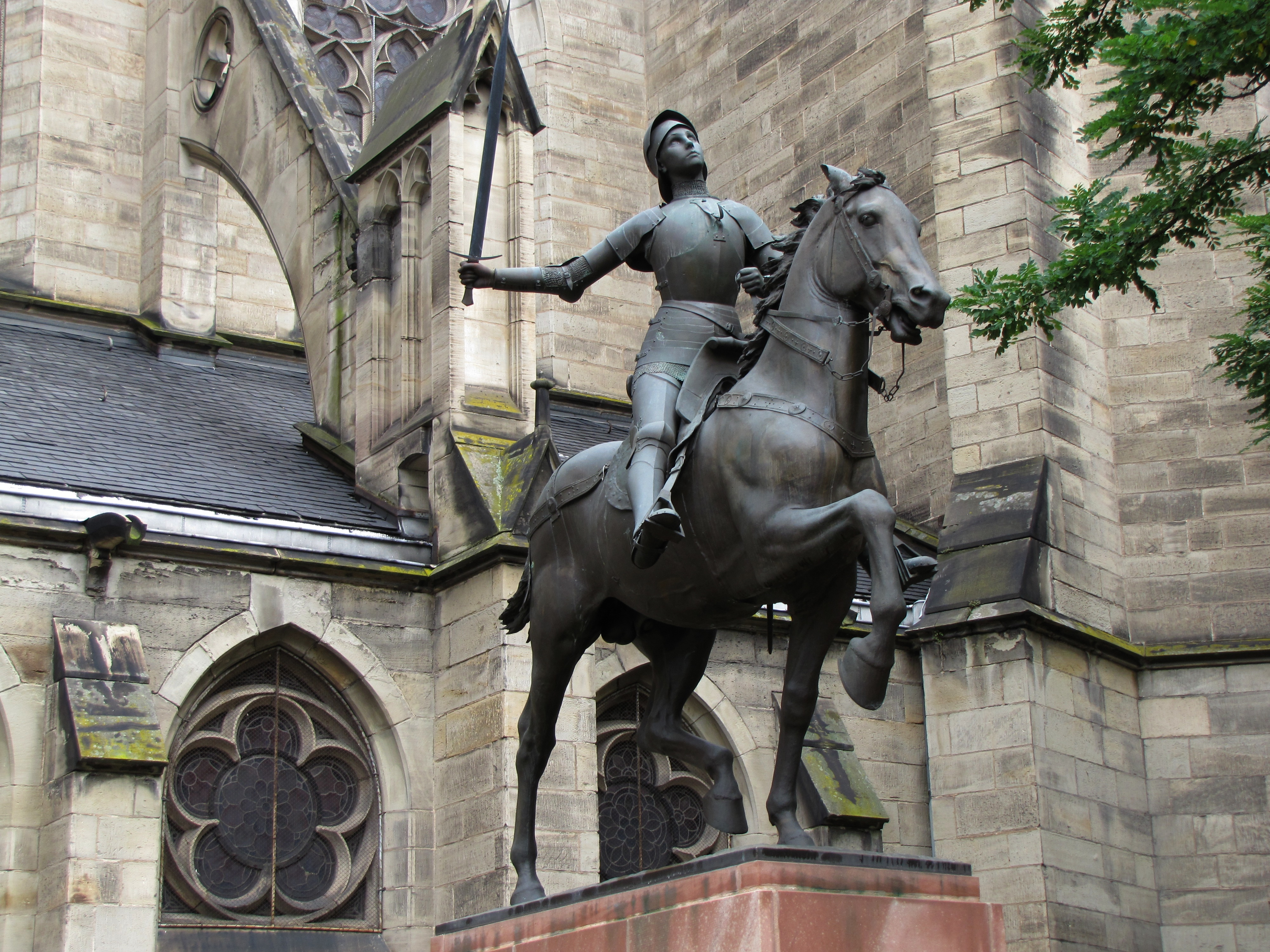
Equestrian statue of Joan of Arc

== Bibliography ==
- Suzanne Braun; Jacques Hampé (photographs); Victor Beyer (preface) (2002). "L'église Saint-Maurice". Églises de Strasbourg (in French). Strasbourg: Oberlin. pp. 188–193. ISBN 2-85369-237-X.
