= Equestrian statue of Joan of Arc (Paris) =

1889 sculpture by Paul Dubois in Paris

Joan of Arc
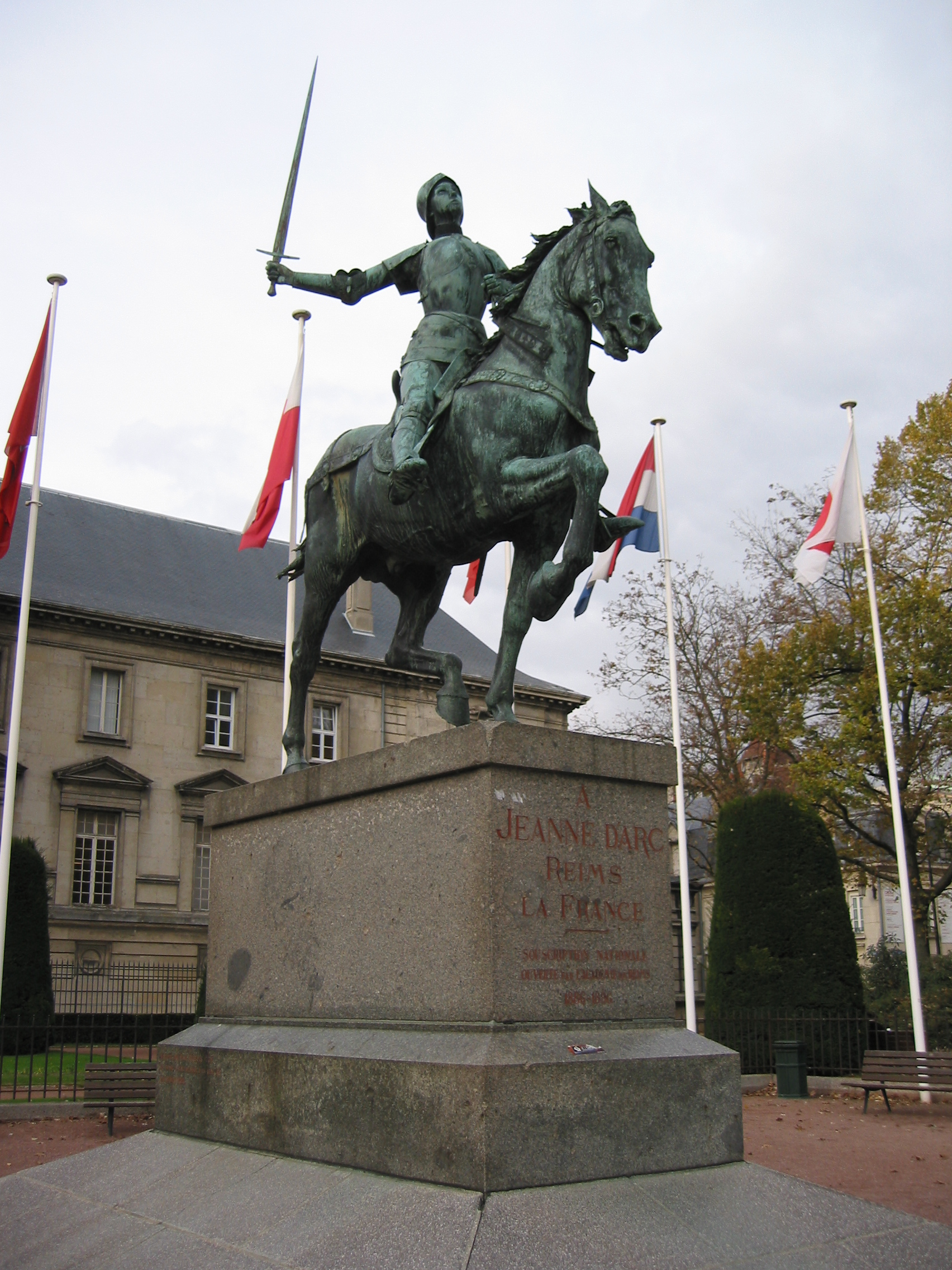
- Joan of Arc in Reims
- Artist: Paul Dubois
- Year: 1889 (plaster)
- Location: Paris, Reims, Strasbourg, Washington DC (casts)

Joan of Arc is a monumental bronze sculpture by French sculptor Paul Dubois. It depicts Joan of Arc both as a warrior and as a divinely inspired visionary.

The original plaster was presented at the Salon in 1889, on a commission by the city of Reims in 1887. Dubois donated it in 1902 to the Musée Paul-Dubois-Alfred Boucher in Nogent-sur-Seine, now an annex of the Musée Camille Claudel. An earlier plaster version is at the Ny Carlsberg Glyptotek in Copenhagen.

There are four casts of the sculpture in public settings:

- in front of Saint-Augustin Church in Paris (1895), cast by Edmond Gruet Jeune, purchased in 1895 by the Fine Arts Directorate of the French Government and placed on its current location in 1900;
- in front of Reims Cathedral (1896), cast by Pierre Bingen with finishings by Fonderie Thiébaut Frères, inaugurated by President Félix Faure on Bastille Day 1896;
- in front of St Maurice's Church, Strasbourg (1897), cast by E. Gruet Jeune, initially intended for the Musée du Luxembourg; then placed in Strasbourg in front of the Palais du Rhin in 1922, damaged by German occupation forces during World War II, and placed in its current location in 1965;
- on Meridian Hill Park (1922), reduced-scale cast by Rudier, inaugurated on January 6, 1922, in presence of President Warren G. Harding.

== Gallery ==
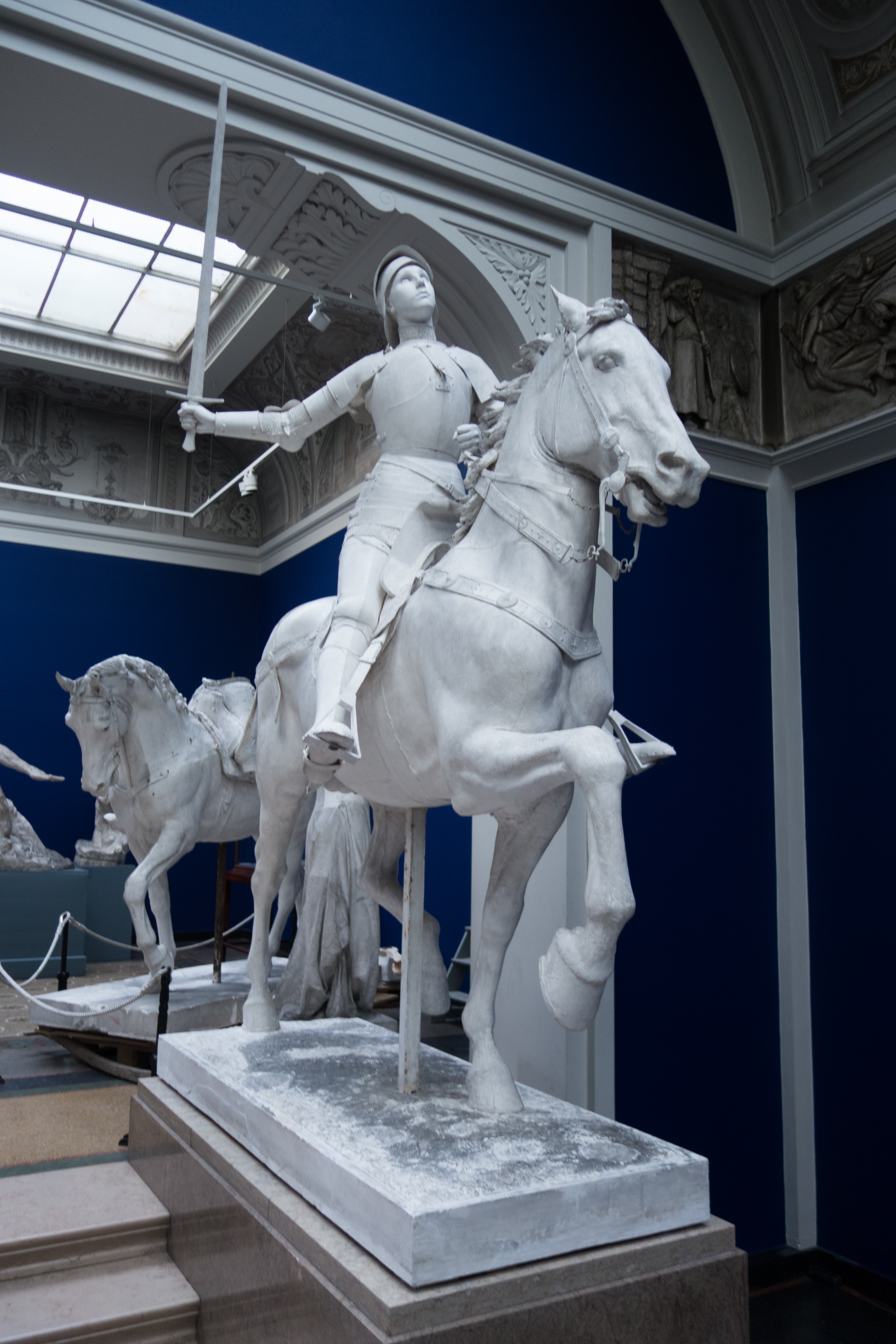
Non-final plaster version, at Ny Carlsberg Glyptotek

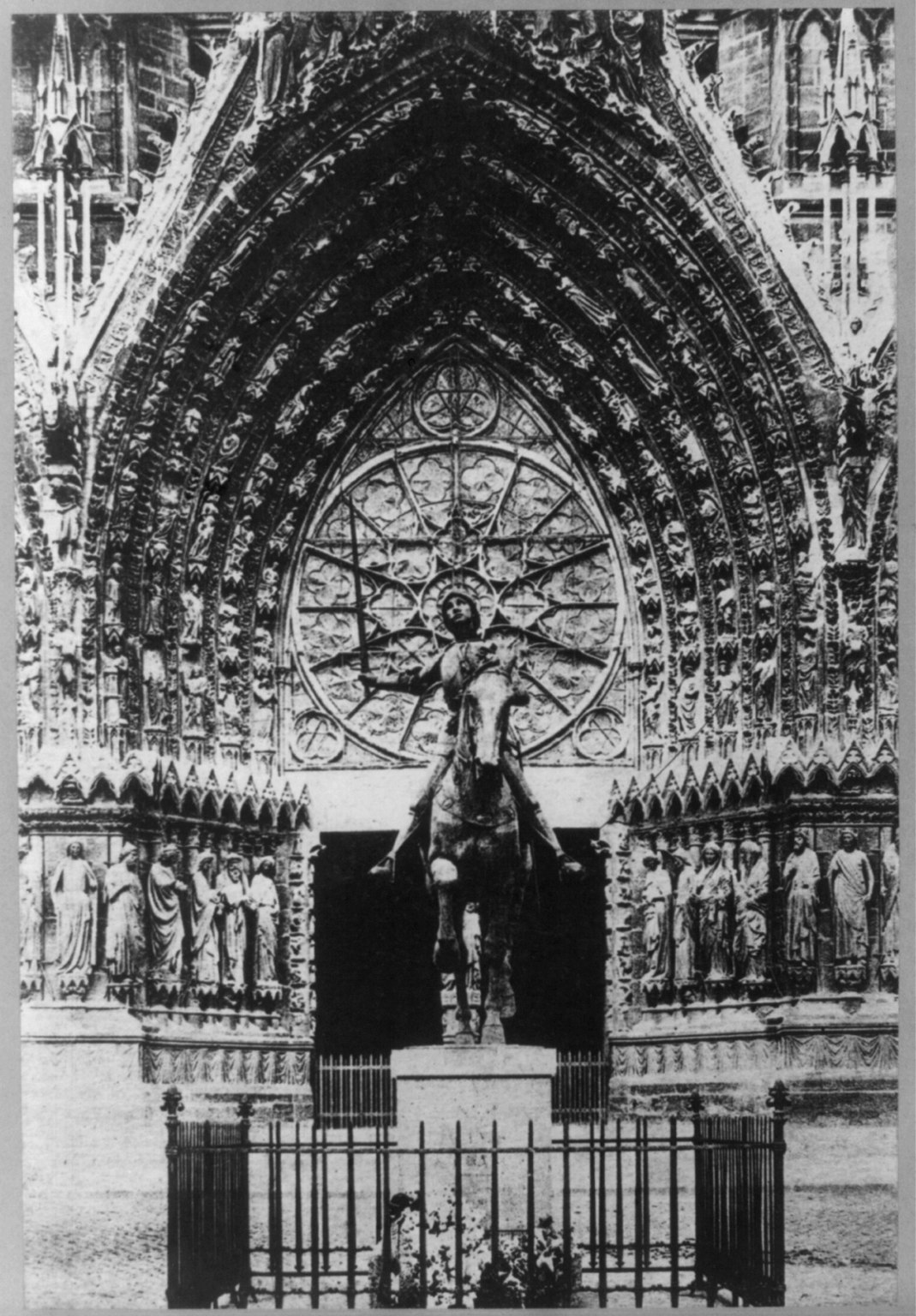
Reims: original placement, as if riding from the Cathedral

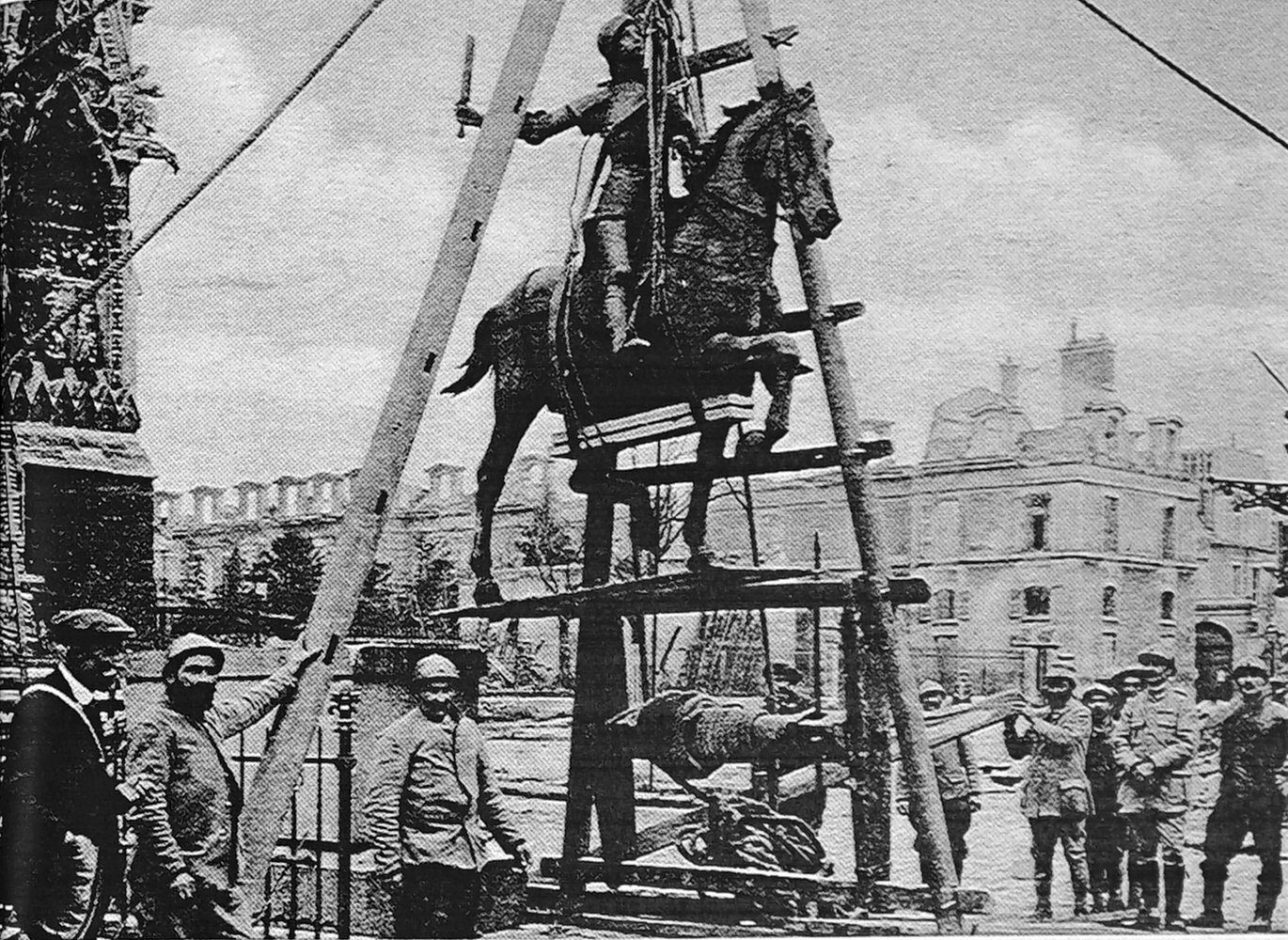
Reims: protection during World War I

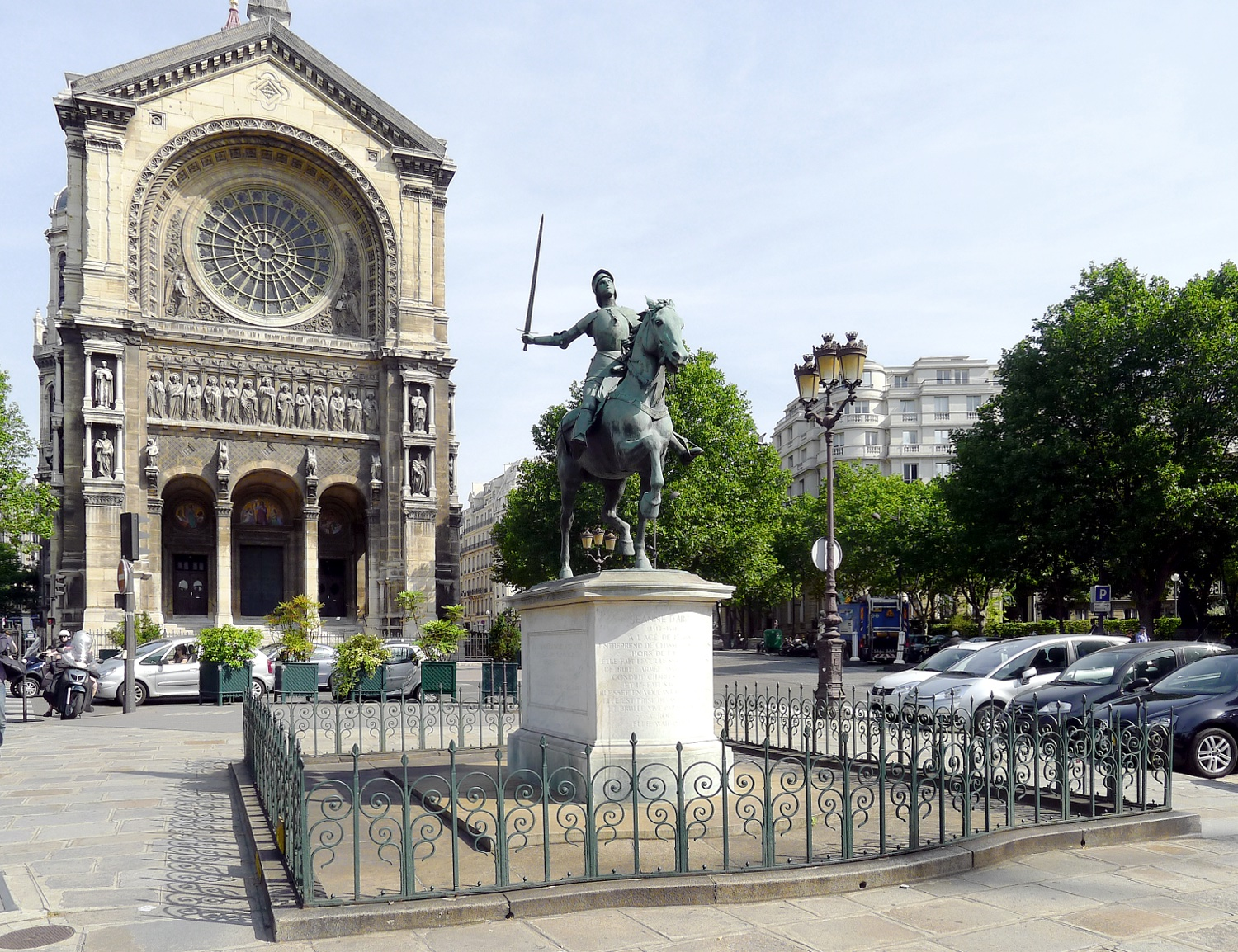
Paris: current position in front of Saint-Augustin Church

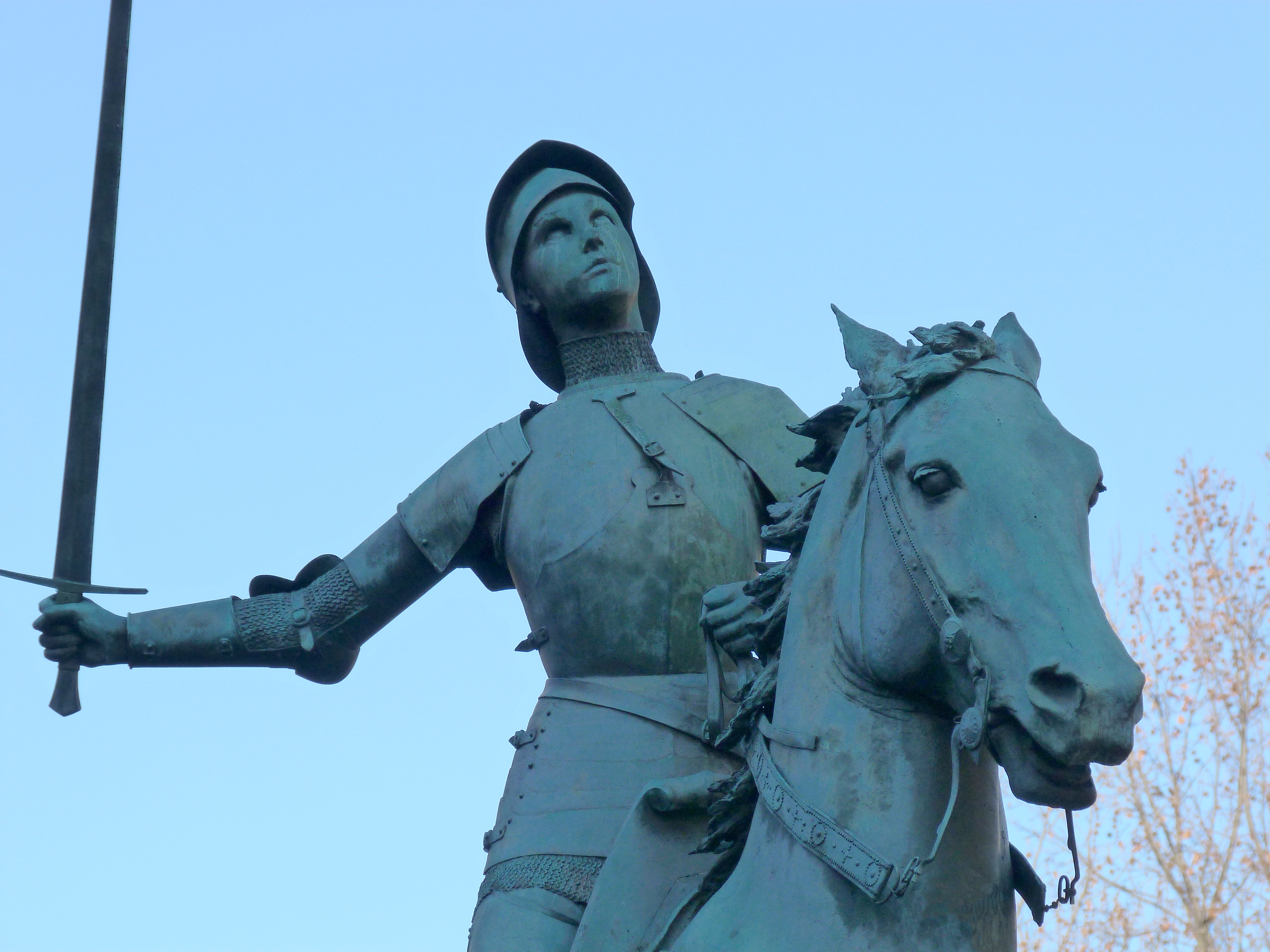
Paris: detail

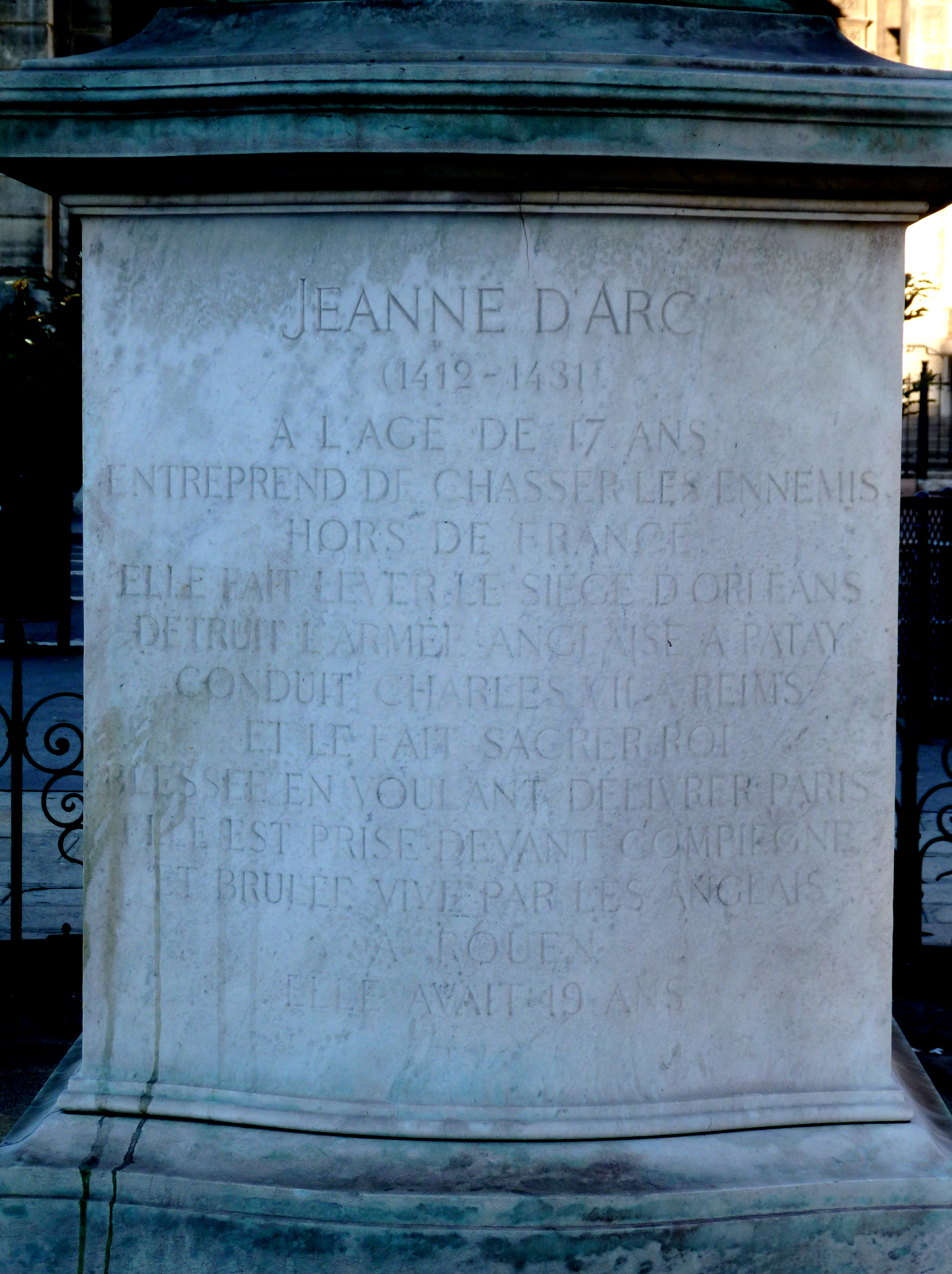
Paris: inscription on pedestal

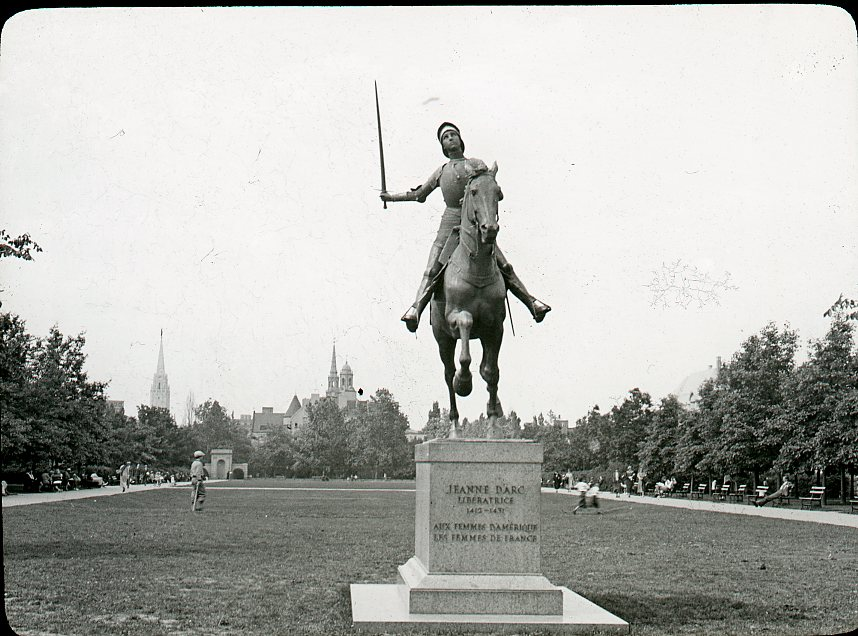
Washington: Meridian Hill Park
