= Friedrich Weigle =

German organ builder (1850–1906)

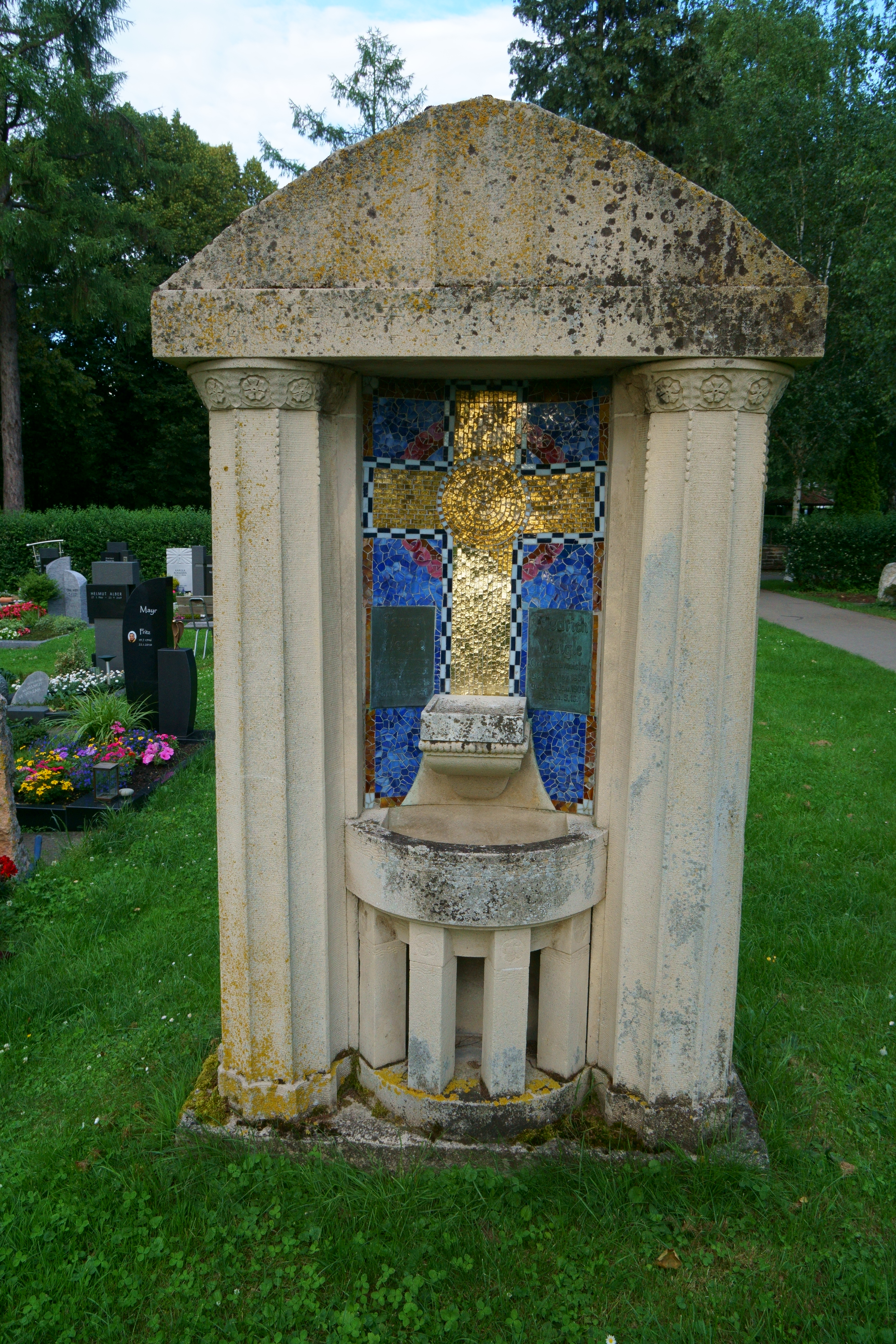
Gravestone for Friedrich Weigle and his wife Fanny.

Friedrich Weigle (17 November 1850 – 6 January 1906) was a German organ builder. His gravestone in the cemetery in Echterdingen shows the date of death as 19 January 1906.

== Life ==
Born in Ludwigsburg, Weigle took over his father's workshop Carl Gottlieb Weigle on 1 January 1880, which he moved from Stuttgart to Echterdingen in 1888. Before the turn of the century, organs had already been delivered to America, Africa and Asia. Around 1902, bankruptcy proceedings were underway against the company.

After his death, his sons Friedrich, Karl, Julius and Gotthold Weigle took over the company.

Weigl died in Stuttgart at the age of 71.

== Organ ==
- 1896–1944: Matthäuskirche Stuttgart-Heslach (op. 187).
- 1898: Schönborn/Rheinland (enlargement)
- 1899: St. Mauritius, Straßburg.
- 1904: Evangelische Kirche Wiesbaden-Igstadt.
- 1906–1979: evangelische Stadtkirche Lauterbach in Hessen.
