= Paul Dubois (sculptor) =

French sculptor and painter

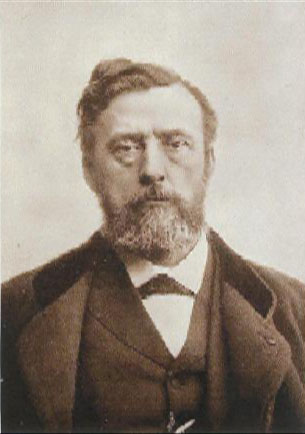
- Born: 18 July 1829; Nogent-sur-Seine, France
- Died: 23 May 1905 (aged 75)
- Known for: Sculpture and painter

Paul Dubois (French pronunciation: [pɔl dybwa]; 18 July 1829 – 23 May 1905, also known by Dubois-Pigalle) was a French sculptor and painter from Nogent-sur-Seine. His works were mainly sculptures and statues, and he was also a portrait painter.

== Early life ==
Paul Dubois was born on the 18 July 1829 in Nogent-sur-Seine, France. After his early education, he began studying law there to please his father who practiced as a notary.

He gave this up in order to train as a sculptor; his enthusiasm for this possibly fanned by the admiration he had for the work of his great-uncle Jean-Baptiste Pigalle. He moved to Paris to study this art. When making his debut at the Paris Salon at the Salon of 1857, he did so under the name Dubois-Pigalle.

== Career ==
In 1858 he entered the atelier of Armand Toussaint at the École Nationale des Beaux-Arts. The following year he travelled to Rome, studying and copying the many great sculptures and mixed with the likes of Henri Chapu, Alexandre Falguière and Georges Bizet. As an artist he did not have to struggle with financial problems as his family supported all his studies. He stayed in Rome for 4 years and whilst in Rome he executed the works Saint Jean-Baptiste and Narcisse and, in 1863, was awarded "une médaille de 2° classe" by the Paris Salon for work sent to Paris from Rome. When he returned to France he completed the study of a young troubadour, Chanteur florentin du XVe siècle, a work which was to bring him such popular success.

In 1865 and 1876, he was awarded a médaille d'honneur at the Salon des beaux-arts. In June 1867 he was named Chevalier (Knight) of the Légion d'honneur; in July 1874 he was named Officer of the Légion d'honneur; in July 1886 he was promoted to Commander of the Légion d'honneur; and in 1889 he was decorated with the Grand Croix (Grand Cross) of the Légion d'honneur.

His success was not limited to sculpture and as a painter he was in much demand for portraits and after 1870 he gave as much time and effort to his painting as to his sculpture. He also taught at the Académie Julian. Dubois died from pneumonia in 1905.

== Main works ==
| Name | Location | Date | Notes |
|---|---|---|---|
| The tomb of Paul Baudry | Cimetiere du Pere Lachaise.Paris | | This tomb was designed by Ambroise Baudry, Paul Baudry's brother. Dubois executed the bust of Baudry on the monument whilst Antonin Mercié added two bronze compositions, one representing "Douleur" or grief and another depicting a woman who goes to place a crown of laurels on Baudry's bust. Sculpture on Paul Baudry grave |
| Bust of Joseph Parrot | Académie de Médecine.Paris | | This bronze bust by Dubois is located in the Académie de Médecine in the rue Bonaparte in Paris. |
| Bust of Henri d'Orléans, Duke of Aumale | Musée Condé in Chantilly | | Dubois' bust of the Duke of Aumale is held in the Musée Condé in Chantilly. |
| Mantelpiece ornamentation-medallion representing "Charity" | Musée d'Orsay | 1878 | Dubois received the commission from the Durand-Dassier family in Bordeaux. The plaster model of the medallion is held by Troyes' Musée des Beaux-Arts. |
| Madame de Raineville | Musée d'Orsay | | A terracotta bust by Dubois is held in the Musée d'Orsay. |
| Eve naissante | Paris | | Dubois executed the work entitled Eve naissante which can be seen in the Petit Palais in Paris. |
| Saint Jean-Baptiste enfant | | | Dubois executed a plaster version of this composition in 1861 whilst in Rome and presented it to the Paris Salon in 1863. The bronze version cast by Thiébault is held in the Musée des Beaux-Arts in Troyes. |
| The composition Narcisse | | 1867 | The Musée d'Orsay holds a marble version of Dubois' Narcisse. Dubois originally composed the piece in plaster whilst in Rome in 1862. The second marble version decorates the façade of the Louvre Palace. The Musée d'Orsay copy was executed for the Exposition Universelle of 1867. Dubois submitted the plaster version to the Paris Salon of 1863 from where it was purchased by the State. It had been awarded a "médaille de 2e classe". There is another plaster copy in the Musée de Nogent-sur-Seine and another replica in the Ny Carlsberg Glyptotek in Copenhagen. Narcisse by Paul Dubois. A marble version decorates the façade of the Louvre in Paris and another is at the Musée d'Orsay |
| Equestrian statue of Joan of Arc | Paris | | This statue by Dubois is located in Paris' place Saint- Augustin. There is a bronze version cast by Bingen in front of Reims cathedral and another in Washington cast by Rudier. There were several limited editions of the work cast by various foundries so the piece is very well known. There is also a copy of this statue in Strasbourg, this cast by the founders E.Gruet Jne. It is located in the place Arnold in Strasbourg. The plaster version was submitted to the Paris Salon in 1889 and this is held by the Musée Paul Dubois-Alfred Boucher. Several Dubois sketches of the proposed work are held in the Louvre and models are held in the Musée des Beaux-arts, Troyes and Ny Carlsberg Glyptothek in Copenhagen. |
| Le Chant | Paris | | Paul Dubois’ sculpture, Le Chant, was erected on the main facade of the Opéra Garnier building between 1860 and 1869. Positioned just above Le Chant is Charles-Alphonse-Achille Gumery's medallion of Giovanni Battista Pergolèse an Italian composer, violinist and organist and one of the most important early figures in "opera buffa" (comic opera). |
| Bust Louis Pasteur | | 1877 | This work was presented to the Paris Salon in 1880. A copy can be seen in Dole and the original plaster model is held by the Musée Paul Dubois-Alfred Boucher. |
| Equestrian statue of Anne de Montmorency | Château de Chantilly | 1886 | This work was commissioned by the Duke of Aumale. The inscription reads "HIC STAT PRO AEDIBUS SUIS RENOVATIS ANNAS MOMORANTIUS MAGISTER EQUITUM PRIMUS SAE GENTIS DUX ET PAR FRANCIAE GALLICUS CONCTATOR COGNOMINATUS QUI IN MULTIS SAUCIUS PRAELIIS VITAM VITRAQUE FORTUNA MIRE INSEGNEM COMINUS PUGNANS FINIVIT; DIE XII NOVEMB.A.D.MDLX VII AETATIS LXXIV; POSITA EST EFFIGIES A.D.MDCCCLXXXVI" |
| Bust of Camille Saint-Saëns | Musée d'Orsay | | This bust by Dubois is held in the Musée d'Orsay. |
| The monument to General de La Moricière | Nantes | 1866 | The cenotaph in Nantes' cathedral to General Christophe Léon Louis Juchault de Lamoricière was erected following a subscription raised in 1866. The architect was Louis Philippe François Boitte and the sculptor Moisseron, with Dubois being commissioned to execute the four allegorical statues representing Charity, Military Courage, Faith and Wisdom which are positioned at each corner of the monument. These four works in bronze were intended to represent de La Moricière's perceived virtues. A woman with a small child on her knee represents "Charity" whilst the depiction of an old man deep in thought represents "Wisdom". At the opposite corners, Dubois illustrates "Faith" with the depiction of a young woman clasping her hands in a gesture of prayer whilst to her left we see a warrior representing "Military courage". In these four studies, Dubois shows the lessons he had learned in Italy and the reason that his work is so often described as "neo-florentine". Below is a photograph of the statue representing "military courage". The allegorical statue representing "Military courage". One of the four statues at each corner of the cenotaph to General de La Moricière in Nantes cathedral. A good example of Dubois' "neo-florentine" style |
| Victory medal for Belgium | | | Dubois' composition "Allégorie de la Victoire" was used for this Belgian Médaille de la Victoire 1914–1918. The inscription on the medal reads "LA GRANDE GUERRE POUR LA CIVILISATION / DE GROTE OORLOG DE BESCHAVING" |
| Chanteur florentin du XVe siècle | | 1865 | This is one of Paul Dubois' best known works and the Musée d'Orsay hold a version in bronze cast by Maison Barbedienne. It depicts a Florentine singer of the 15th century. The version in Orsay is 1.55 metres high. Dubois had put the plaster version of the work in the Paris Salon exhibition of 1865 and it had won him a "médaille d'honneur". Initially the plaster version was held in Troyes' Musée des Beaux-Arts. The work has been reproduced many times and the Ny Carlsberg Glyptotek in Copenhagen hold a slightly different model. Dubois' widow gave a plaster version of the work to the Musée de Nogent-sur-Seine in 1905. Barbedienne produced limited editions in six different sizes between 1865 and 1953 and the Sèvres factory produced versions in biscuit in three different sizes. It is therefore a work often seen in France and it was exhibited at the Exposition Universelle in Paris in 1867 and 1889. Chanteur florentin du XVe siècle by Paul Dubois |
| Vierge à l'Enfant | Nogent-sur-Seine | 1866 | This Dubois sculpture is located in the Église Saint-Laurent in Nogent-sur-Seine. It was a gift to the church from Dubois himself. The original marble version is kept in the Église de la Trinité in Paris (chapelle de la Vierge). |
| Le Souvenir | | 1905 | This is another well known work of Dubois where the Musée d'Orsay hold a version, this in bronze and cast by Bingen et Costenoble. It was executed in 1905 by Dubois and laments the loss to France of both Alsace and Lorraine following the Franco-Prussian war of 1870. The work depicts two women, the one consoling the other and representing Alsace and Lorraine. It was in fact part of a major composition "Monument du Génie de la France" conceived by Dubois in the final years of his life and the only part of that composition completed. A wax version had been shown at the Paris Salon in 1899 and was purchased by the French State. Various plaster versions were produced and a bronze version was erected in Nancy's place Saint-Jean in 1910. Souvenir, Alsace-Lorraine by Paul Dubois. Statue stands in place Saint-Jean in Nancy. Allegories of Alsace and Lorraine console each other. The work mourns the loss to France of Alsace and Lorraine following the 1870 war with Prussia. |
| Buste Feminin | Troyes | | This work by Dubois is held by the Musée d'art, d'archéologie et de sciences naturelles in Troyes. |
| Bust of Louis Pasteur | Arbois | | This Dubois work in plaster can be seen in the Musée Sarret de Grozon in Arbois. |
| Tomb of Henri Eugene Philippe Louis, Duc d'Aumale | | | Dubois was responsible for the sculpture on the tomb of Henri Eugene Philippe Louis, Duc d'Aumale in the Chapelle Royale. |
| La Douleur. Sculptural composition for the tomb of his father | Nogent-sur-Seine | | His father is buried in the Nogent-sur-Seine cemetery and Dubois executed the composition La Douleur for the tomb. |

== Le musée Camille Claudel (ex Dubois-Boucher) ==
This museum was established by Dubois and Alfred Boucher and holds information relating to Dubois.

== Gallery of images ==
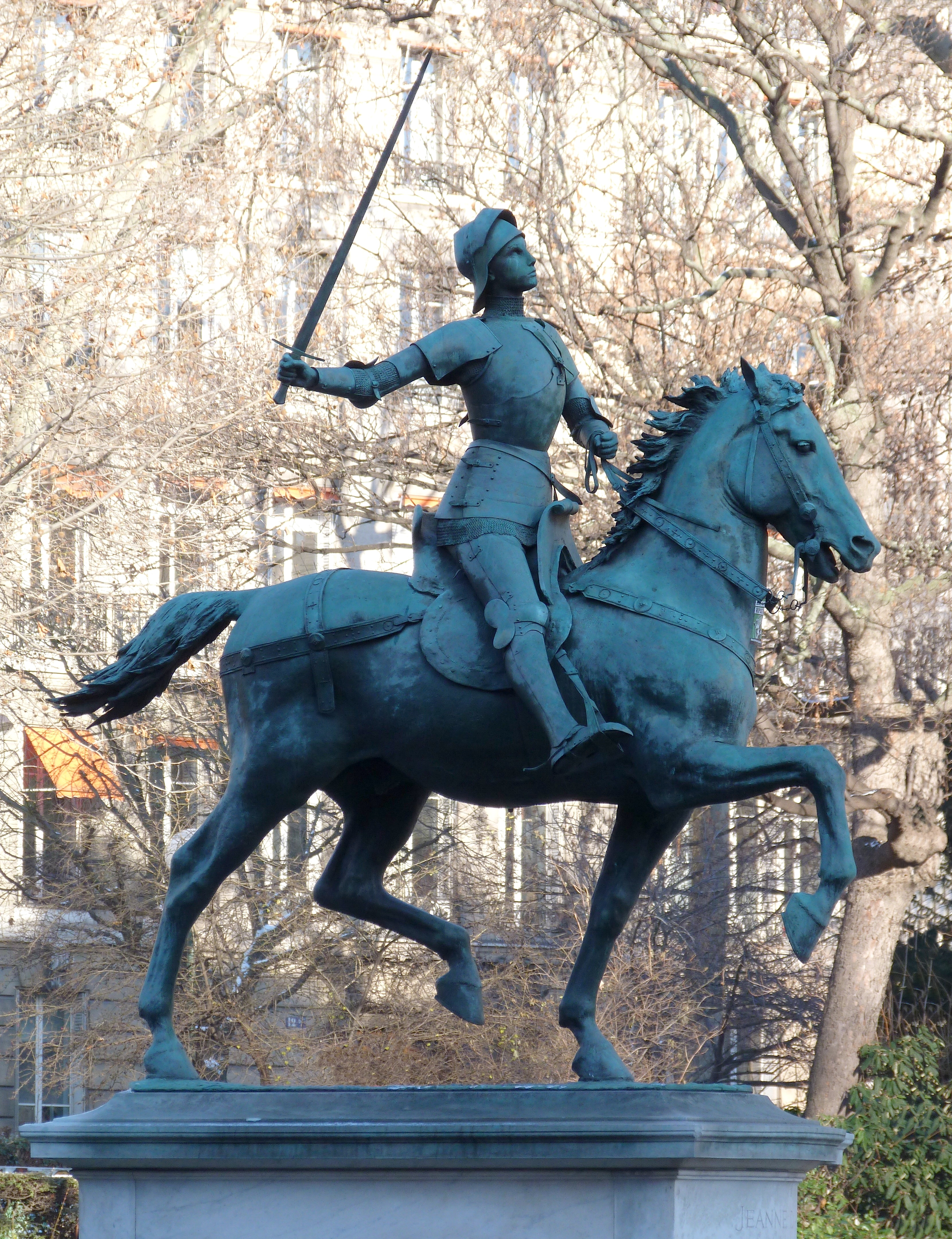
Statue of Joan of Arc, Place Saint Augustin, Paris

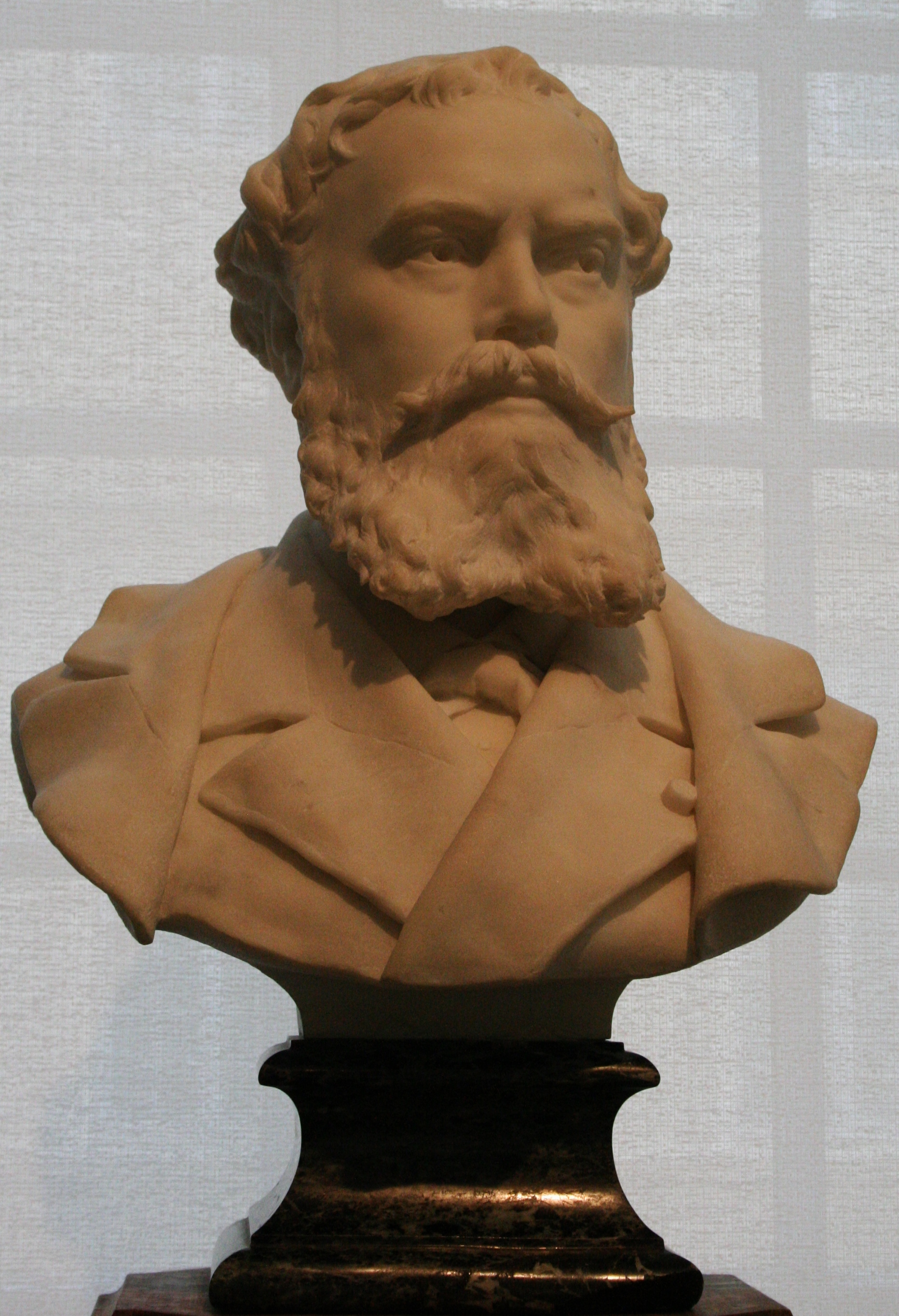
Bust in marble of the painter Alexandre Cabanel

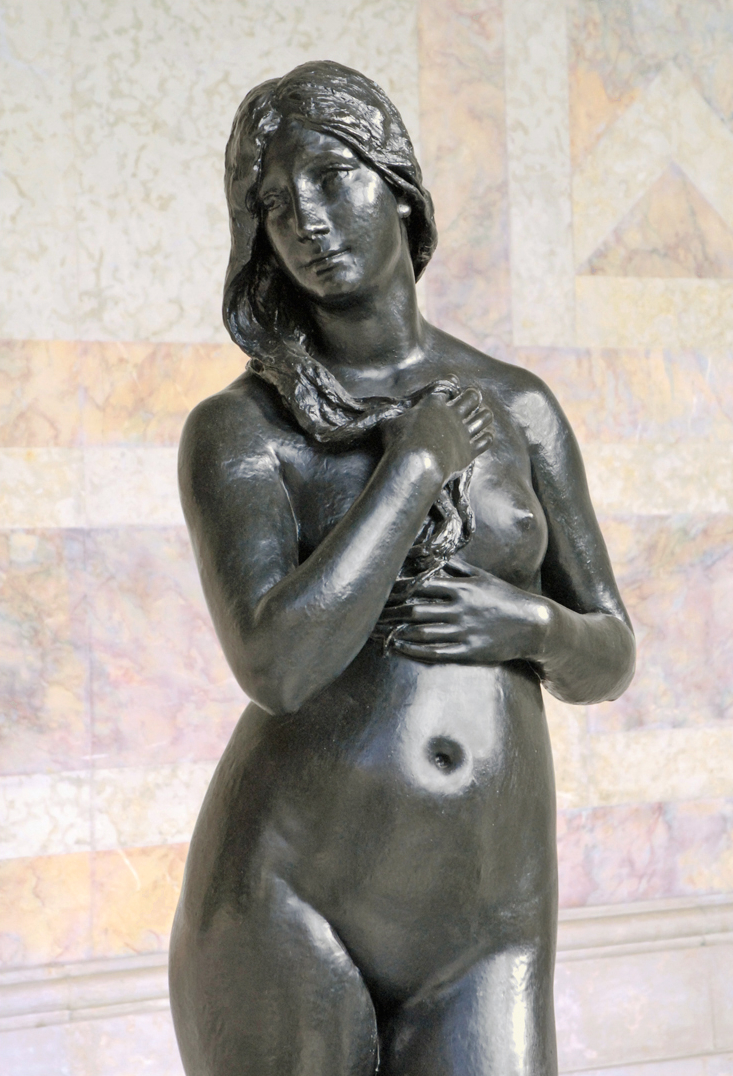
Ève naissante, Petit Palais, Paris

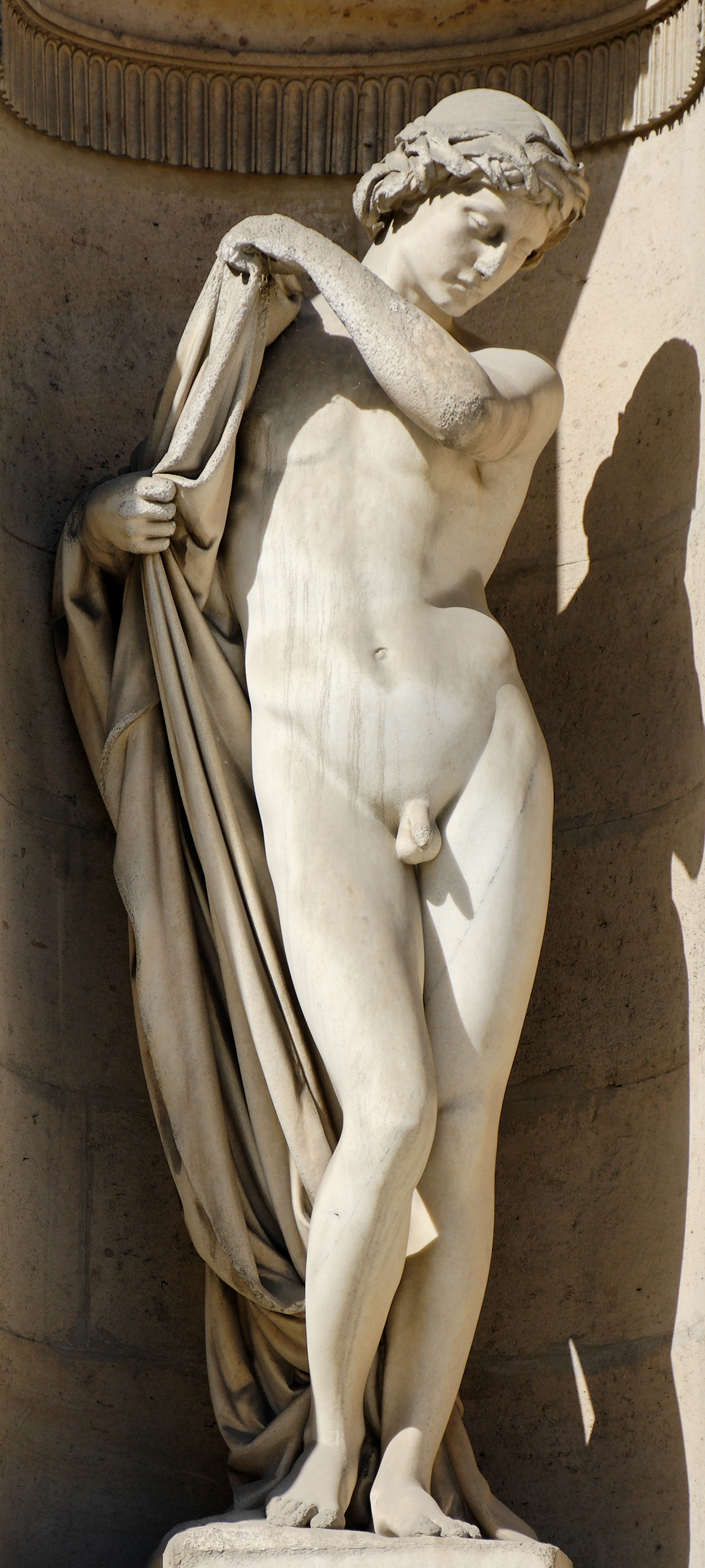
Narcissus (1866), by Paul Dubois. On the north façade of the Cour Carrée in the Louvre Palace, Paris.

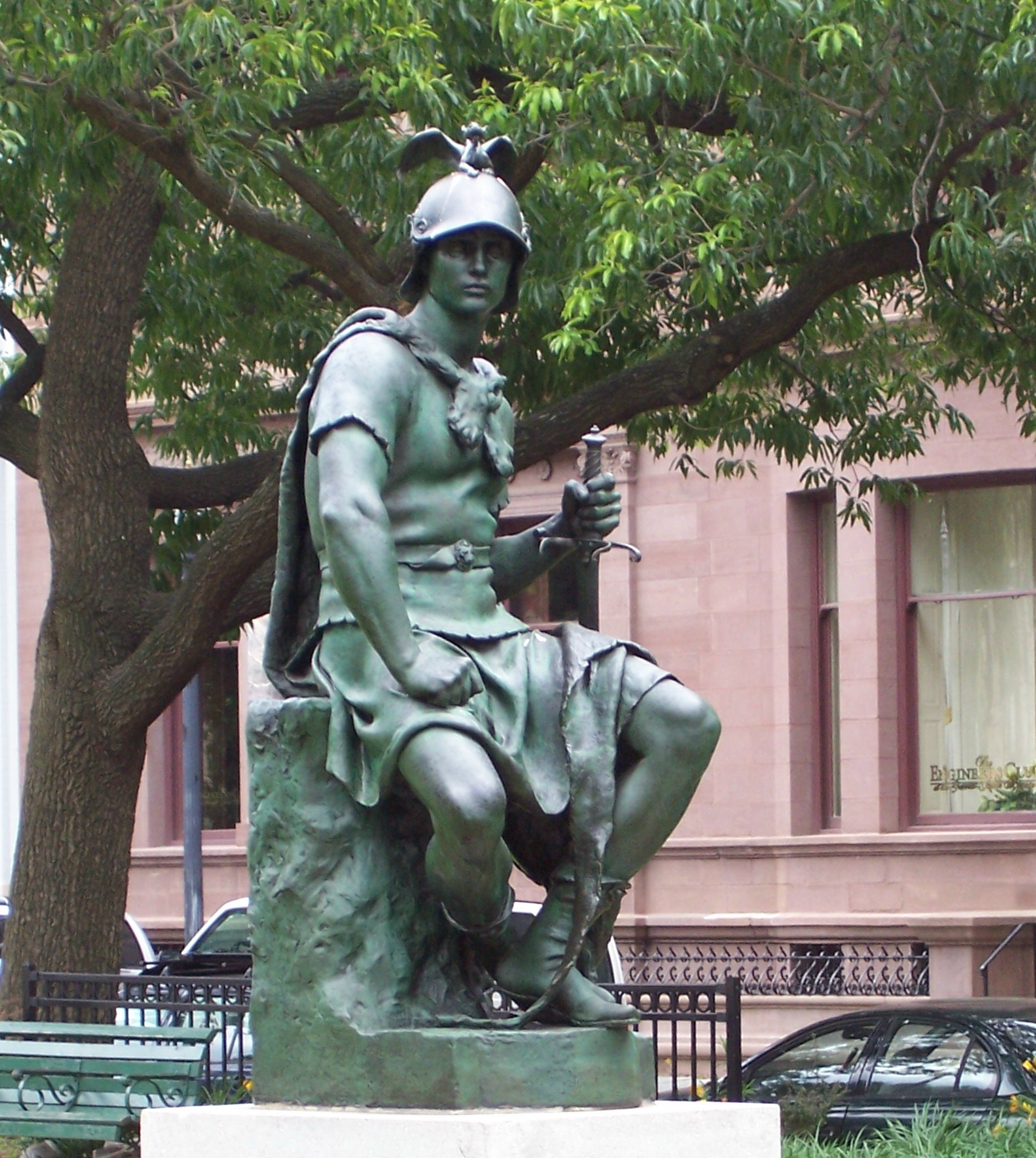
Military Courage reproduction, Mount Vernon, Baltimore

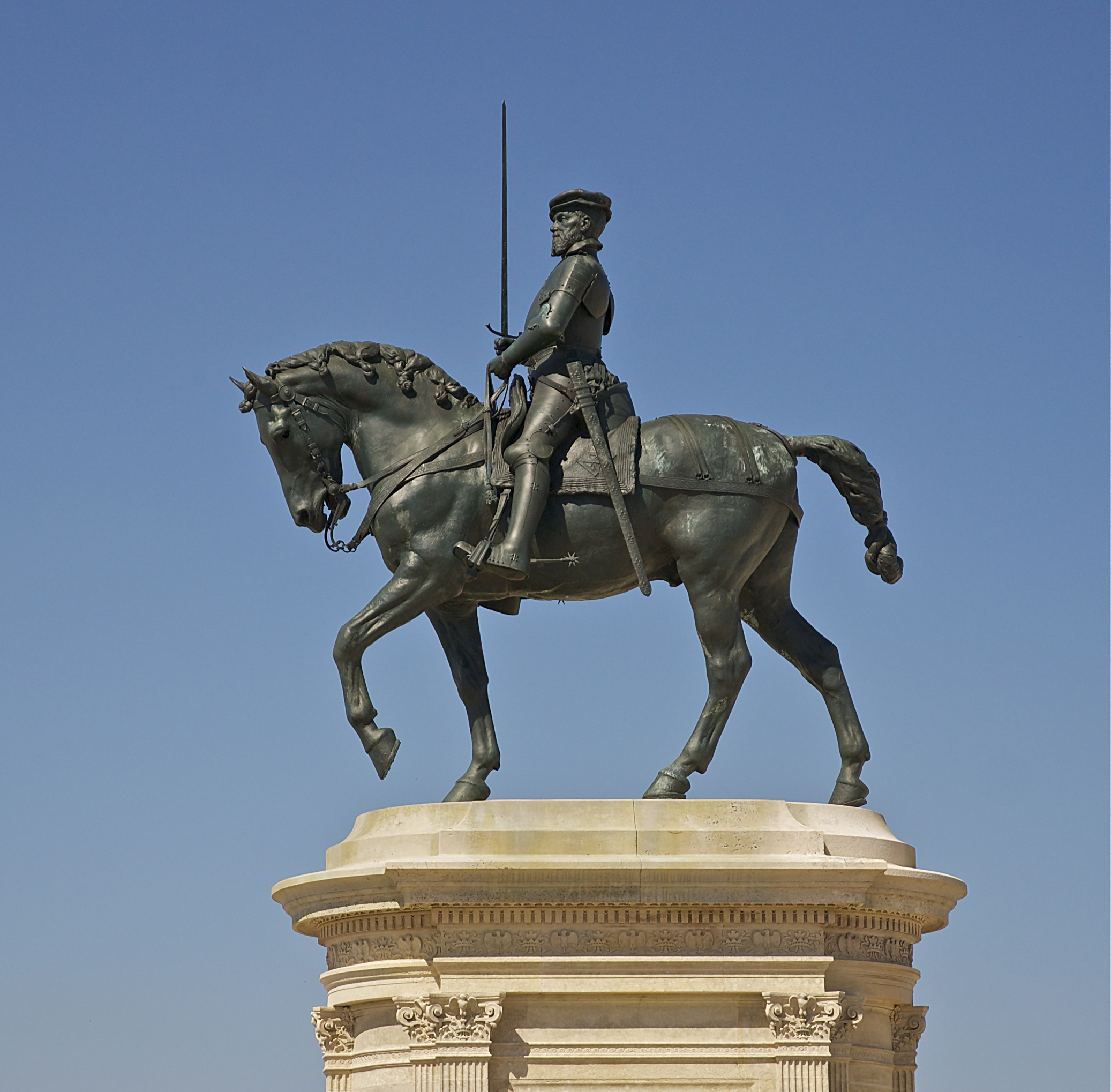
Equestrian statue of Anne de Montmorency in the Château de Chantilly

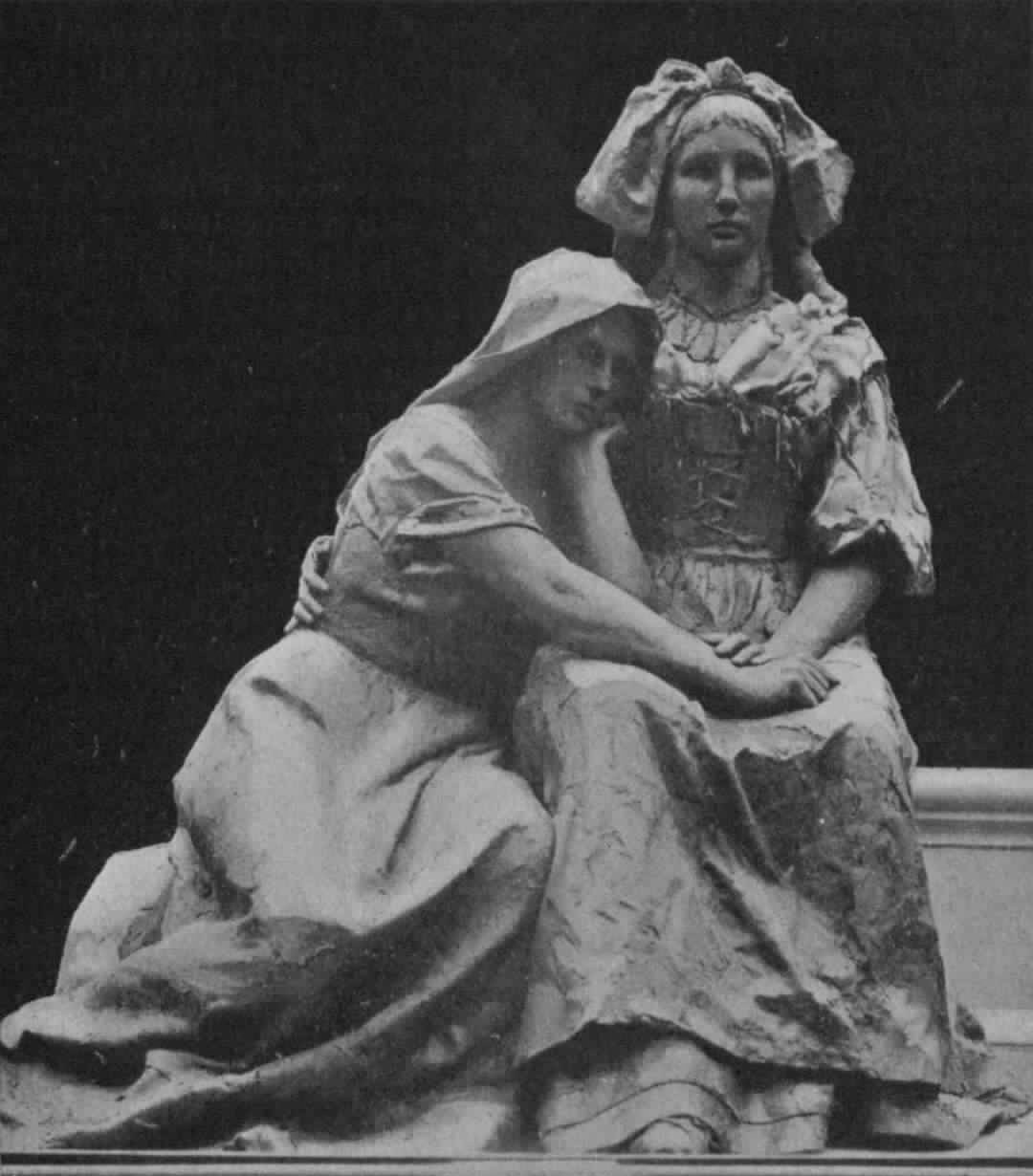
Photograph of Dubois' wax maquette of Le Souvenir submitted to the Salon des artistes français in 1899. The work mourns the loss of Alsace and Lorraine following the 1870 war with Prussia.

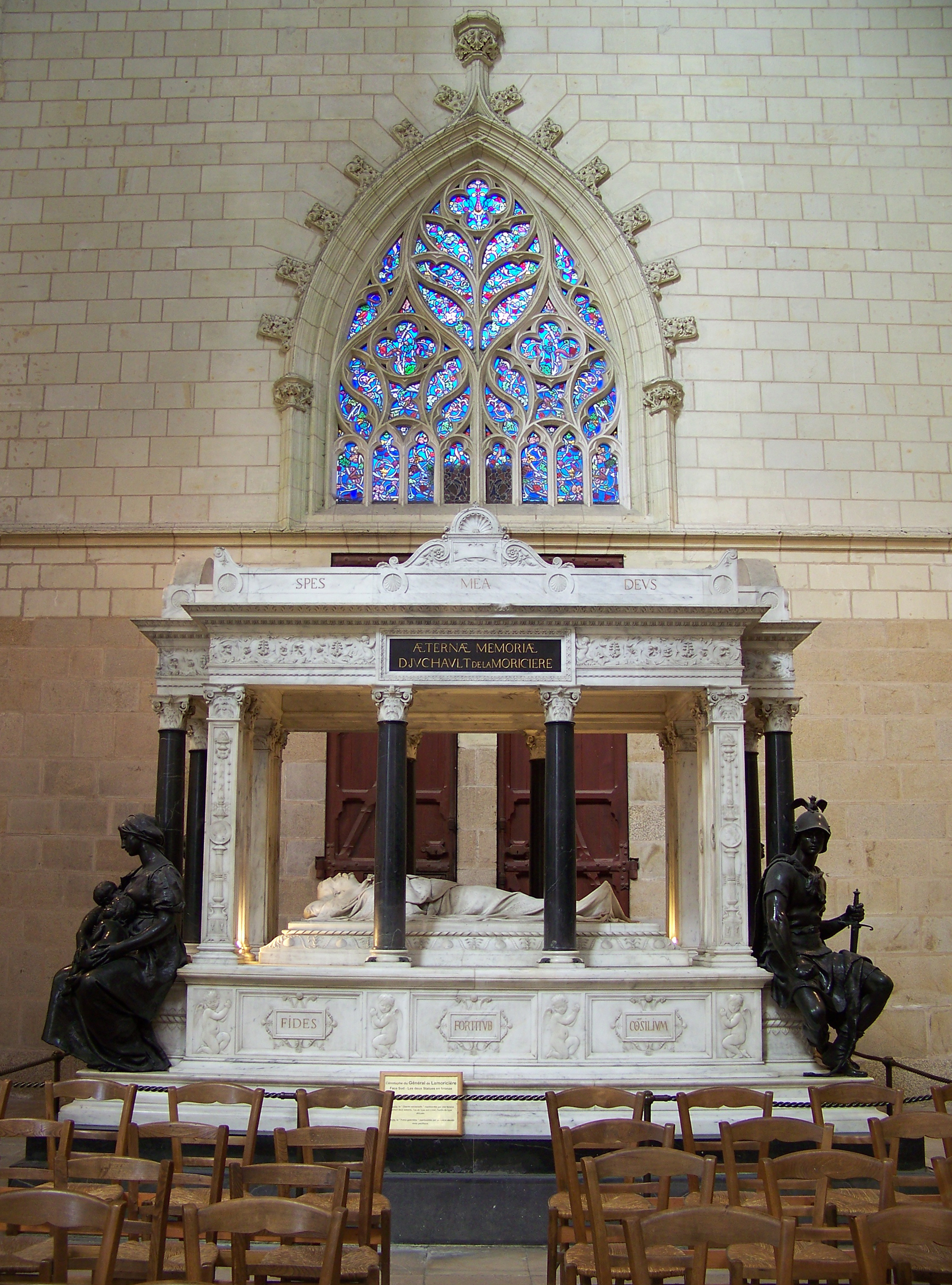
The monument/cenotaph to General de La Moricière in Nantes Cathedral
