= Two Men Reading =

Public artwork in Washington D.C, US

Coordinates: 38.926°N 77.022°W

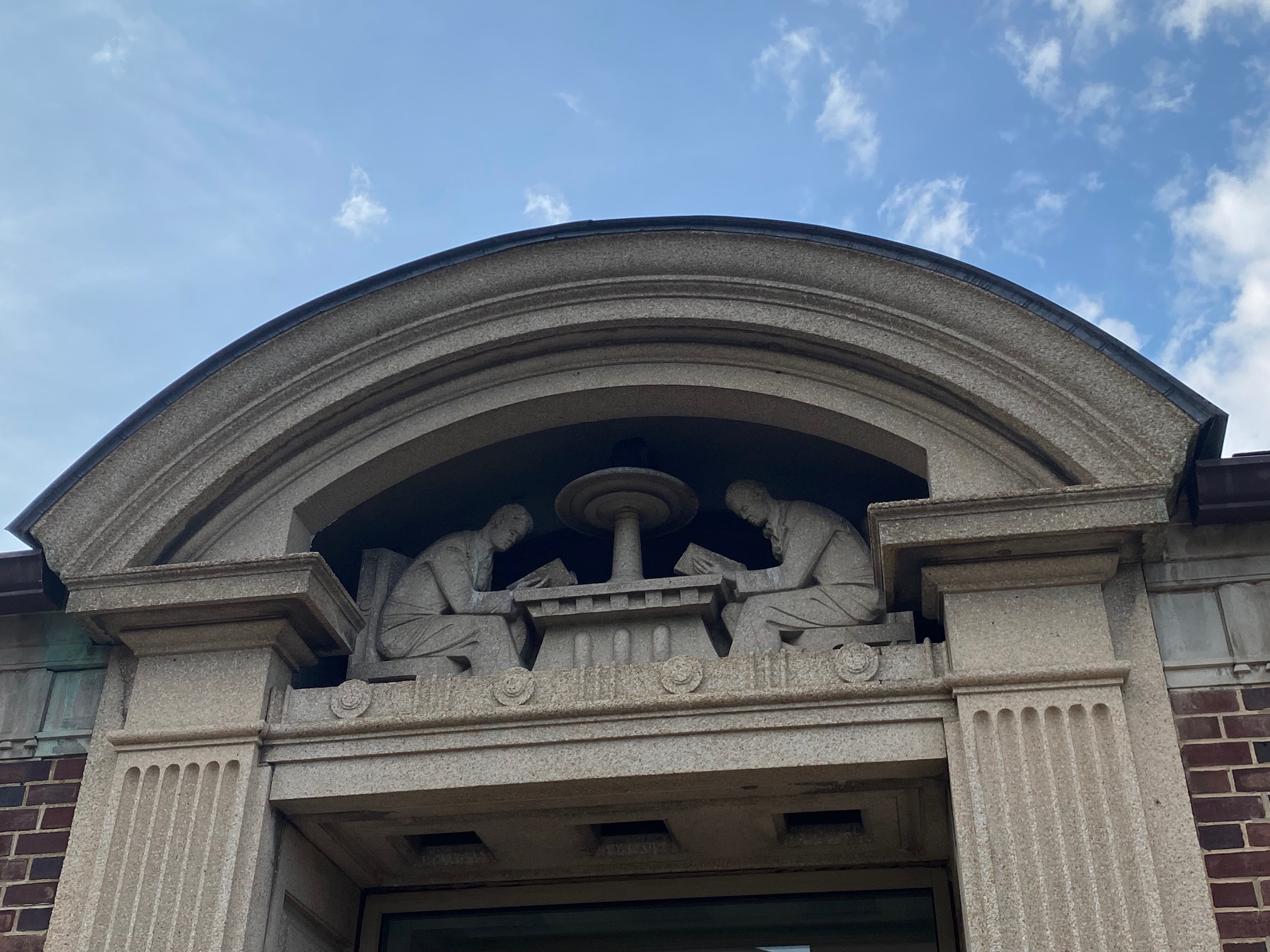
- Artist: Unknown
- Type: Stone
- Location: Washington, D.C.
- Owner: Howard University

Two Men Reading, is a public artwork by an unknown artist, located over the entrance of 601 Fairmont Street, N.W. on the Howard University campus in Washington, D.C., United States. Two Men Reading was originally surveyed as part of the Smithsonian's Save Outdoor Sculpture! survey in 1993.

== Description ==
A stone relief that shows two men sitting on chairs across a table from one another. The men are each reading a book and a large lamp sits on the table between the two men. The relief was installed in a semicircular space above the entrance to the building.

== Condition ==
This sculpture was surveyed in 1993 for its condition and it was described as "well maintained".
