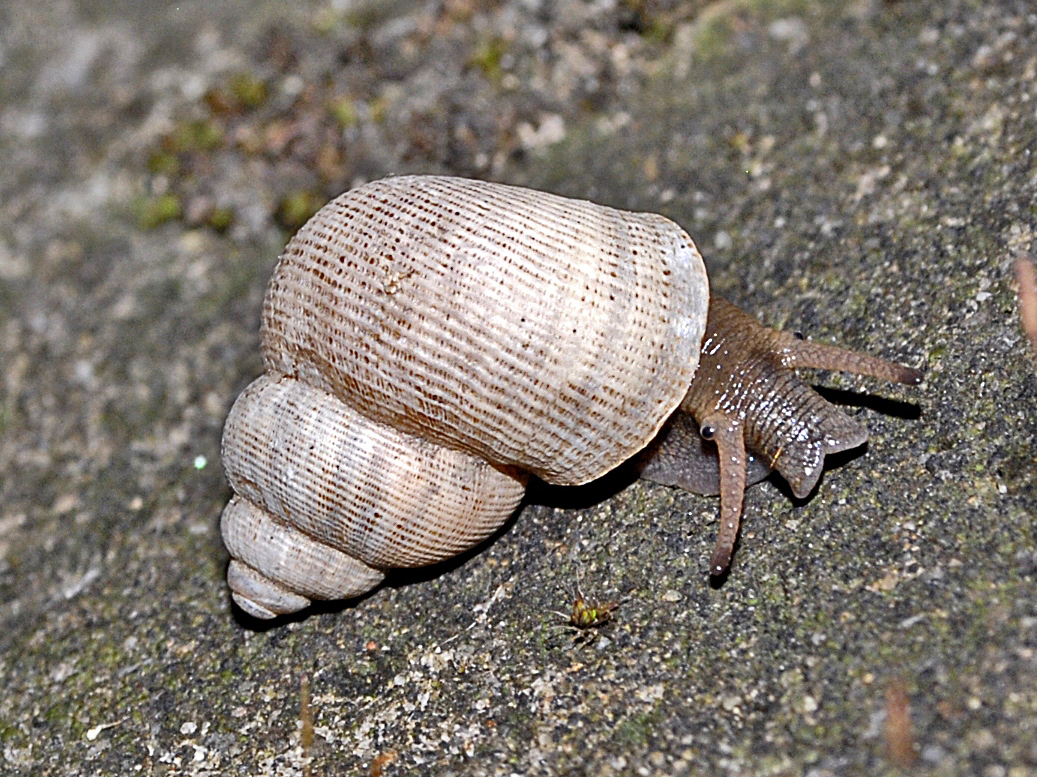
- Pomatias elegans

Scientific classification
- Kingdom: Animalia
- Phylum: Mollusca
- Class: Gastropoda
- Subclass: Caenogastropoda
- Order: Littorinimorpha
- Family: Pomatiidae
- Subfamily: Pomatiinae; Newton, 1891

= Pomatiinae =

Subfamily of gastropods

Pomatiinae is a subfamily of operculate land snails, terrestrial gastropod mollusks in the family Pomatiidae.

== Genera ==
Genera within the subfamily Pomatiinae include:

- Cyclostoma Lamarck, 1899
- Cyclotopsis Blanford, 1864
- Ericia Partiot, 1848
- Georgia Bourguignat, 1882
- Guillainia Crosse, 1884
- Leonia Gray, 1850
- Lithidion Gray, 1850
- Otopoma Gray, 1850
- Pomatias Studer, 1789 - type genus of the family Pomatiidae
- Tropidophora Troschel, 1847
- Tudorella Fischer, 1885
