= Subannularia =

Scientific classification
- Kingdom: Animalia
- Phylum: Mollusca
- Class: Gastropoda
- Subclass: Caenogastropoda
- Order: Littorinimorpha
- Family: Pomatiidae
- Genus: Subannularia; Torre & Bartsch, 1941

Genus of gastropods

Subannularia is a genus of land snails with an operculum, terrestrial gastropod mollusks in the family Pomatiidae.

== Species ==
Species within the genus Subannularia include:

- Subannularia jeannereti (Pfeiffer, 1861)
- Subannularia lacheri (Pfeiffer, 1861)
- Subannularia pujalsi Aguayo, 1953
- Subannularia storchi (Pfeiffer, 1861)
