= Pomatias raricosta =

Conservation status
- Data Deficient (IUCN 3.1)

Scientific classification
- Kingdom: Animalia
- Phylum: Mollusca
- Class: Gastropoda
- Subclass: Caenogastropoda
- Order: Littorinimorpha
- Family: Pomatiidae
- Genus: Pomatias
- Species: P. raricosta

Binomial name
- Pomatias raricosta Wollaston, 1878

Species of gastropod

Pomatias raricosta is a species of land snail with an operculum, a terrestrial gastropod mollusk in the family Pomatiidae. This species is endemic to Spain.
