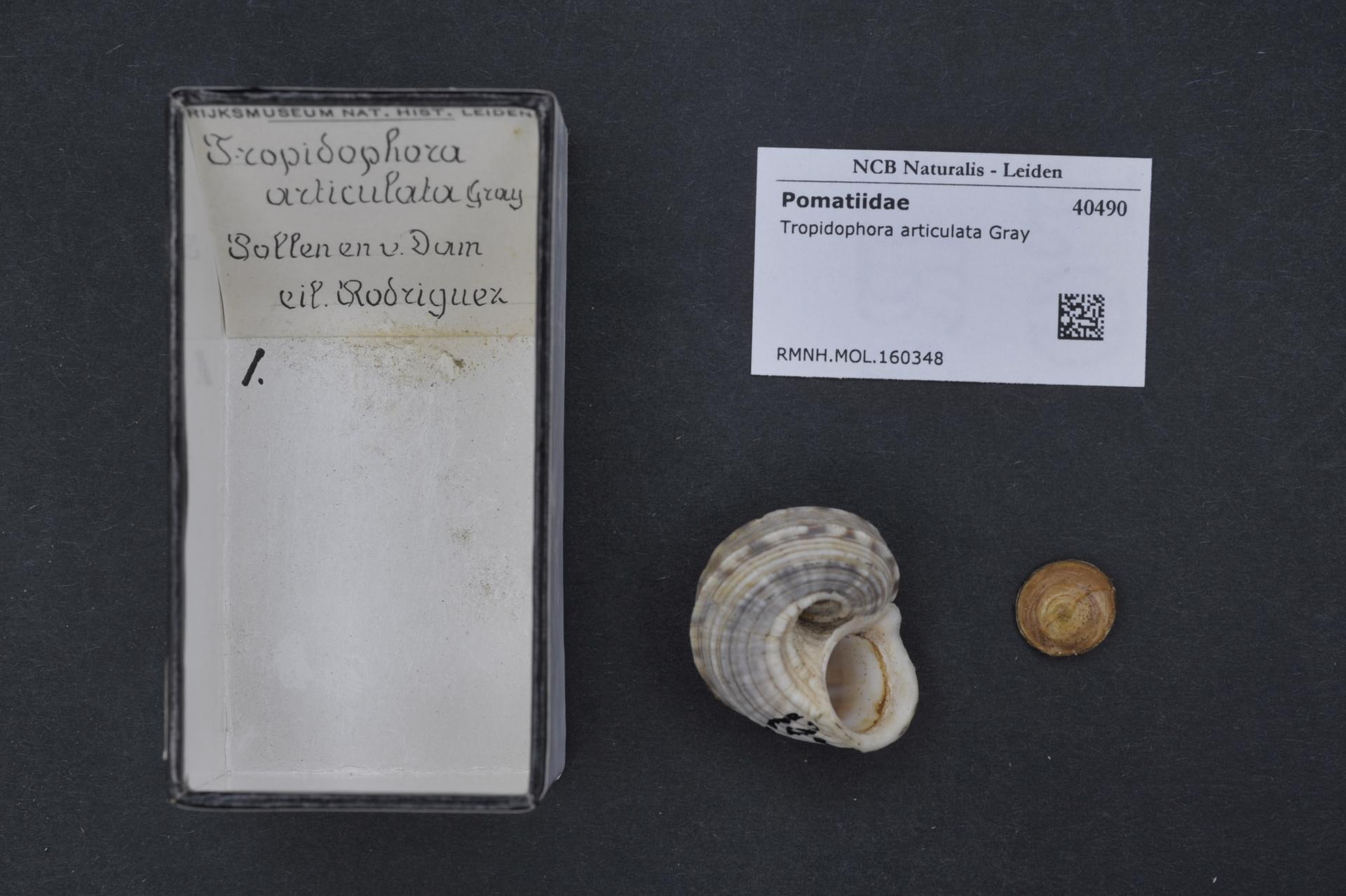

Conservation status
- Endangered (IUCN 2.3)

Scientific classification
- Kingdom: Animalia
- Phylum: Mollusca
- Class: Gastropoda
- Subclass: Caenogastropoda
- Order: Littorinimorpha
- Family: Pomatiidae
- Genus: Tropidophora
- Species: T. articulata

Binomial name
- Tropidophora articulata (Gray, 1834)

Synonyms
- Cyclostomus articulatus Gray, 1834

= Tropidophora articulata =

Species of gastropod

Tropidophora articulata is a species of land snail with a gill and an operculum. It is a terrestrial gastropod mollusk in the family Pomatiidae.

This species is endemic to Rodrigues Island, Mauritius.
