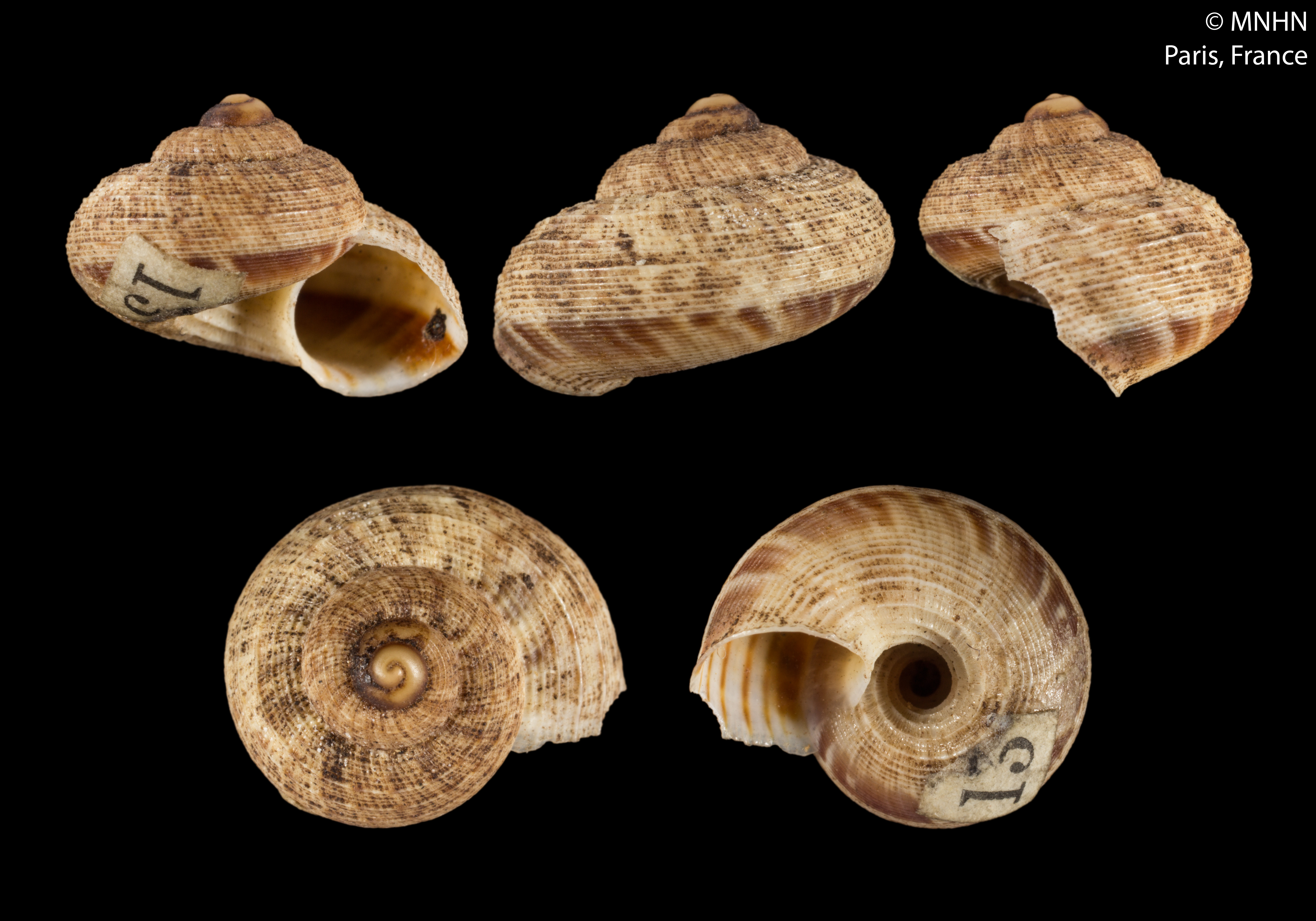
- Shell of † Tropidophora desmazuresi (syntype at MNHN, Paris)

Conservation status
- Extinct (IUCN 2.3)

Scientific classification
- Kingdom: Animalia
- Phylum: Mollusca
- Class: Gastropoda
- Subclass: Caenogastropoda
- Order: Littorinimorpha
- Family: Pomatiidae
- Genus: Tropidophora
- Species: †T. desmazuresi

Binomial name
- †Tropidophora desmazuresi (Crosse, 1873)

Synonyms
- Cyclostoma desmazuresi Crosse, 1873 · (original combination)

= Tropidophora desmazuresi =

Species of gastropod

Tropidophora desmazuresi was a species of land snail with an operculum, a terrestrial gastropod mollusk in the family Pomatiidae.

== Description ==
The length of the shell attains 9.2 mm.

== Distribution ==
This species was endemic to Mauritius. It is now extinct.
