= Tropidophora deburghiae =

Conservation status
- Endangered (IUCN 2.3)

Scientific classification
- Kingdom: Animalia
- Phylum: Mollusca
- Class: Gastropoda
- Subclass: Caenogastropoda
- Order: Littorinimorpha
- Family: Pomatiidae
- Genus: Tropidophora
- Species: T. deburghiae

Binomial name
- Tropidophora deburghiae Reeve, 1861

Species of gastropod

Tropidophora deburghiae is a species of land snail with a gill and an operculum, a terrestrial gastropod mollusk in the family Pomatiidae.

This species is endemic to Madagascar.
