= Troschelvindex =

Scientific classification
- Kingdom: Animalia
- Phylum: Mollusca
- Class: Gastropoda
- Subclass: Caenogastropoda
- Order: Littorinimorpha
- Family: Pomatiidae
- Genus: Troschelvindex; Baker, 1924

Genus of gastropods

Troschelvindex is a genus of land snails with an operculum: these terrestrial gastropod mollusks are in the family Pomatiidae.

== Species ==
Species within the genus Troschelvindex include:

- Troschelvindex agrestis (Pfeiffer, 1862)
- Troschelvindex alayoi Aguayo & Jaume, 1947
- Troschelvindex arangiana (Gundlach in Pfeiffer, 1857
- Troschelvindex auriflexum Aguayo, 1953
- Troschelvindex barbouri (Torre & Bartsch, 1941)
- Troschelvindex bebini (Arango, 1865)
- Troschelvindex candeana (d’Orbigny, 1842)
- Troschelvindex freirei Aguayo & Jaume, 1947
- Troschelvindex inculta (Poey, 1851)
- Troschelvindex jiguanensis (Pfeiffer, 1861)
- Troschelvindex minia (Gundlach in Poey, 1858)
- Troschelvindex rocai (Torre & Bartsch, 1941)
- Troschelvindex tracta (Gundlach in Poey, 1858)
