= Guajaibona =

Scientific classification
- Kingdom: Animalia
- Phylum: Mollusca
- Class: Gastropoda
- Subclass: Caenogastropoda
- Order: Littorinimorpha
- Family: Pomatiidae
- Genus: Guajaibona; Torre & Bartsch, 1941

Genus of gastropods

Guajaibona is a genus of land snails with an operculum, terrestrial gastropod mollusks in the family Pomatiidae.

== Species ==
Species within the genus Guajaibona include:

- Guajaibona petrei (d’Orbigny, 1842)
