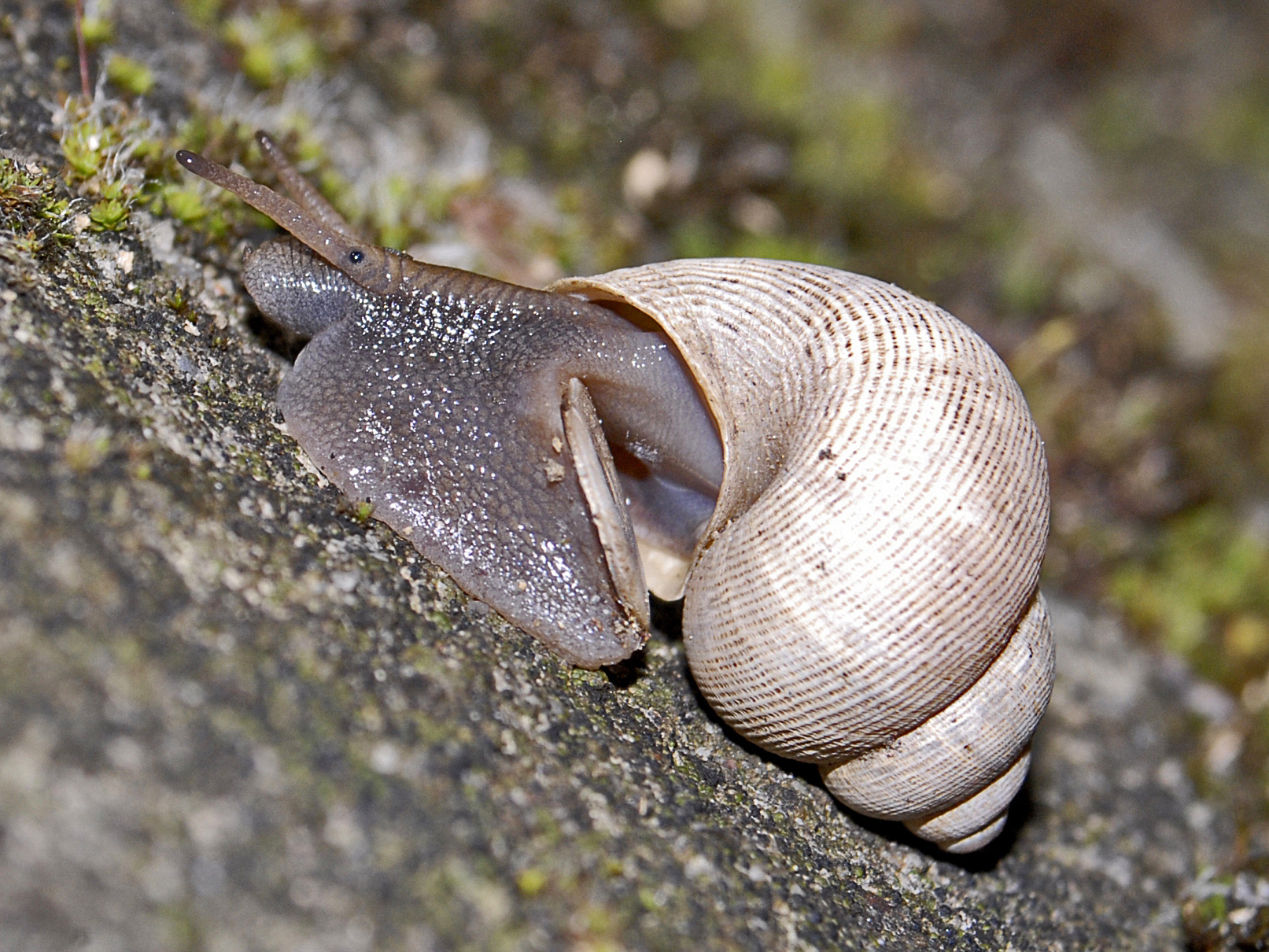
- A live individual of Pomatias elegans

Scientific classification
- Domain: Eukaryota
- Kingdom: Animalia
- Phylum: Mollusca
- Class: Gastropoda
- Subclass: Caenogastropoda
- Order: Littorinimorpha
- Superfamily: Littorinoidea
- Family: Pomatiidae
- Subfamily: Pomatiinae
- Genus: Pomatias; Studer, 1789

Type species
- Nerita elegans O. F. Müller, 1774

Synonyms
- Bulimus (Pomatias) S. Studer, 1789; Canaripoma Starobogatov & Anistratenko, 1991; Cochlocycla Jan, 1830; Cyclostoma Draparnaud, 1801 (invalid: junior homonym of Cyclostoma Lamarck, 1799); Cyclostoma (Cochlocycla) Jan, 1830 (original rank); Cyclostoma (Cyclostomus) Montfort, 1810 (unaccepted rank); Cyclostoma (Ericia) Partiot, 1848; Cyclostoma (Pomatias) S. Studer, 1789; Cyclostomus Montfort, 1810; Cyclostomus (Cyclostoma) Draparnaud, 1801; Eichwaldipoma Starobogatov & Anistratenko, 1991; Ericia Partiot, 1848; † Politioana Jekelius, 1944 (junior synonym); Pomatias (Canaripoma) Starobogatov & Anistratenko, 1991· accepted, alternate representation; Pomatias (Eichwaldipoma) Starobogatov & Anistratenko, 1991· accepted, alternate representation; † Pomatias (Meiopomatias) Kadolsky, 1989 · accepted, alternate representation; Pomatias (Pomatias) S. Studer, 1789· accepted, alternate representation

= Pomatias =

Genus of gastropods

Pomatias is a genus of small operculate land snails, terrestrial gastropod mollusks in the family Pomatiidae.

== Species ==
Species within the genus Pomatias include:

- †Pomatias antiquus (Brongniart, 1810)
- †Pomatias arneggensis Wenz, 1923
- † Pomatias bisulcatoides (Roman, 1907)
- †Pomatias bisulcatus (Zieten, 1832)
- Pomatias canariensis (d'Orbigny, 1840)
- †Pomatias conicus (Klein, 1853)
- †Pomatias consobrinus (Sandberger, 1875)
- Pomatias elegans (Müller, 1774) - Round-mouthed Snail
- † Pomatias fuggeri (Tausch, 1886)
- Pomatias glaucus (G.B. Sowerby II, 1843)
- † Pomatias harmeri Kennard, 1909
- † Pomatias hemiglyptus (Fontannes, 1884)
- Pomatias hyrcanum (Martens, 1874)
- † Pomatias jagici (Brusina, 1892)
- † Pomatias kochi (Gaál, 1910)
- Pomatias laevigatus (Webb & Berthelot, 1833)
- Pomatias lanzarotensis (Wollaston, 1878)
- Pomatias olivieri (Pfeiffer, 1846) - lives in Israel
- Pomatias palmensis (Wollaston, 1878)
- † Pomatias praecurrens (De Stefani, 1880)
- Pomatias raricosta Wollaston, 1878
- † Pomatias reticulatus (Baily, 1858)
- † Pomatias rhinoceronthophylus (Sacco, 1886)
- Pomatias rivularis (Eichwald, 1829)
- †Pomatias schrammeni (Andreae, 1902)
- † Pomatias subpictus (Sinzov, 1883)
- † Pomatias subpyrenaicus (Noulet, 1854)
- † Pomatias sulculatus (Paladilhe, 1873)
- † Pomatias szadeczkyi (Gaál, 1910)
- † Pomatias turgidulus (F. Sandberger, 1872)
- †Pomatias ulmensis (K. Miller, 1907)
- † Pomatias vasconensis (Noulet, 1854)

Synonyms

- †Pomatias moguntinus Kadolsky, 1989: synonym of † Neobembridgia moguntina Kadolsky, 1989
- Pomatias sulcatus (Draparnaud, 1801): synonym of Tudorella sulcata (Draparnaud, 1805)
