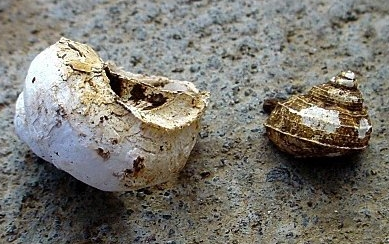
- Two old shells of Tropidophora carinata

Conservation status
- Data Deficient (IUCN 2.3)

Scientific classification
- Kingdom: Animalia
- Phylum: Mollusca
- Class: Gastropoda
- Subclass: Caenogastropoda
- Order: Littorinimorpha
- Family: Pomatiidae
- Genus: Tropidophora
- Species: T. carinata

Binomial name
- Tropidophora carinata (Born, 1780)

= Tropidophora carinata =

Species of gastropod

Tropidophora carinata is a species of land snail with a gill and an operculum, a terrestrial gastropod mollusk in the family Pomatiidae.

This species was found in Mauritius and Réunion, but it may now be extinct.
