= Hendersonina =

Scientific classification
- Kingdom: Animalia
- Phylum: Mollusca
- Class: Gastropoda
- Subclass: Caenogastropoda
- Order: Littorinimorpha
- Family: Pomatiidae
- Genus: Hendersonina; Torre & Bartsch, 1938

Genus of gastropods

Hendersonina is a genus of land snails with an operculum, terrestrial gastropod mollusks in the family Pomatiidae.

== Species ==
Species within the genus Hendersonina include:

- Hendersonina bermudezi Torre & Bartsch, 1938
- Hendersonina canaliculata (Gundlach in Pfeiffer, 1863)
- Hendersonina cirrata (Wright in Pfeiffer, 1867)
- Hendersonina deceptor (Arango, 1882)
- Hendersonina discolorans (Wright in Pfeiffer, 1863)
- Hendersonina echinulata (Wright in Pfeiffer, 1863)
- Hendersonina hamlini (Arango, 1882)
- Hendersonina hendersoni (Torre, 1909)
- Hendersonina maculata Torre & Bartsch, 1938
- Hendersonina mendax (Torre & Bartsch, 1938)
- Hendersonina scobina (Gundlach in Pfeiffer, 1863)
- Hendersonina sinuosa (Wright in Pfeiffer, 1862)
