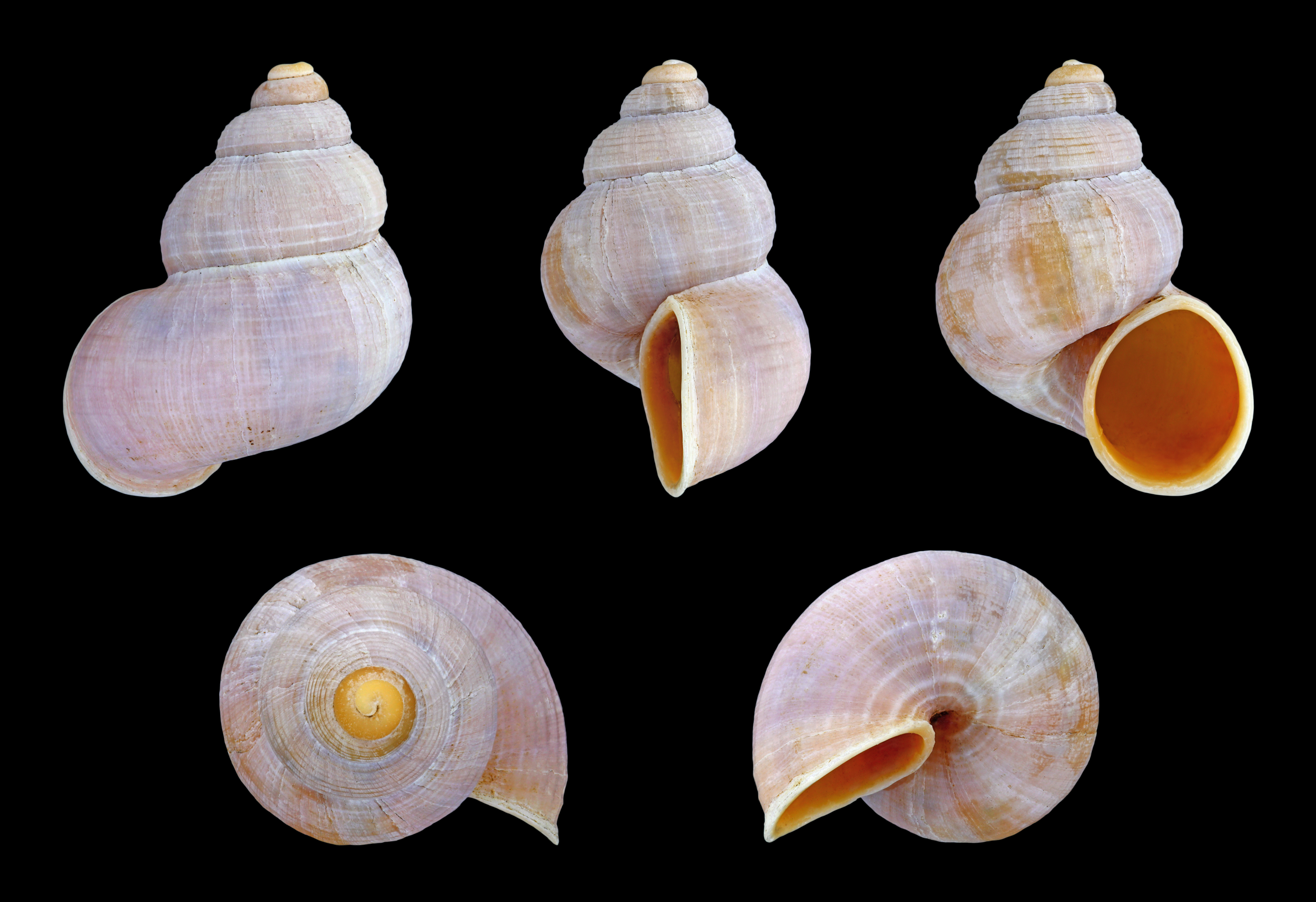
- Five views of a shell of Tudorella sulcata

Conservation status
- Least Concern (IUCN 3.1)

Scientific classification
- Kingdom: Animalia
- Phylum: Mollusca
- Class: Gastropoda
- Subclass: Caenogastropoda
- Order: Littorinimorpha
- Family: Pomatiidae
- Subfamily: Pomatiinae
- Genus: Tudorella
- Species: T. sulcata

Binomial name
- Tudorella sulcata (Draparnaud, 1805)

Synonyms
- Cyclostoma (Tudorella) sulcatum (Draparnaud, 1805); Cyclostoma aurantium Anton, 1838 (junior synonym); Cyclostoma sulcata Draparnaud, 1805 (incorrect grammatical agreement of specific epithet); Cyclostoma sulcatum Draparnaud, 1805 (original combination); Pomatias sulcatus (Draparnaud, 1805)

= Tudorella sulcata =

Species of gastropod

Tudorella sulcata is a species of land snail which has an operculum, a terrestrial gastropod mollusk in the family Pomatiidae.

== Distribution ==
The species (T. s. sulcata) occurs in Algeria, France, Portugal and (Tudorella sp. pl.) also occurs in Morocco, Spain, Sardinia, Malta Tunisia and Sicily.
