= Cyclostoma =

Scientific classification
- Kingdom: Animalia
- Phylum: Mollusca
- Class: Gastropoda
- Subclass: Caenogastropoda
- Order: Littorinimorpha
- Family: Pomatiidae
- Genus: Cyclostoma; Lamarck, 1799

Type species
- Turbo scalaris Linnaeus, 1758

Genus of molluscs

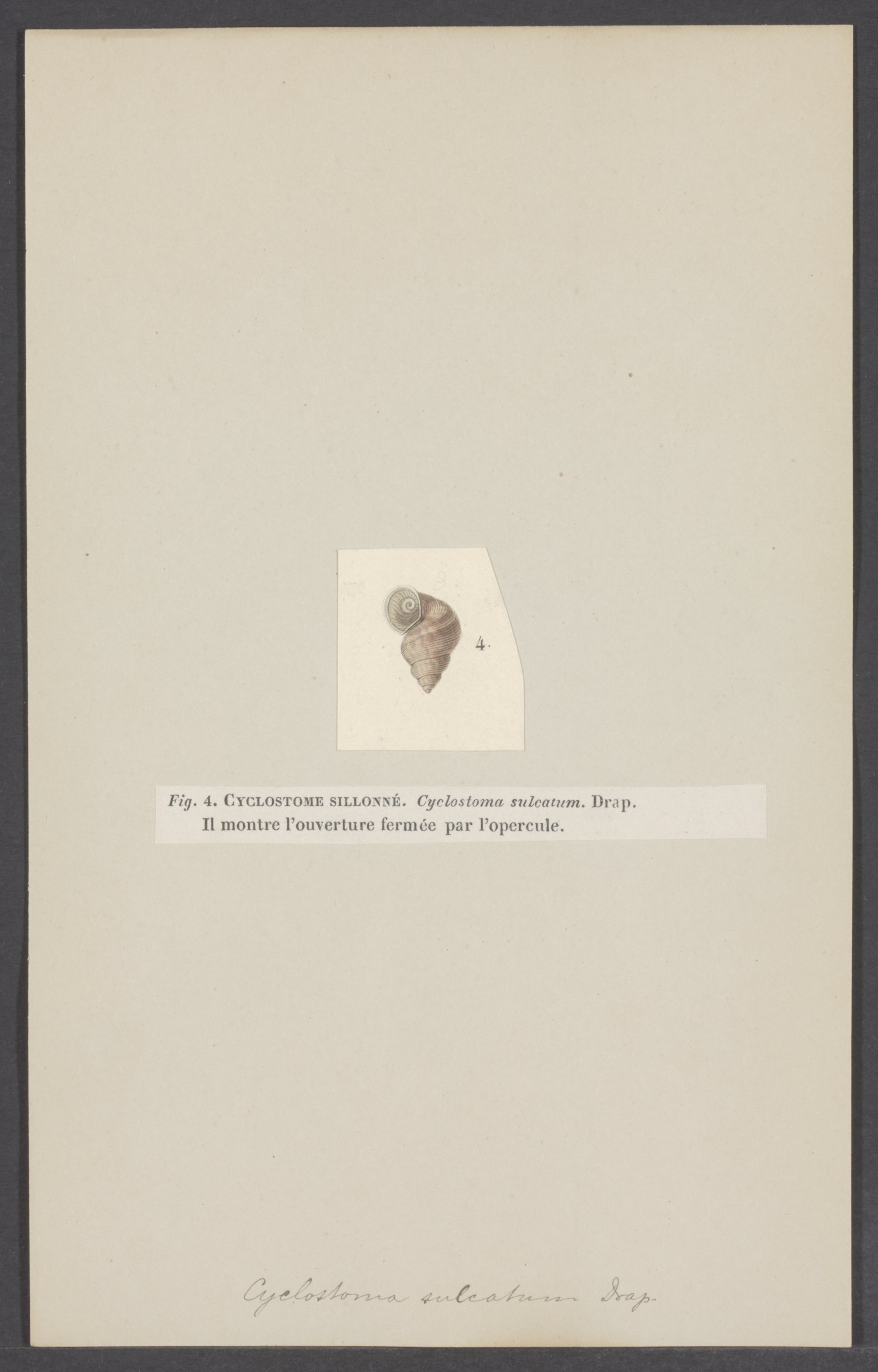
Historical zoological illustration of Cyclostoma sulcatum

Cyclostoma is an obsolete genus name of operculate snails with circular aperture.

This genus has become a synonym of Epitonium Röding, 1798

== Species brought into synonymy ==
- Cyclostoma scalare (Linnaeus, 1758) (type species): synonym of Turbo scalaris Linnaeus, 1758 (original name), synonym of Epitonium scalare (Linnaeus, 1758)
- Cyclostoma elegans (O.F. Müller 1774): synonym of Nerita elegans O.F. Müller 1774 (original name), synonym of Pomatias elegans (O.F. Müller 1774)
- Cyclostoma acutum Draparnaud, 1805: synonym of Hydrobia acuta acuta (Draparnaud, 1805)
- Cyclostoma breve Draparnaud, 1805: synonym of Avenionia brevis (Draparnaud, 1805)
- Cyclostoma cincinnatiensis I. Lea, 1840: synonym of Pomatiopsis cincinnatiensis (I. Lea, 1840)
- Cyclostoma concinnum Scacchi, 1836: synonym of Truncatella subcylindrica (Linnaeus, 1767)
- Cyclostoma costulatum Rossmässler, 1837: synonym of Pomatias rivularis (Eichwald, 1829)
- Cyclostoma delicatum Philippi, 1844: synonym of Torellia delicata (Philippi, 1844)
- Cyclostoma gibbum Draparnaud, 1805: synonym of † Belgrandia gibba (Draparnaud, 1805)
- Cyclostoma lapidaria Say, 1817: synonym of Pomatiopsis lapidaria (Say, 1817)
- Cyclostoma marginatum Say, 1821: synonym of Pupoides albilabris (C. B. Adams, 1841)
- † Cyclostoma rubeschi Reuss in Reuss & Meyer, 1849 : synonym of † Staadtiellopsis rubeschi (Reuss in Reuss & Meyer, 1849)
- Cyclostoma subdisjuncta H. Adams, 1868: synonym of Tubiola subdisjuncta (H. Adams, 1868)
- Cyclostoma truncatulum Draparnaud, 1801: synonym of Truncatella subcylindrica (Linnaeus, 1767)
