= Chondrothyrella =

Scientific classification
- Kingdom: Animalia
- Phylum: Mollusca
- Class: Gastropoda
- Subclass: Caenogastropoda
- Order: Littorinimorpha
- Superfamily: Littorinoidea
- Family: Pomatiidae
- Genus: Chondrothyrella; Torre & Bartsch, 1938

Genus of gastropods

Chondrothyrella is a genus of land snails with an operculum, terrestrial gastropod mollusks in the family Pomatiidae.

== Species ==
Species within the genus Chondrothyrella include:

- Chondrothyrella assimilis (Gundlach in Pfeiffer, 1863)
- Chondrothyrella claudicans (Poey, 1851)
- Chondrothyrella cuzcoensis Torre & Bartsch, 1938
- Chondrothyrella excisa (Gundlach in Pfeiffer, 1863)
- Chondrothyrella ottonis (Pfeiffer, 1846)
- Chondrothyrella paredonis Sánchez Roig, 1951
- Chondrothyrella perturbata Torre & Bartsch, 1938
- Chondrothyrella petricosa (Morelet, 1851)
- Chondrothyrella pudica (d’Orbigny, 1842)
- Chondrothyrella tenebrosa (Morelet, 1849)
