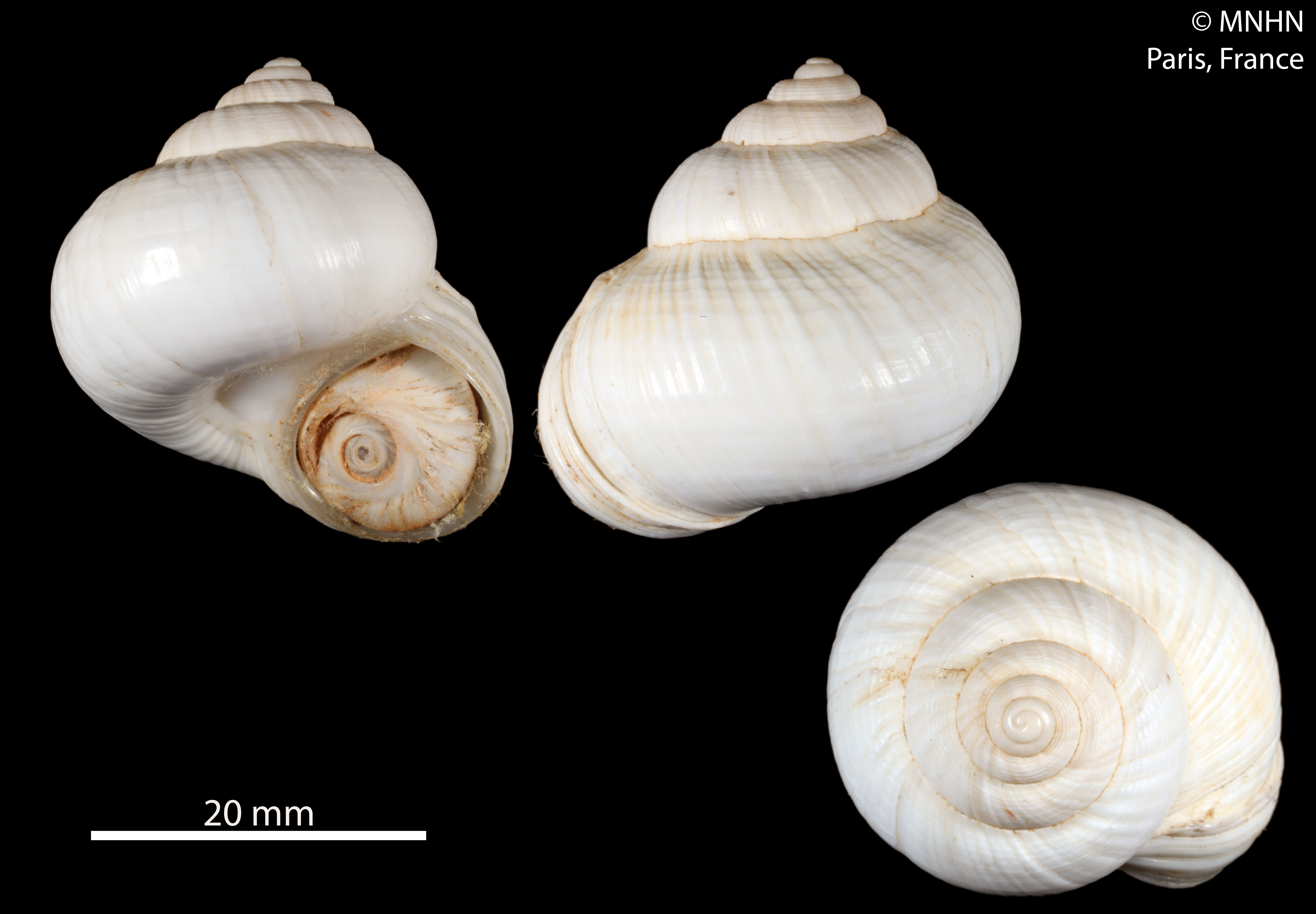
- Shell of Rochebrunia guillaini naticopsis (specimen at MNHN, Paris)

Scientific classification
- Kingdom: Animalia
- Phylum: Mollusca
- Class: Gastropoda
- Subclass: Caenogastropoda
- Order: Littorinimorpha
- Superfamily: Littorinoidea
- Family: Pomatiidae
- Genus: Rochebrunia; Bourguignat, 1881

Synonyms
- Arabia Pallary, 1925; Otopoma (Georgia) Bourguignat, 1882; Otopoma (Revoilia) Bourguignat, 1881; Otopoma (Rochebrunia) Bourguignat, 1881; Pseudotopoma Thiele, 1929; Revoilia Bourguignat, 1881

= Rochebrunia =

Genus of land snails

Rochebrunia is a genus of small operculate land snails, terrestrial gastropod mollusks in the family Pomatiidae.

== Species ==
- Rochebrunia bentiana (Melvill, 1895)
- Rochebrunia bourguignati Neubert, 2009
- Rochebrunia clausa (G. B. Sowerby I, 1843)
- Rochebrunia dhofarense (Melvill & Ponsonby, 1896)
- Rochebrunia guillaini (Petit de la Saussaye, 1850)
- Rochebrunia hinduorum (W. T. Blanford, 1864)
- Rochebrunia milneedwardsi (Bourguignat, 1881)
- Rochebrunia obtusa (L. Pfeiffer, 1862)
- Rochebrunia perrieri (Bourguignat, 1881)
