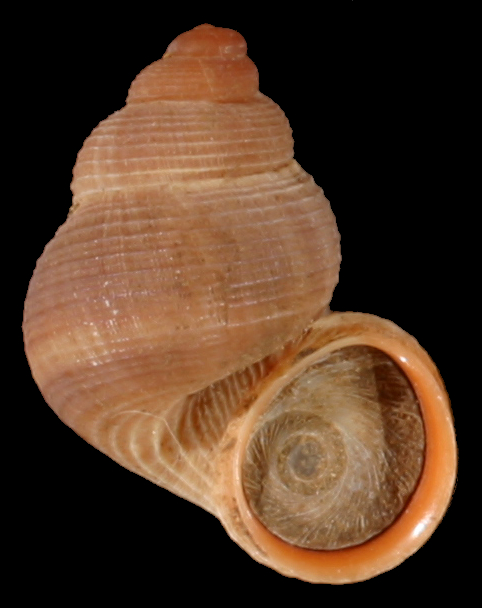
- Apertural view of a shell and operculum of the land snail Tudorella sulcata

Scientific classification
- Kingdom: Animalia
- Phylum: Mollusca
- Class: Gastropoda
- Subclass: Caenogastropoda
- Order: Littorinimorpha
- Superfamily: Littorinoidea
- Family: Pomatiidae
- Subfamily: Pomatiinae
- Genus: Tudorella; Fischer, 1885

Type species
- Cyclostoma ferruginea Lamarck, 1822

Synonyms
- Cyclostoma (Tudorella) P. Fischer, 1885 (original rank)

= Tudorella =

Genus of gastropods

Tudorella is a genus of land snails, terrestrial gastropod mollusks in the family Pomatiidae.

== Distribution ==
This genus of land snails inhabits the coasts of the western Mediterranean Sea.

== Species ==
Species in the genus Tudorella include:

- † Tudorella baudoni (Michaud, 1862)
- † Tudorella draparnaudii (Matheron, 1843)
- Tudorella ferruginea (Lamarck, 1822)
- † Tudorella lartetii (Noulet, 1854)
- Tudorella mauretanica (Pallary, 1898)
- Tudorella melitense (G.B. Sowerby I, 1847)
- Tudorella multisulcata (Potiez & Michaud, 1838)
- Tudorella panormitana (Sacchi, 1954)
- Tudorella rubicunda (Pallary, 1936)
- † Tudorella schafarziki (Gaál, 1910) †
- † Tudorella sepulta (Rambur, 1862)
- Tudorella sulcata (Draparnaud, 1805)

Species brought into synonymy

- † Tudorella conica (Klein, 1853): synonym of † Pomatias conicus (Klein, 1853)
- † Tudorella draparnaudi [sic]: synonym of † Tudorella draparnaudii (Matheron, 1843) (incorrect subsequent spelling)
- † Tudorella larteti [sic]: synonym of Tudorella lartetii † (Noulet, 1854)
