= Bermudezia =

Scientific classification
- Kingdom: Animalia
- Phylum: Mollusca
- Class: Gastropoda
- Subclass: Caenogastropoda
- Order: Littorinimorpha
- Superfamily: Littorinoidea
- Family: Pomatiidae
- Genus: Bermudezia; Torre & Bartsch, 1941

Genus of gastropods

Bermudezia is a genus of land snails with an operculum, terrestrial gastropod mollusks in the family Pomatiidae.

== Species ==
Species within the genus Bermudezia include:

- Bermudezia bermudezi (Torre & Bartsch, 1941)
- Bermudezia biayensis (Torre & Bartsch, 1941)
- Bermudezia capestanyi (Torre & Bartsch, 1941)
- Bermudezia euglypta (Torre & Bartsch, 1941)
- Bermudezia eurystoma (Torre & Bartsch, 1941)
- Bermudezia lirata (Torre & Bartsch, 1941)
- Bermudezia najazaensis (Torre & Bartsch, 1941)
- Bermudezia obliterata (Torre & Bartsch, 1941)
- Bermudezia payroli (Torre & Bartsch, 1941)
- Bermudezia sifontesi (Torre & Bartsch, 1941)
