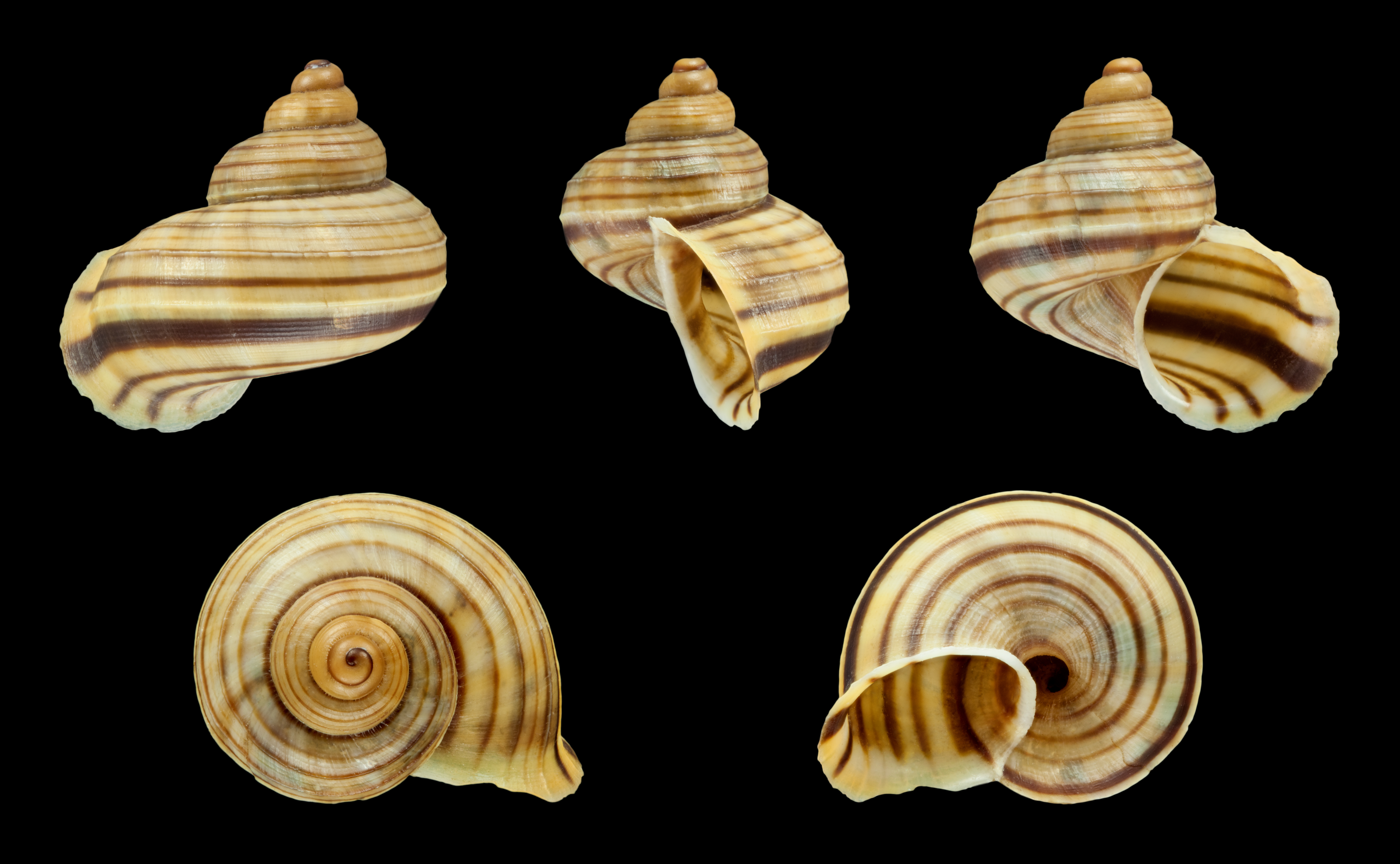
- Shell of the species Tropidophora perinetensis

Scientific classification
- Kingdom: Animalia
- Phylum: Mollusca
- Class: Gastropoda
- Subclass: Caenogastropoda
- Order: Littorinimorpha
- Superfamily: Littorinoidea
- Family: Pomatiidae
- Subfamily: Pomatiinae
- Genus: Tropidophora; Troschel, 1847

Type species
- Cyclostoma cuvieriana Petit de la Saussaye, 1841

Diversity
- 95 specific names, unknown number of true biological species

Synonyms
- Cyclostoma (Ligatella) E. von Martens, 1880; Cyclostoma (Tropidophora) Troschel, 1847; Cyclostomus (Tropidophora) Troschel, 1847; Ligatella E. von Martens, 1880; Tropidophora (Eutropidophora) Möllendorff, 1898· accepted, alternate representation; Tropidophora (Ligatella) E. von Martens, 1880; Tropidophora (Tropidophora) Troschel, 1847· accepted, alternate representation; Tropidophora (Virgotropidophora) Fischer-Piette & Bedoucha, 1965· accepted, alternate representation

= Tropidophora =

Genus of gastropods

Tropidophora is a genus of land snails with an operculum, terrestrial gastropod mollusks in the family Pomatiidae.

== Distribution ==
These large, split-sole snails are found in Tanzania, Madagascar, the Mascarenes, the Comoros and South Africa.

95-99% of Tropidophora species are endemic to Madagascar.

== Species ==
The present classification of this genus into three subgenera, 95 species and 142 varieties is complex and confused. This classification is best ignored temporarily, as it is based on subtle morphological varieties among small samples. It is also assumed that many smaller species remain to be discovered.

The following species are recognised in the genus Tropidophora:

- Tropidophora aequatoria (Morelet, 1890)
- Tropidophora alluaudi (Dautzenberg, 1895)
- Tropidophora alternans (L. Pfeiffer, 1853)
- Tropidophora ambilobeensis Fischer-Piette, F. Blanc & Salvat, 1969
- Tropidophora anceps (E. von Martens, 1878)
- Tropidophora andrakarakarensis Fischer-Piette & Testud, 1973
- Tropidophora andrapangana Fischer-Piette, F. Blanc & Salvat, 1969
- Tropidophora articulata (J. E. Gray, 1833)
- Tropidophora aspera (Potiez & Michaud, 1838)
- Tropidophora balteata (G. B. Sowerby III, 1874)
- Tropidophora bathiei Fischer-Piette, 1949
- Tropidophora bemaraensis Fischer-Piette, 1949
- Tropidophora besalampiensis Fischer-Piette, 1949
- Tropidophora betsileoensis (E. A. Smith, 1882)
- Tropidophora bicarinata (G. B. Sowerby I, 1843)
- Tropidophora boucheti Fischer-Piette, C. P. Blanc, F. Blanc & F. Salvat, 1993
- Tropidophora calcarea (G. B. Sowerby I, 1843)
- Tropidophora carinata (Born, 1778)
- Tropidophora carnicolor Fulton, 1902
- Tropidophora castanea (L. Pfeiffer, 1851)
- Tropidophora cavernarum Fischer-Piette, F. Blanc & Salvat, 1969
- Tropidophora cecionii Bacci, 1943
- Tropidophora chavani Fischer-Piette, 1949
- Tropidophora chromium (Morelet, 1877)
- Tropidophora cincinna (G. B. Sowerby I, 1843)
- Tropidophora comburens Melvill & Ponsonby, 1903
- Tropidophora concinna Preston, 1910
- Tropidophora consocia (L. Pfeiffer, 1852)
- Tropidophora coquandiana (Petit de la Saussaye, 1852)
- Tropidophora crenulata Fulton, 1902
- Tropidophora creplini (Dunker, 1848)
- Tropidophora cuvieriana (Petit de la Saussaye, 1841)
- Tropidophora deburghiae (Reeve, 1861)
- Tropidophora deliciosa (G. B. Sowerby I, 1850)
- Tropidophora delmaresi (Bourguignat, 1887)
- Tropidophora denisi Fischer-Piette, 1949
- Tropidophora denselirata Fischer-Piette, F. Blanc & Salvat, 1969
- Tropidophora deshayesiana (Petit de la Saussaye, 1844)
- †Tropidophora desmazuresi (Crosse, 1873)
- Tropidophora diegoensis Fischer-Piette, 1949
- Tropidophora dingeoni Fischer-Piette, F. Blanc & Salvat, 1969
- Tropidophora erlangeri (Kobelt, 1910)
- Tropidophora eugeniae (Reeve, 1857)
- Tropidophora eustola (Crosse & P. Fischer, 1887)
- Tropidophora felicis Fischer-Piette & Bedoucha, 1965
- Tropidophora feringalavaensis Fischer-Piette, C. P. Blanc, F. Blanc & F. Salvat, 1993
- Tropidophora filopura Fischer-Piette, 1949
- Tropidophora filostriata (G. B. Sowerby III, 1874)
- Tropidophora fimbriata (Lamarck, 1822)
- Tropidophora fivanonensis Fischer-Piette & Bedoucha, 1965
- Tropidophora formosa (G. B. Sowerby I, 1849)
- Tropidophora foveolata (Melvill & Ponsonby, 1895)
- Tropidophora franzhuberi Thach, 2021
- Tropidophora freyi O. Boettger, 1892
- Tropidophora fulvescens (G. B. Sowerby I, 1843)
- Tropidophora fuscula (L. Pfeiffer, 1853)
- Tropidophora gallorum Fischer-Piette, F. Blanc & Salvat, 1969
- Tropidophora gardineri Gerlach, 2006
- Tropidophora goudotiana (G. B. Sowerby I, 1843)
- Tropidophora grisea (L. Pfeiffer, 1854)
- Tropidophora hartvigiana (L. Pfeiffer, 1862)
- Tropidophora hildebrandti (E. von Martens, 1876)
- Tropidophora humberti Fischer-Piette, 1949
- Tropidophora humbloti (Morelet, 1886)
- Tropidophora humbug O. L. Griffiths & D. G. Herbert, 2013
- Tropidophora icterica (G. B. Sowerby I, 1843)
- Tropidophora insularis (L. Pfeiffer, 1854)
- Tropidophora interrupta Fischer-Piette, F. Blanc & Salvat, 1969
- Tropidophora ivongoensis Fischer-Piette, F. Blanc & Vukadinovic, 1974
- Tropidophora johnsoni (E. A. Smith, 1882)
- Tropidophora lamarckii (Petit de la Saussaye, 1850)
- Tropidophora letourneuxi (Bourguignat, 1887)
- Tropidophora lienardi (Morelet, 1877)
- Tropidophora ligata (O. F. Müller, 1774)
- Tropidophora ligatula (Grateloup, 1840)
- Tropidophora lincolni Emberton, 2009
- Tropidophora lineata (L. Pfeiffer, 1854)
- Tropidophora lirata (L. Pfeiffer, 1852)
- Tropidophora liratoides Fischer-Piette, C. P. Blanc, F. Blanc & F. Salvat, 1993
- Tropidophora luti (Fischer-Piette, C. P. Blanc, F. Blanc & Salvat, 1993)
- Tropidophora maignei Fischer-Piette, C. P. Blanc, F. Blanc & F. Salvat, 1993
- Tropidophora marojeziana Fischer-Piette, C. P. Blanc, F. Blanc & F. Salvat, 1993
- Tropidophora mauritiana (H. Adams, 1867)
- Tropidophora michaudi (Grateloup, 1841)
- Tropidophora microchasma (L. Pfeiffer, 1857)
- Tropidophora milloti Fischer-Piette, 1949
- Tropidophora miocenica (Verdcourt, 1963) †
- Tropidophora moniliata (Morelet, 1881)
- Tropidophora morondavensis Fischer-Piette, 1949
- Tropidophora moulinsii (Grateloup, 1840)
- Tropidophora nyasana (E. A. Smith, 1899)
- Tropidophora occlusa (Mörch, 1852)
- Tropidophora ochracea (Melvill & Ponsonby, 1896)
- Tropidophora oppessulata Fischer-Piette, F. Blanc & Salvat, 1969
- Tropidophora perfecta Fulton, 1903
- Tropidophora perinetensis Fischer-Piette & Bedoucha, 1965
- Tropidophora petiti Fischer-Piette, 1949
- Tropidophora philippiana (L. Pfeiffer, 1852)
- Tropidophora plurilirata Fulton, 1903
- Tropidophora polyzonata (Morelet, 1886)
- Tropidophora principalis (L. Pfeiffer, 1859)
- Tropidophora propeconsocia Fischer-Piette & Bedoucha, 1965
- Tropidophora propevitellina Fischer-Piette, C. P. Blanc, F. Blanc & F. Salvat, 1993
- Tropidophora puerilis Fischer-Piette & Bedoucha, 1965
- Tropidophora pulchella (G. B. Sowerby I, 1843)
- Tropidophora pulchra (J. E. Gray, 1833)
- Tropidophora pyrostoma (G. B. Sowerby I, in Reeve, 1842)
- Tropidophora reesi Fischer-Piette, 1949
- Tropidophora reticulata (A. Adams & Reeve, 1850)
- Tropidophora salvati Fischer-Piette & Bedoucha, 1965
- Tropidophora sarcodes (L. Pfeiffer, 1857)
- Tropidophora sarodranensis Fischer-Piette, F. Blanc & Salvat, 1969
- Tropidophora scabra (H. Adams, 1867)
- Tropidophora secunda Fischer-Piette & Bedoucha, 1965
- Tropidophora semidecussata (L. Pfeiffer, 1847)
- Tropidophora semilirata (Morelet, 1881)
- †Tropidophora semilineata P.M.A. Morelet, 1881
- Tropidophora sericea O. L. Griffiths & D. G. Herbert, 2013
- Tropidophora sikorae (Fulton, 1901)
- Tropidophora soulaiana Fischer-Piette & Testud, 1973
- Tropidophora sowerbyi (L. Pfeiffer, 1846)
- Tropidophora surda Fischer-Piette, F. Blanc & Salvat, 1969
- Tropidophora tenuis (G. B. Sowerby I, 1843)
- Tropidophora theobaldi Fischer-Piette, C. P. Blanc, F. Blanc & F. Salvat, 1993
- Tropidophora thesauri Fischer-Piette, 1949
- Tropidophora tomlini Fischer-Piette, 1949
- Tropidophora transvaalensis (Melvill & Ponsonby, 1891)
- Tropidophora tricarinata (O. F. Müller, 1774)
- Tropidophora tulearensis Fischer-Piette, 1949
- Tropidophora unicarinata (Lamarck, 1822)
- Tropidophora vallorzi Fischer-Piette, C. P. Blanc, F. Blanc & F. Salvat, 1993
- Tropidophora veridis Thach & F. Huber, 2021
- Tropidophora vesconis (Morelet, 1860)
- Tropidophora vexillum (G. B. Sowerby III, 1873)
- Tropidophora vignali Fischer-Piette, 1949
- Tropidophora vincentflorensi O. L. Griffiths, 2000
- Tropidophora virgata (G. B. Sowerby I, 1843)
- Tropidophora virgo (L. Pfeiffer, 1855)
- Tropidophora vitellina (L. Pfeiffer, 1852)
- Tropidophora vittata (G. B. Sowerby I,, 1842)
- Tropidophora vuillemini Fischer-Piette, F. Blanc & Salvat, 1969
- Tropidophora winckworthi Fischer-Piette, 1949
- Tropidophora xanthocheila (G. B. Sowerby I, 1850)
- Tropidophora zanguebarica (Petit de la Saussaye, 1850)
- Tropidophora zonata (Petit de la Saussaye, 1850)

== Synonyms ==
- Tropidophora anaglypta (Morelet, 1886): synonym of Otopoma anaglyptum Morelet, 1886
- Tropidophora boivini (L. Pfeiffer, 1857): synonym of Tropidophora tricarinata var. boivini (L. Pfeiffer, 1856): synonym of Tropidophora tricarinata (O. F. Müller, 1774)(unaccepted rank)
- Tropidophora cambieri(Bourguignat, 1889): synonym of Tropidophora letourneuxi (Bourguignat, 1887) (junior synonym)
- Tropidophora hanningtoni(G. B. Sowerby III, 1890): synonym of Tropidophora calcarea (G. B. Sowerby I, 1843) (junior synonym)
- Tropidophora huberi (Thach, 2018): synonym of Leptopoma huberi (Thach, 2018) (original combination)
- Tropidophora madagascariensis (J. E. Gray, 1833) : synonym of Tropidophora tricarinata var. madagascariensis (J. E. Gray, 1833): synonym of Tropidophora tricarinata ((O. F. Müller, 1774))
- † Tropidophora miocenicum (Verdcourt, 1963): synonym of † Tropidophora miocenica (Verdcourt, 1963) (incorrect gender agreement of specific epithet)
- † Tropidophora praecursor (Neubert & Van Damme, 2012): synonym of † Omanitopsis praecursor (Neubert & Van Damme, 2012)
- Tropidophora semilirata Fischer-Piette, F. Blanc & Salvat, 1969: synonym of Tropidophora liratoides Fischer-Piette, C. P. Blanc, F. Blanc & F. Salvat, 1993 ( junior homonym, junior secondary homonym)
- Tropidophora socotrana Godwin-Austen, 1881: synonym of Cinnabarica socotrana (Godwin-Austen, 1881) (original combination)
- Tropidophora stumpfi O. Boettger, 1889: synonym of Tropidophora fuscula (L. Pfeiffer, 1853)
