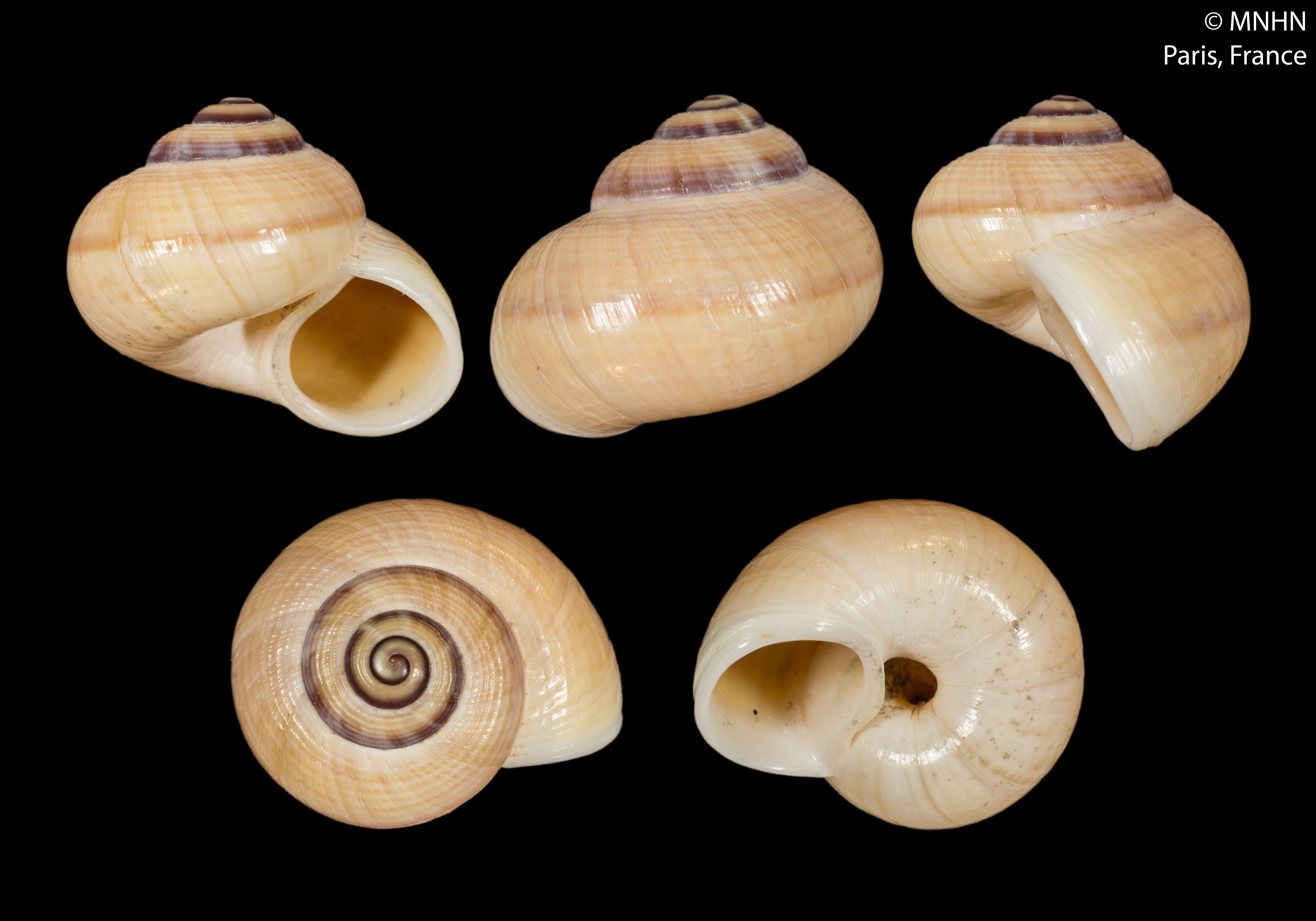
- Shell of Socotora clathratula (syntype at MNHN, Paris)

Scientific classification
- Kingdom: Animalia
- Phylum: Mollusca
- Class: Gastropoda
- Subclass: Caenogastropoda
- Order: Littorinimorpha
- Superfamily: Littorinoidea
- Family: Pomatiidae
- Genus: Socotora; Pallary, 1925

Type species
- Cyclostoma albicans G. B. Sowerby I, 1839

Synonyms
- Georgia Bourguignat, 1882; Georgia (Arabia) Pallary, 1925 (precedence of simultaneously published Socotora determined by First Reviser; Georgia (Georgia) Bourguignat, 1882 (Invalid: junior homonym of Georgia Baird & Girard, 1853 [Reptilia]; Revoilia (Socotora) Pallary, 1925

= Socotora =

Genus of molluscs (snails)

Socotora is a genus of small operculate land snails, terrestrial gastropod mollusks in the family Pomatiidae.

== Species ==
- Socotora albicans (G. B. Sowerby I, 1839)
- Socotora auricularis (Gray in Griffith & Pidgeon, 1833)
- Socotora clathratula (Récluz, 1843)
- Socotora helicoides Neubert, 2009
- Socotora naticoides (Récluz, 1843)
