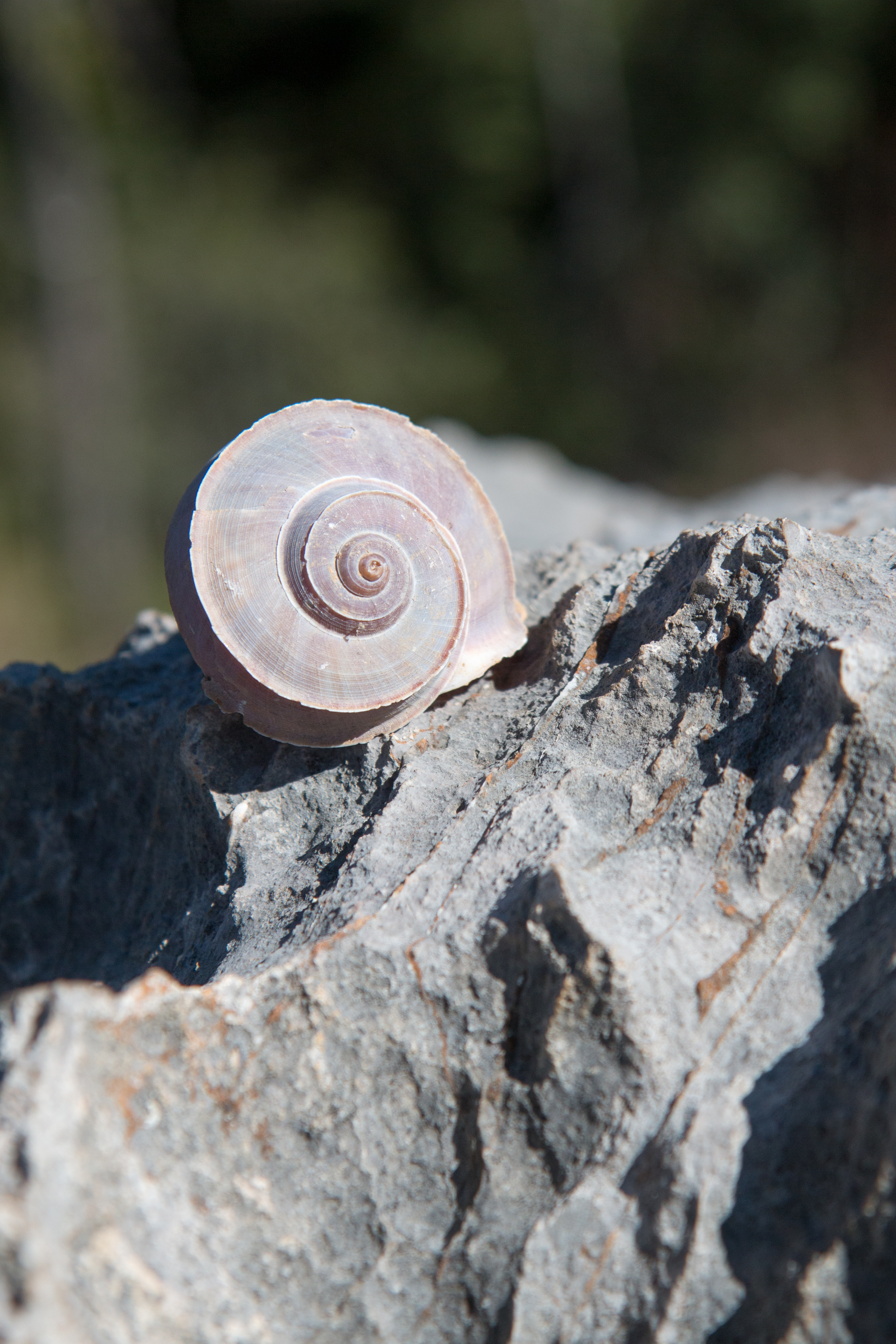
- In Madagascar

Scientific classification
- Kingdom: Animalia
- Phylum: Mollusca
- Class: Gastropoda
- Subclass: Caenogastropoda
- Order: Littorinimorpha
- Family: Pomatiidae
- Genus: Tropidophora
- Species: T. cuvieriana

Binomial name
- Tropidophora cuvieriana (Petit de la Saussaye, 1841)

Synonyms
- Cyclostoma cuvieriana Petit de la Saussaye, 1841; Tropidophora (Tropidophora) cuvieriana (Petit de la Saussaye, 1841)

= Tropidophora cuvieriana =

Species of gastropod

Tropidophora cuvieriana, common name the Cuvier tropid snail, is a species of mollusc in the family Pomatiidae. Once feared extinct, this large snail has been rediscovered. It is a poorly known species and both its breeding behavior and diet are unknown.

== Distribution ==
This species occurs in Madagascar.
