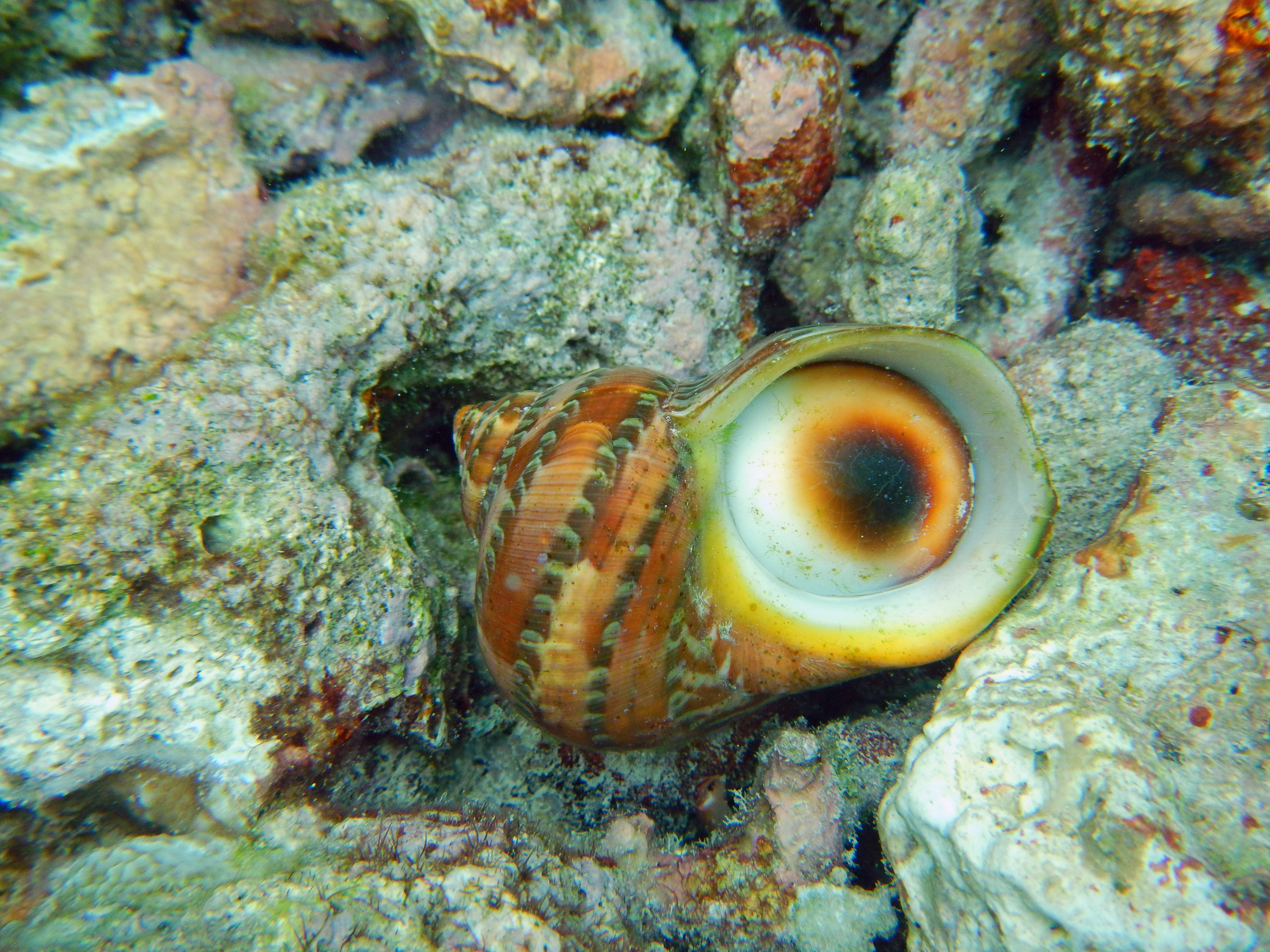

Scientific classification
- Kingdom: Animalia
- Phylum: Mollusca
- Class: Gastropoda
- Subclass: Vetigastropoda
- Order: Trochida
- Family: Turbinidae
- Genus: Turbo
- Species: T. petholatus

Binomial name
- Turbo petholatus Linnaeus, 1758

Synonyms
- Lunatica aruginosa Röding, 1798; Lunatica porphyria Röding, 1798; Turbo (Turbo) petholatus Linnaeus, 1758; Turbo (Turbo) roxas Bozzetti, 2019; Turbo aruginosa Röding, 1798; Turbo aurantia Perry, G., 1811; Turbo cingulata Röding, 1798; Turbo dinegrata Röding, 1798; Turbo humerosa Smith, 1901; Turbo obscura Röding, 1798; Turbo petholatus var. humerosus M. Smith, 1907 ·; Turbo porphyrites [sic, porphyria] (misspelling of porphyria); Turbo roxas Bozzetti, 2019; Turbo radina Webster, W.H., 1905

= Turbo petholatus =

Species of gastropod

Turbo petholatus (common name: tapestry turban) is a species of sea snail, marine gastropod mollusk in the family Turbinidae.

== Description ==
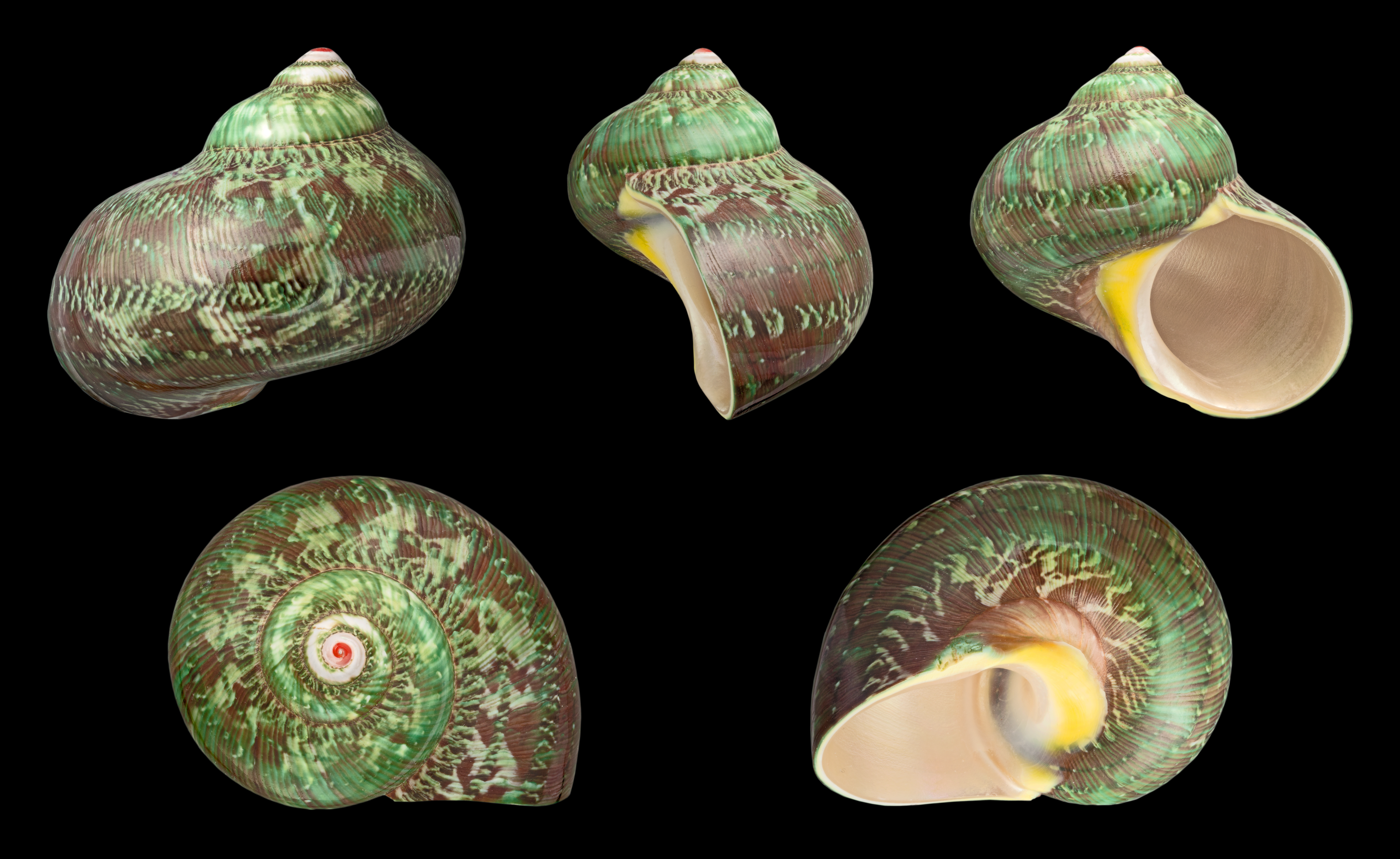
Green form

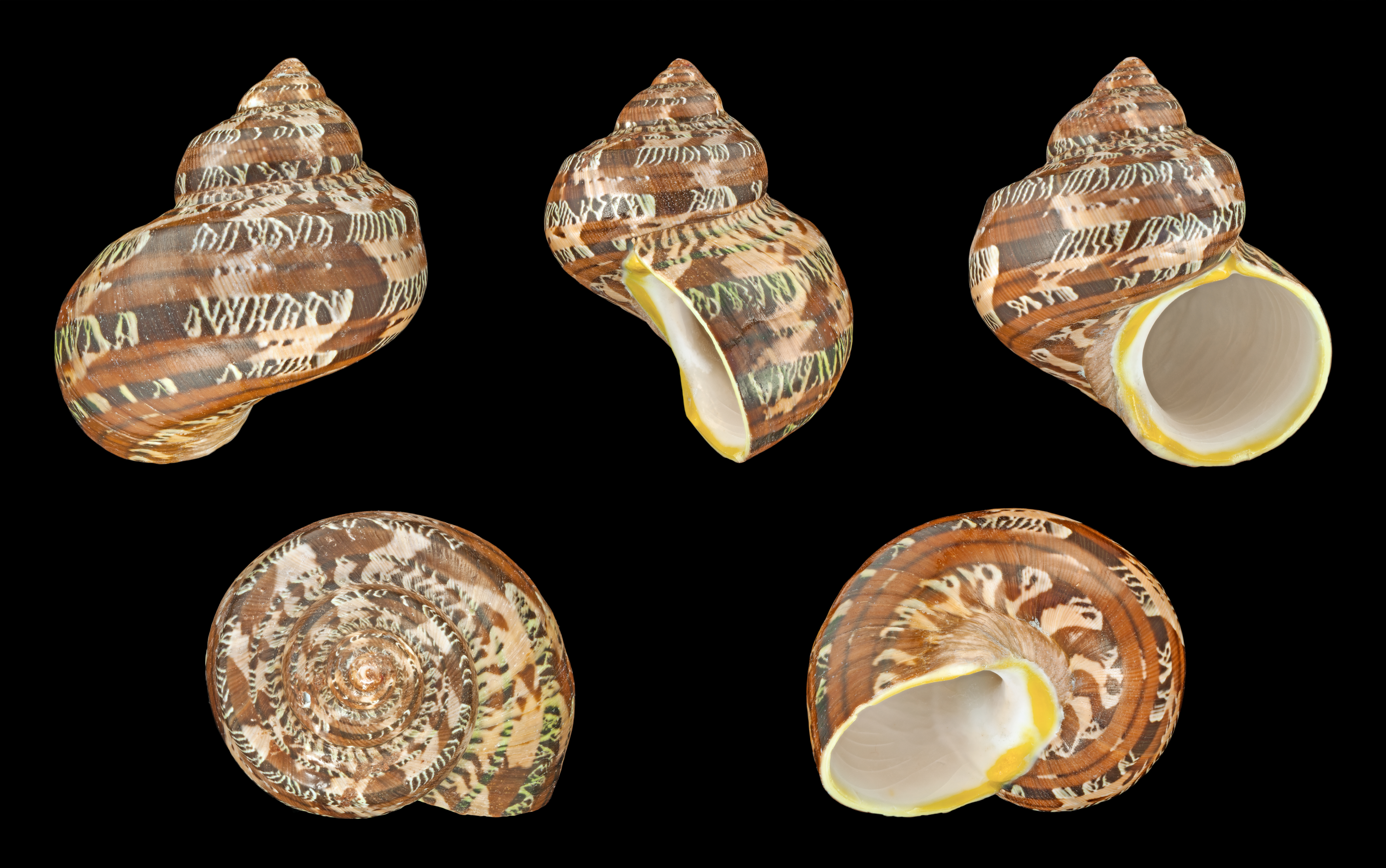
Brown form

The length of the shell varies between 30 mm and 100 mm. The imperforate shell is solid, polished and shining. Its color pattern is rich brown, variously ornamented with dark bands interrupted with white blotches and narrow stripes. The five whorls are flattened beneath the suture, sometimes carinated above. The aperture measures about half the length of the shell. It is circular and pearly within. The peristome and columella are tinged with greenish-yellow. The pattern on the shell is very similar to Turbo moolenbeeki, especially in the brown form Turbo petholathus.

The circular operculum contains four whorls and a nucleus placed one-third the distance across the face. The outer surface is convex, shining, bright green on the center, the margins brown on one side, white upon the other, slightly granulose about the edges.

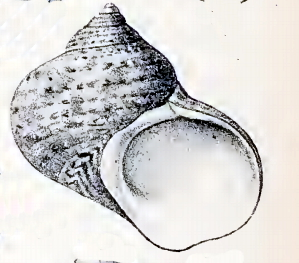
Drawing of a shell of Turbo petholatus

== Distribution ==
This species occurs in the Red Sea and in the Indian Ocean off Madagascar, Mozambique, Chagos and Mauritius. It also occurs also in the West Pacific and from Western Australia to southern Queensland.
