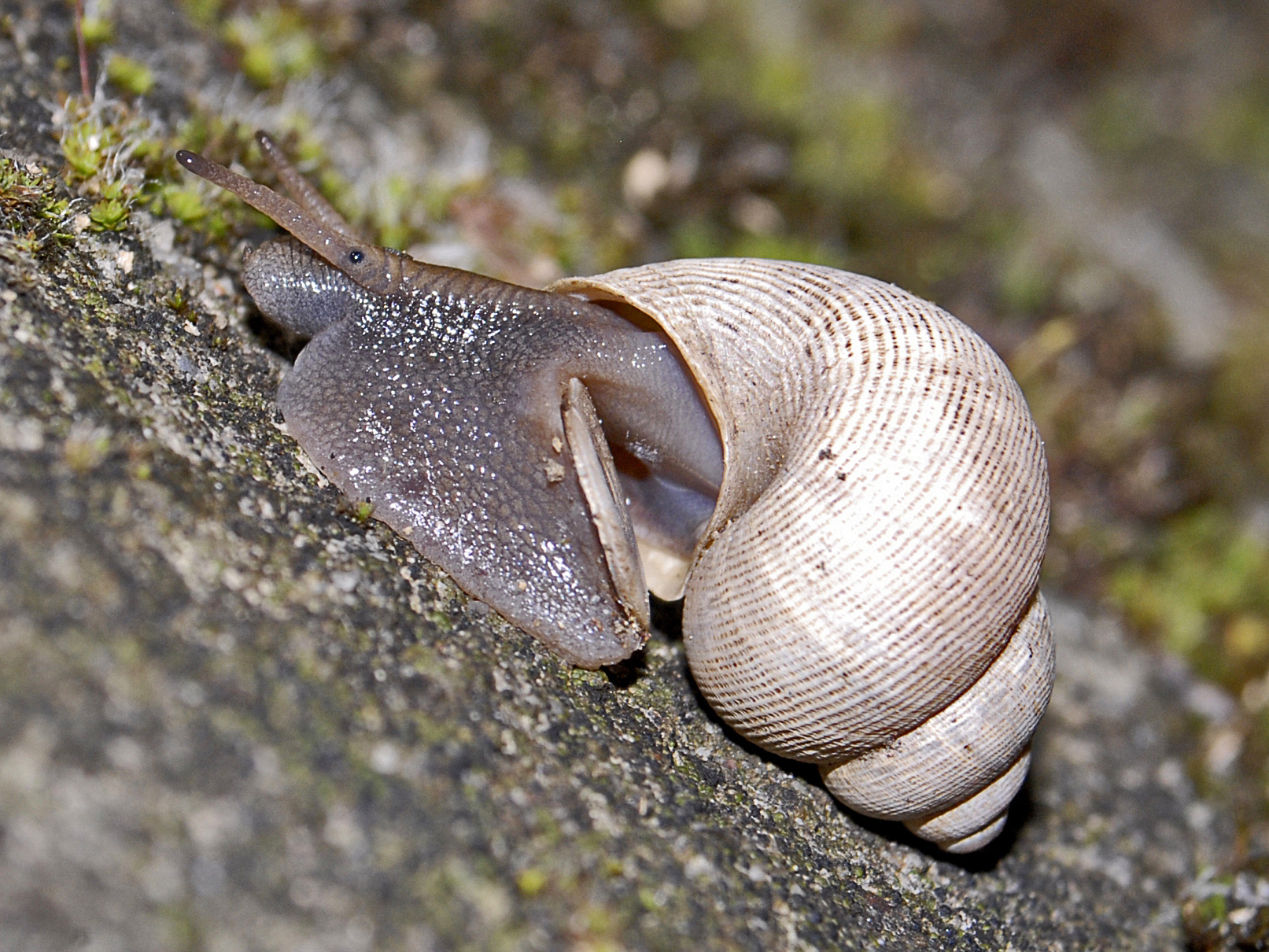
- A live and active individual of Pomatias elegans; note how the back of the shell rests on the operculum on the upper surface of the tail

Conservation status
- Least Concern (IUCN 3.1)

Scientific classification
- Kingdom: Animalia
- Phylum: Mollusca
- Class: Gastropoda
- Subclass: Caenogastropoda
- Order: Littorinimorpha
- Family: Pomatiidae
- Genus: Pomatias
- Species: P. elegans

Binomial name
- Pomatias elegans (Müller, 1774)

Synonyms
- Cyclostoma elegans

= Pomatias elegans =

Species of gastropod

Pomatias elegans, commonly known as the round-mouthed snail, is a species of small land snail with an operculum, a terrestrial gastropod mollusk in the family Pomatiidae within the superfamily Littorinoidea, the winkles and their allies.

This species is sometimes called a "land winkle".

== Distribution ==
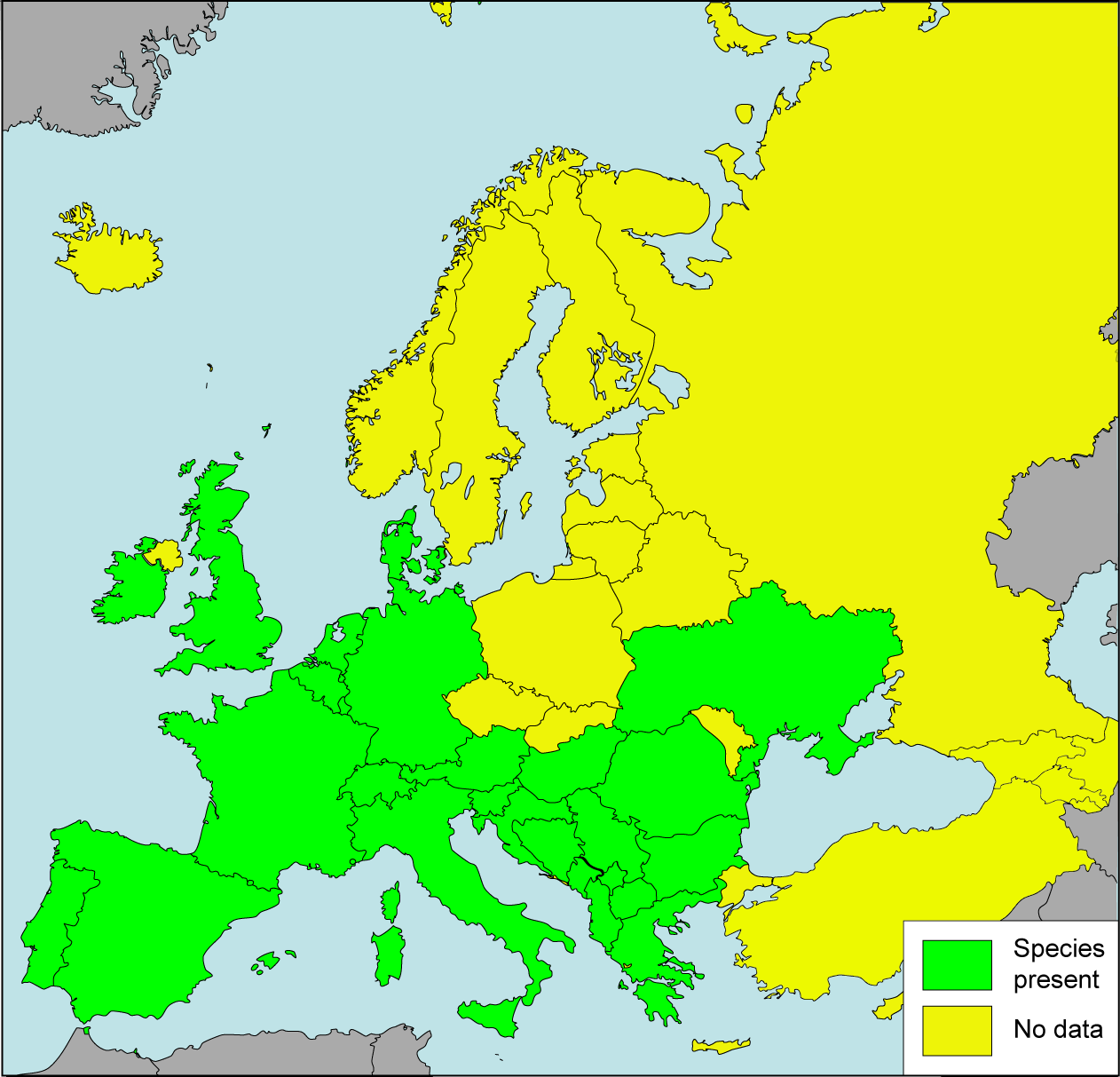
Presence of Pomatias elegans in European countries.

This species is very common in Southern Europe. Its overall distribution extends as far east as Istanbul and across the Bosphorus from there. It is uncommon in Britain and central Europe. Its distribution in North Africa is poorly documented.

== Description ==
The shell of this species is thick-walled, ovoid and slightly conical. It is composed of 4 ½ - 5 convex spires with the last one as the largest one. The surface of the shell is reticulated with dark spots and discontinued bands of beige and violet colours. The thick and chalky operculum has an eccentric calcified nucleus, and bears a spiral sculpture. The length of the shells varies between 12.5 mm and 15.8 mm and its diameter between 7 mm and 11.5 mm.

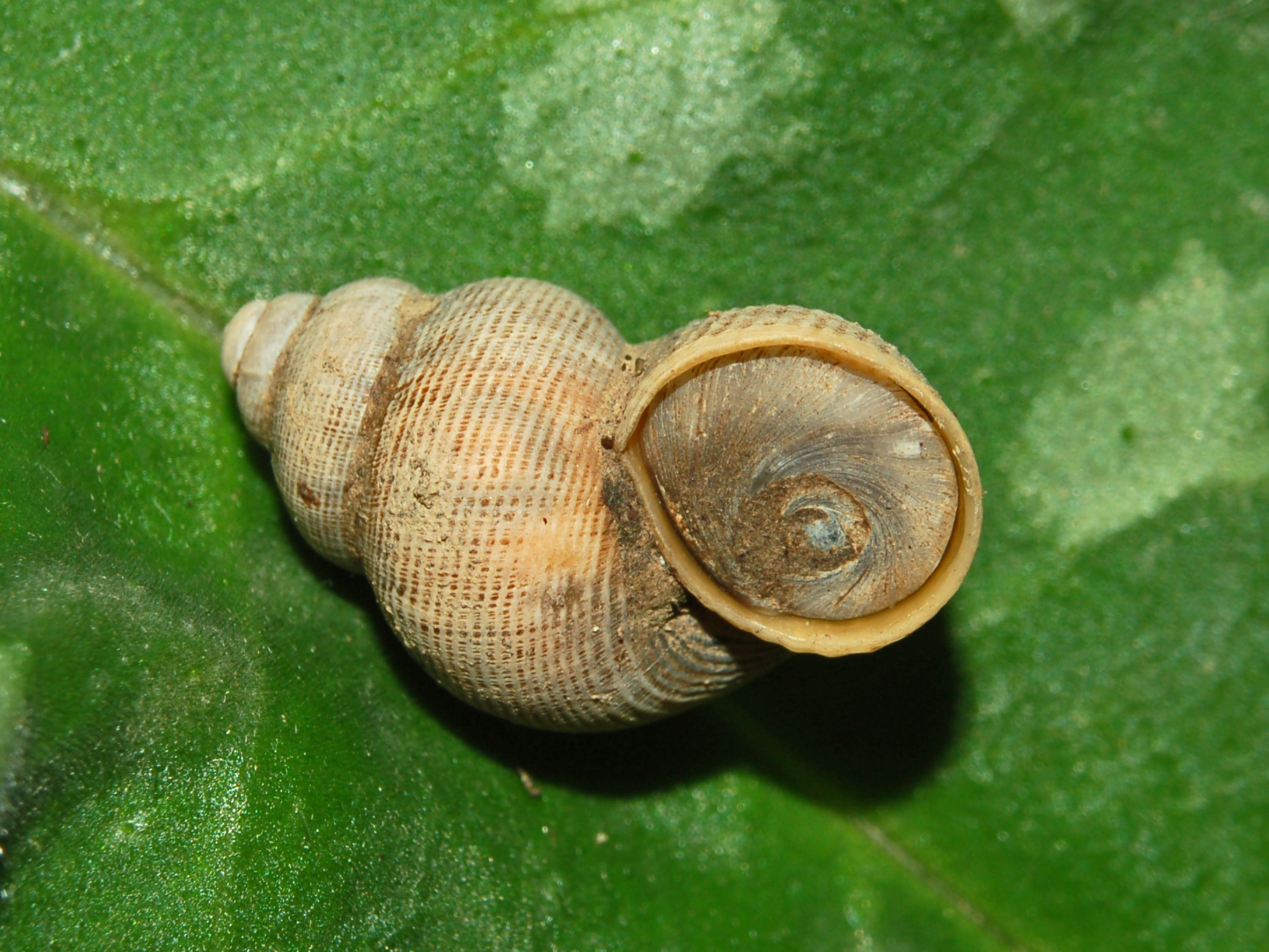
Live but retracted individual showing shell and operculum with its eccentric nucleus

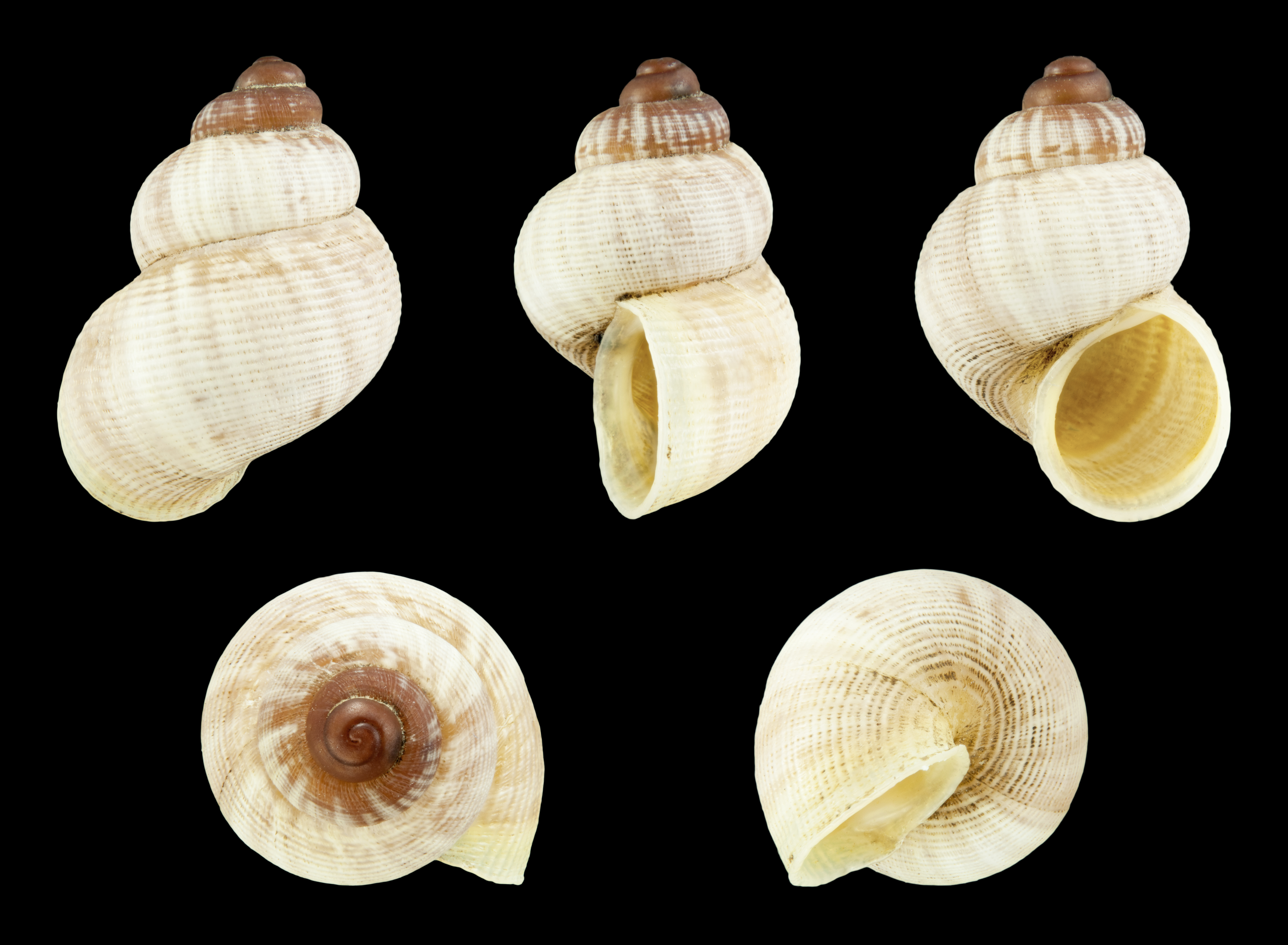
Shell

The waves of contractions on the surface of the foot are longitudinal, passing from side to side.

Pomatias elegans in motion

== Ecology ==
This snail lives only in areas where there are high levels of calcium carbonate such as on limestone or chalk rock, and where there is loose and friable soil. This snail is also sometimes found in coastal sand dunes where the sand has many shell fragments mixed in.

== Conservation status ==
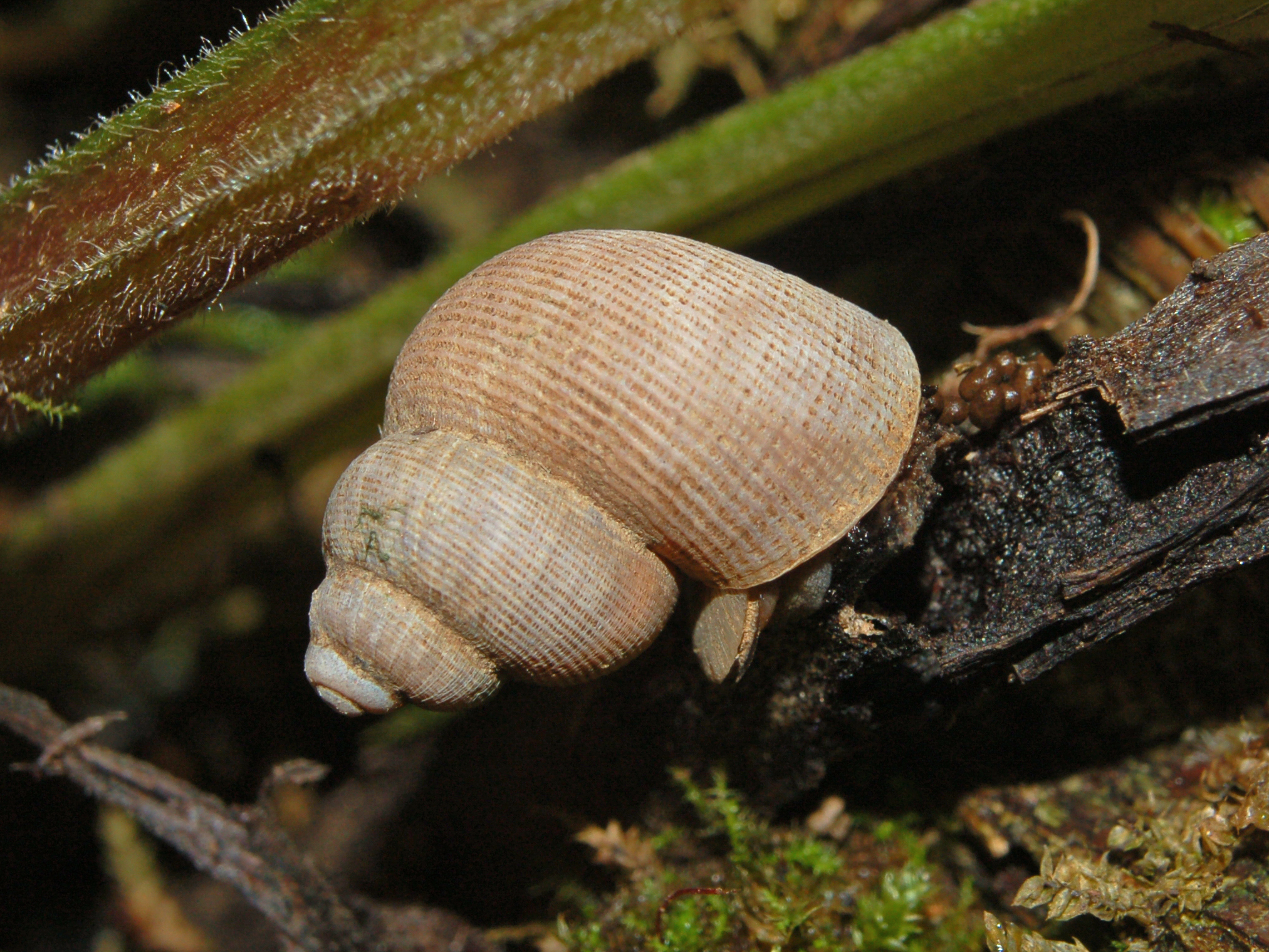
A live but inactive individual of Pomatias elegans

The survival of this species is threatened in Central Europe by intensive farming, also in vineyards by habitat destruction, fertilizers, insecticides, herbicides and fungicides. The species has seriously declined in central and eastern England. This species is endangered in Switzerland and Ireland, and vulnerable in Germany.
