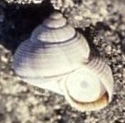
- A live but retracted individual of Tropidophora fimbriata haemostoma, showing the operculum in the aperture

Scientific classification
- Kingdom: Animalia
- Phylum: Mollusca
- Class: Gastropoda
- Subclass: Caenogastropoda
- Order: Littorinimorpha
- Family: Pomatiidae
- Genus: Tropidophora
- Species: T. fimbriata

Binomial name
- Tropidophora fimbriata (Lamarck, 1822)

Synonyms
- Cyclostoma fimbriata Lamarck, 1822

= Tropidophora fimbriata =

Species of gastropod

Tropidophora fimbriata is a species of land snail with a gill and an operculum, a terrestrial gastropod mollusk in the family Pomatiidae.

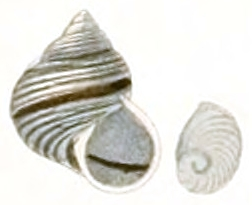
1846 drawing of the shell of Tropidophora fimbriata with its calcareous operculum by Ludwig Karl Georg Pfeiffer.

This species is found in the Mascarenes. Subspecies include T. f. rodriguesensis and T. f. haemostoma.

== Original description ==
Tropidophora fimbriata was originally described as Cyclostoma fimbriata by Jean-Baptiste Lamarck in 1822.

Lamarck's original text (the type description) in Latin language reads as follows:

C. testa ventricoso-conoidea, subperforata, transversim striata, albido-lutescente;

anfractuum margine superiore plicis fimbriato; spira brevi, acuta; apertura lutea. —

Lat. bas. 5½ lin.
