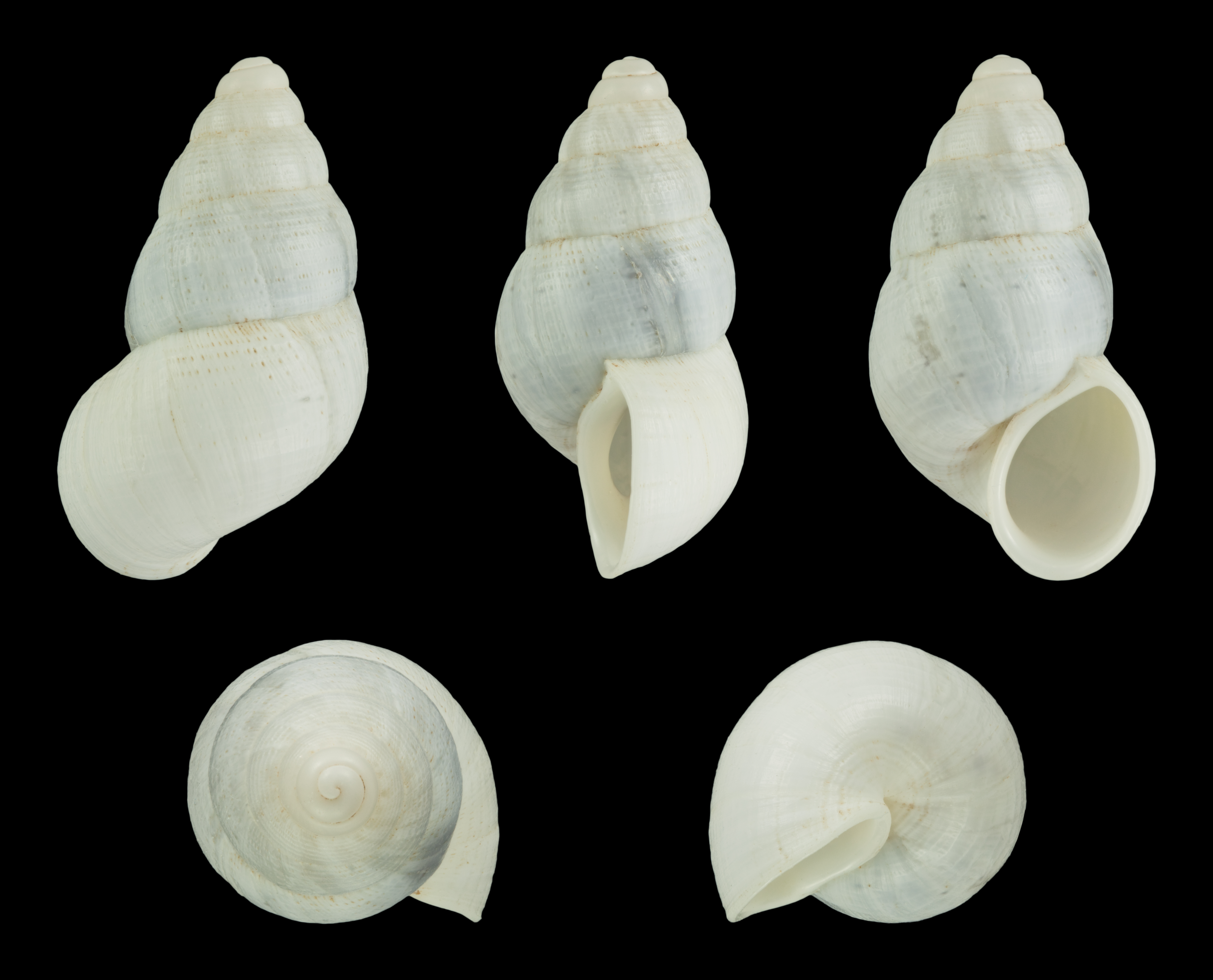
- Leonia mammillaris

Scientific classification
- Kingdom: Animalia
- Phylum: Mollusca
- Class: Gastropoda
- Subclass: Caenogastropoda
- Order: Littorinimorpha
- Family: Pomatiidae
- Genus: Leonia; Gray, 1850

= Leonia (gastropod) =

Genus of land snails

Leonia is a genus of gastropods belonging to the family Pomatiidae.

The species of this genus are found in Mediterranean and North Africa.

Species:

- Leonia mamillaris (Lamarck, 1822)
- Leonia scrobiculata (Mousson, 1873)
