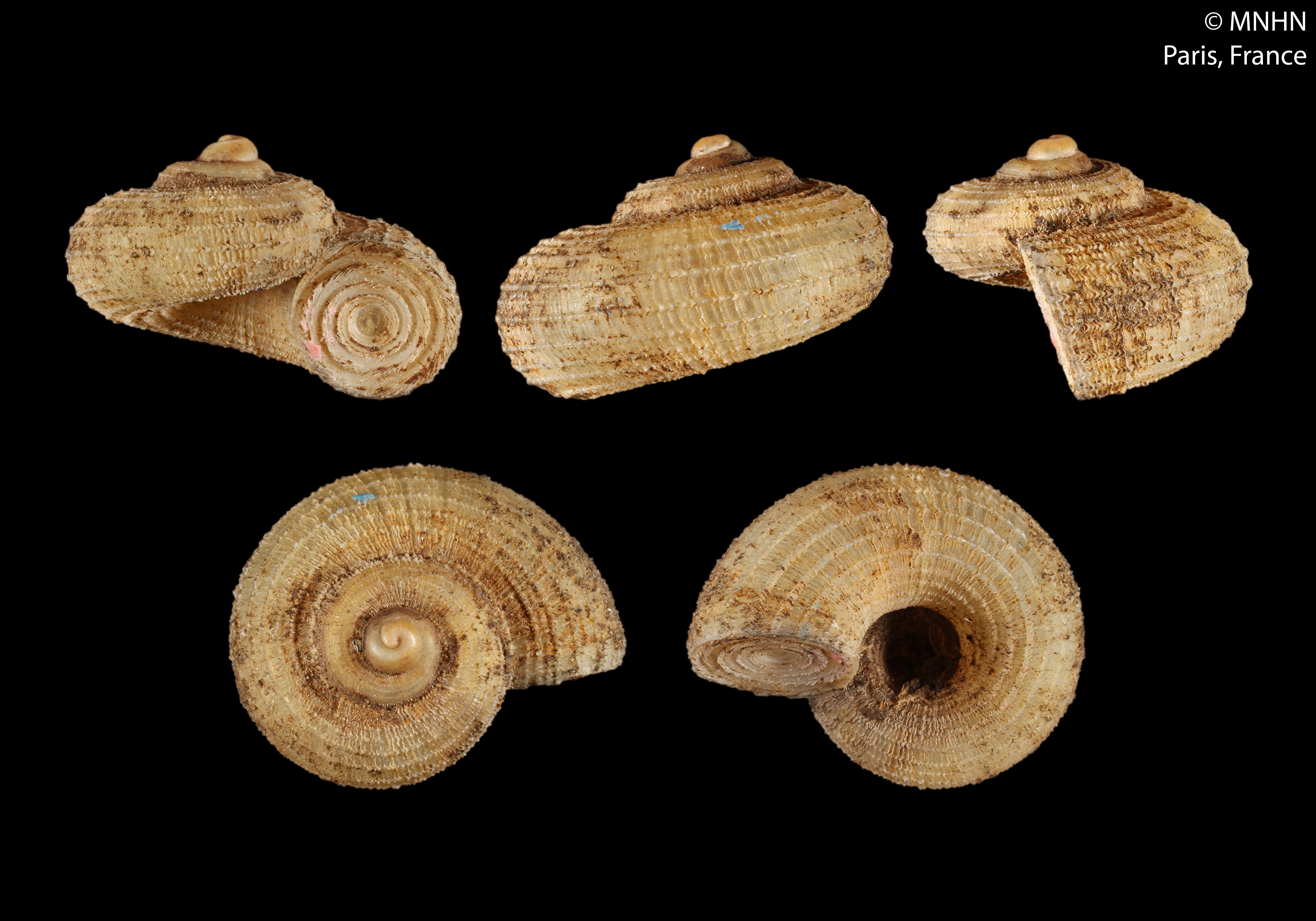
- Shell of Cyclotopsis milloti (holotype at MNHN, Paris)

Scientific classification
- Kingdom: Animalia
- Phylum: Mollusca
- Class: Gastropoda
- Subclass: Caenogastropoda
- Order: Littorinimorpha
- Superfamily: Littorinoidea
- Family: Pomatiidae
- Genus: Cyclotopsis; W. T. Blanford, 1864

Type species
- Cyclostoma semistriatum G. B. Sowerby I, 1843

= Cyclotopsis =

Genus of gastropods

Cyclotopsis is a genus of small sea snails, marine gastropod mollusks in the family Tornidae.

== Species ==
Species within the genus Cyclotopsis include:

- Cyclotopsis beviae Fischer-Piette, Blanc, C.P., Blanc, F. & Salvat, 1993
- Cyclotopsis conoidea (L. Pfeiffer, 1846)
- Cyclotopsis filicum Morelet, 1877
- Cyclotopsis horrida Morelet, 1888
- Cyclotopsis josephinae Emberton, 2003
- Cyclotopsis mermosi Fischer-Piette, Blanc, C.P., Blanc, F. & Salvat, 1993
- Cyclotopsis miaryi Fischer-Piette, Blanc, C.P., Blanc, F. & Salvat, 1993
- Cyclotopsis milloti Fischer-Piette, Blanc, F. & Vukadinovic, 1974
- Cyclotopsis montana (L. Pfeiffer, 1855)
- Cyclotopsis nevilli Morelet, 1877
- Cyclotopsis orchidae Emberton, 2003
- Cyclotopsis semistriata (G. B. Sowerby I, 1842)
- Cyclotopsis spurca (Grateloup, 1840)
- Cyclotopsis subdiscoidea (G. B. Sowerby I, 1850)
- Cyclotopsis trailii (L. Pfeiffer, 1862)
- Cyclotopsis tsaratananae Emberton, 2003
