= Samuel Emanuel Studer =

Swiss malacologist (1757–1834)

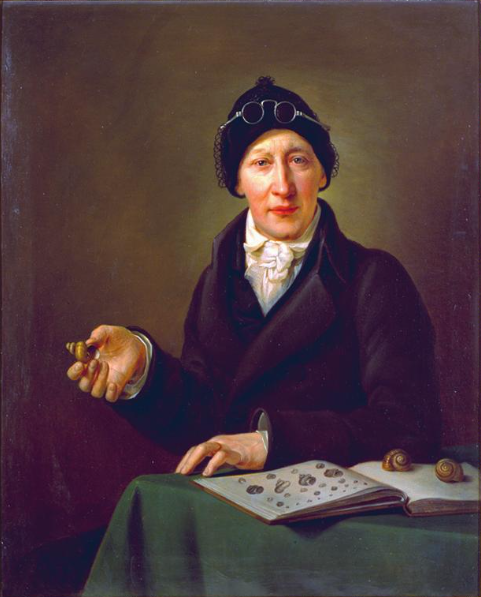
Portrait by Pieter Recco, 1816

Samuel Emanuel Studer (18 November 1757 – 21 August 1834) was a Swiss malacologist, pastor and theologian. He named various taxa of molluscs, such as the land snail genus Pomatias.

== Biography ==
Studer was born in Bern on 18 November 1757, the son of Samuel Studer, a butcher, and Maria Magdalena Hartmann. His younger brother, Sigmund Gottlieb Studer, was a notary, landscape artist and the father of Gottlieb Samuel Studer. Studer studied theology at the Hohe Schule (High School) in Bern from 1771 to 1781. Ordained in 1781, he was preacher at Bern's Burgerspital (Citizens' Hospital) before serving as pastor of Büren an der Aare from 1789 to 1796. Studer then became a professor at the Academy of Bern, teaching practical theology from 1796 and homiletics between 1805 and 1827. He became the first dean of the Bernese Church in 1827.

Encouraged by ornithologist Daniel Sprüngli and naturalist Jakob Samuel Wyttenbach, Studer took an early interest in the natural sciences. He undertook numerous expeditions to the Bernese Oberland and the Valais, took daily weather records from 1779 to 1827, and conducted research in entomology. Studer was the first to study Switzerland's mollusk fauna, building a systematic conchological collection (now in the Natural History Museum of Bern). He was one of the first proponents of the theory of evolution. Studer was a member of the Economic Society of Bern from 1786, a founding member of the Swiss Society of Natural Sciences from 1815, and a doctor honoris causa from the universities of Erlangen (1801) and Basel (1828). He died in Bern on 21 August 1834, aged 76.

== Marriage and issue ==
Studer married Maria Margaretha Walther, the daughter of ironmaster Friedrich Walther, in 1789. They were the parents of geologist Bernhard Studer and theologian Gottlieb Ludwig Studer.

== Works ==
- Studer, S. 1820. Kurzes Verzeichniss der bis jetzt in unserm Vaterlande entdeckten Conchylien. Naturwissenschaftlicher Anzeiger der Allgemeinen Schweizerischen Gesellschaft für die Gesammten Naturwissenschaften 3 (11): 83-90, 91-94. Bern.
- contributions to Coxe, W, 1789. Travels in Switzerland, in a series of letters to William Melmoth, Esq. In three volumes. Vol. III. - pp. I-VIII [= 1-8], I-IV [= 1-4], 1-446. London. (Cadell).
