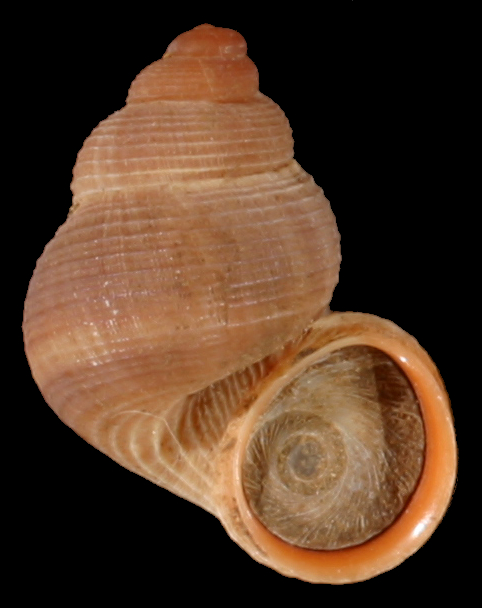
- Apertural view of a shell and an operculum of the land snail Tudorella sulcata in the family Pomatiidae

Scientific classification
- Domain: Eukaryota
- Kingdom: Animalia
- Phylum: Mollusca
- Class: Gastropoda
- Subclass: Caenogastropoda
- Order: Littorinimorpha
- Superfamily: Littorinoidea
- Family: Pomatiidae; Newton, 1891 (1828)

Genera
- See text

Synonyms
- Cyclostomatidae Menke, 1828; Cyclotopsinae Kobelt & Möllendorff, 1898; Ericiidae Wenz, 1915

= Pomatiidae =

Family of gastropods

The family Pomatiidae is a taxonomic family of small operculate land snails, terrestrial gastropod mollusks that can be found over the warmer parts of the Old World. In the older literature, this family is designated as Pomatiasidae.

This family is a lineage closely related to the Littorinidae (periwinkles) common in coastal habitat. They have adapted to terrestrial life and are thus sometimes called "land winkles".

They are defined by a chalky operculum at the rear end of the body, the shape of their thick shell and their mouth and a characteristic spiral sculpture. The sexes are separate and can sometimes be recognised because the female shell is slightly larger than the male shell.

== Taxonomy ==
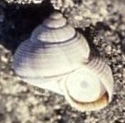
Tropidophora fimbriata haemostoma.

According to the Taxonomy of the Gastropoda (Bouchet & Rocroi, 2005), the family Pomatiidae consisted of two subfamilies:

- subfamily Pomatiinae Newton, 1891 (1828) - synonyms: Cyclostomatidae Menke, 1828; Cyclotopsinae Kobelt & Möllendorff, 1898; Ericiidae Wenz, 1915
- subfamily Annulariinae Henderson & Bartsch, 1941, 1920: this subfamily has been raised to the rank of family Annulariidae.

== Genera ==
Genera within the family Pomatiidae include:

- † Anapomatias Hrubesch, 1965
- † Bauxia Caziot, 1891
- † Bembridgia P. Fischer, 1885
- Bermudezia Torre & Bartsch, 1941
- Chondrothyrella Torre and Bartsch, 1938
- Cinnabarica Neubert, 2009
- Clatripoma Neubert, 2009
- Cyclostoma Lamarck, 1899
- Cyclotopsis Blanford, 1864
- Dioscopoma Neubert, 2009
- † Dissostoma Cossmann, 1888
- Ericia Partiot, 1848: synonym of Pomatias S. Studer, 1789
- Georgia Bourguignat, 1882: synonym of Socotora Pallary, 1925
- Guillainia Crosse, 1884
- Leonia Gray, 1850
- Lithidion Gray, 1850
- † Omanitopsis Harzhauser & Neubauer, 2016
- † Palaeocyclotus P. Fischer, 1885
- Platypoma Neubert, 2009
- Pomatias Studer, 1789 - type genus of the family Pomatiidae
- † Procyclotopsis Wenz, 1924
- Rochebrunia Bourguignat, 1881
- Socotora Pallary, 1925
- Tropidophora Troschel, 1847
- Tudorella Fischer, 1885
