= Operculum (gastropod) =

Feature of gastropod anatomy

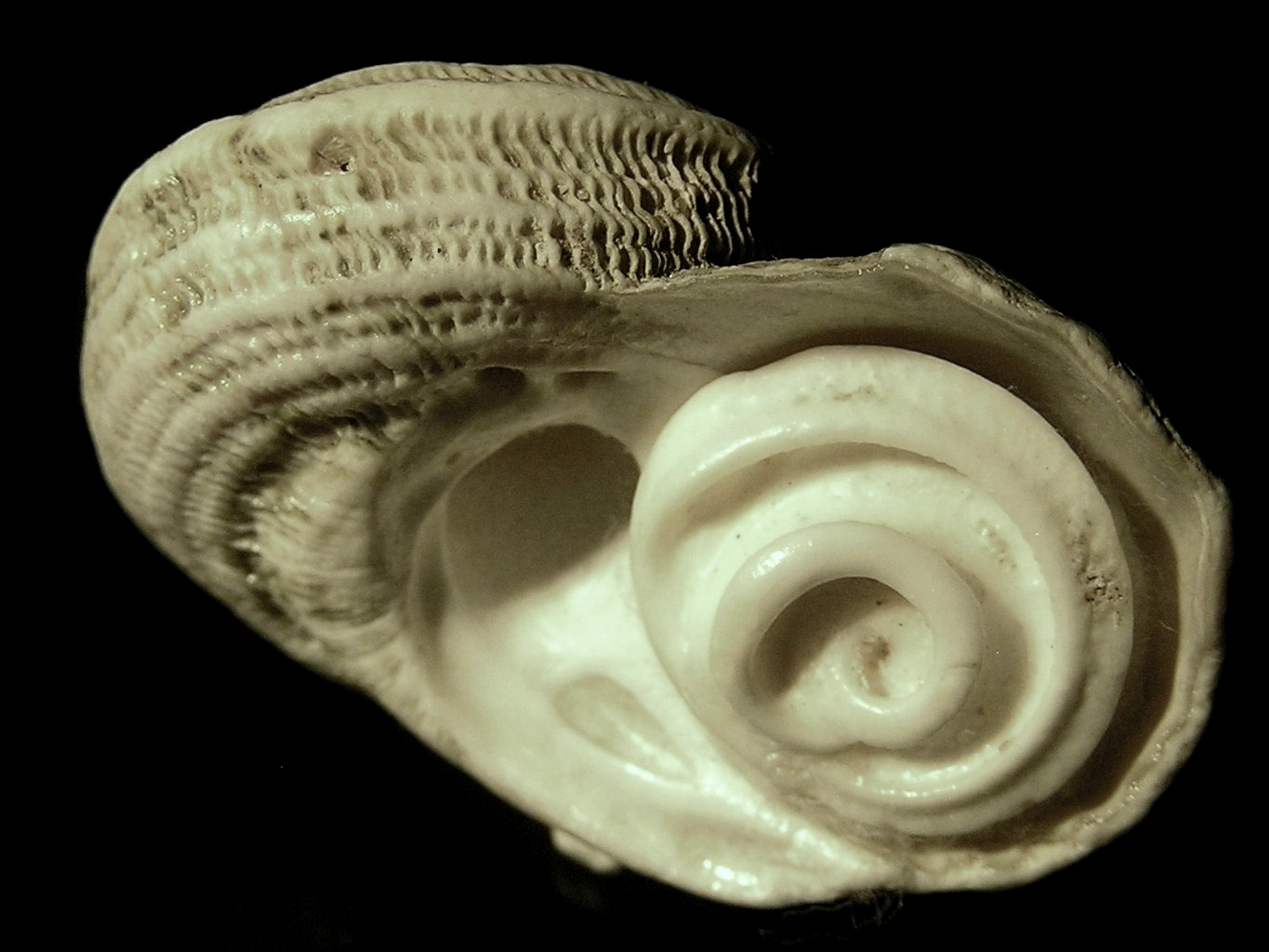
Shell of marine snail Lunella torquata with the calcareous operculum in place

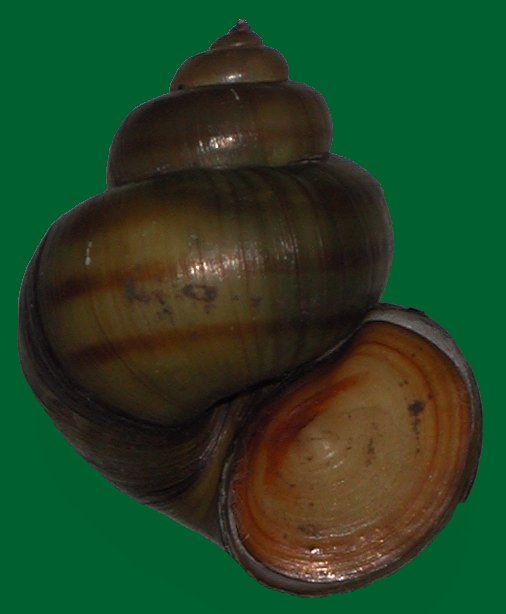
Gastropod shell of the freshwater snail Viviparus contectus with corneous operculum in place

An operculum (Latin for 'cover, covering'; pl. opercula or operculums) is a corneous or calcareous anatomical structure like a trapdoor that exists in many (but not all) groups of sea snails and freshwater snails, and also in a few groups of land snails, including the Helicinidae, Cyclophoridae, Aciculidae, Maizaniidae and Pomatiidae.

The operculum is attached to the upper surface of the foot and in its most complete state, it serves as a sort of "trapdoor" to close the aperture of the shell when the soft parts of the animal are retracted. The shape of the operculum varies greatly from one family of gastropods to another. It is fairly often circular, or more or less oval in shape. In species where the operculum fits snugly, its outline corresponds exactly to the shape of the aperture of the shell and it serves to seal the entrance of the shell.

Many families have opercula that are reduced in size, and which are not capable of closing the shell aperture. Opercula have sometimes been modified: in the Strombidae the operculum is claw-shaped and is used to push into the substrate in a leaping form of locomotion.

Virtually all pulmonate snails are inoperculate, i.e. they do not have an operculum, with the exception of the Amphiboloidea. However, some terrestrial pulmonate species are capable of secreting an epiphragm, a temporary structure that can in some cases serve some of the same functions as an operculum. The epiphragm may be distinguished from the true operculum by its homogeneity and want of growth marks.

In ammonites (extinct shelled cephalopods), a calcareous structure known as the aptychus (plural aptychi) existed. When these were first described they were thought to be valves of a bivalve species, then for many years after that they were considered to be a form of paired or single operculum-like structures belonging to ammonites. More recently the aptychus or paired aptychi have been hypothesized to be a jaw apparatus of ammonites.

== Functions ==
Perhaps the most essential function of the operculum in gastropods is to allow snails to resist drying out, or desiccation. This is very important in intertidal marine snails during low tide, and this also enables operculate freshwater and land snails to survive periods of drought and dry weather.

In those marine species where the operculum completely seals the shell, it can also serve as a protection against predators when the snail body is retracted.

== Anatomy ==
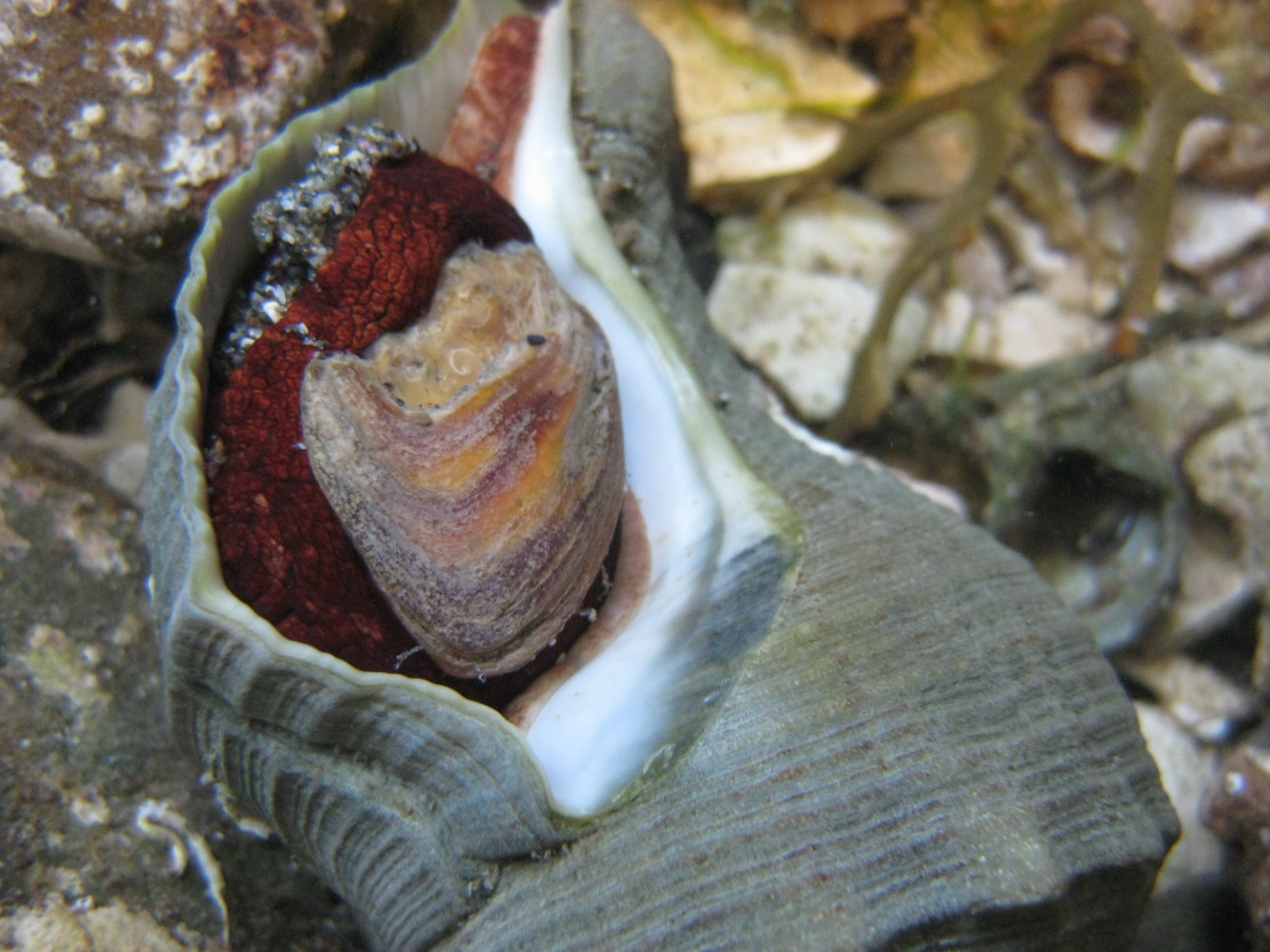
Penion sulcatus near Goat Island, New Zealand, with a damaged operculum

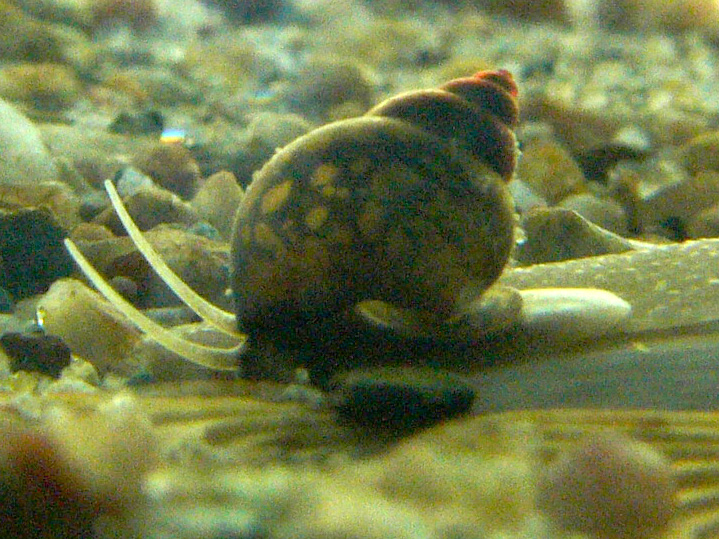
Freshwater snail Bithynia tentaculata, showing how the back of the shell rests on the round operculum on top of the foot as the snail moves along

In life, the operculum is attached at the ending of the columellar muscle with an opercular disc dorsally to the upper surface of the posterior part of the foot. However, in Buccinum a layer of long cylindrical epithelial cells, with mostly distinct nuclei, and long divided processes enter between the muscular fibres. The operculum, a cuticular development of these cells, is composed, as may be seen in the corneous opercula of Murex, Purpura, Triton, of very thin superimposed layers. The cylindrical cells are attached with their head to the lowermost layer.

The operculum grows in size as the shell grows, such that the operculum remains in proportion to the apertural size. In many species, when the animal is active and crawling, part of the underside of the shell rests on the outer surface of the operculum.

In many species of marine shelled snails which live subtidally, the operculum is greatly reduced in size, and no longer serves to seal the shell entrance. In a large number of families it has been eliminated completely.

In species of conchs, the operculum is elongated and sickle-shaped, and is used to dig into the sand to enable the conch to perform a leaping type of locomotion.

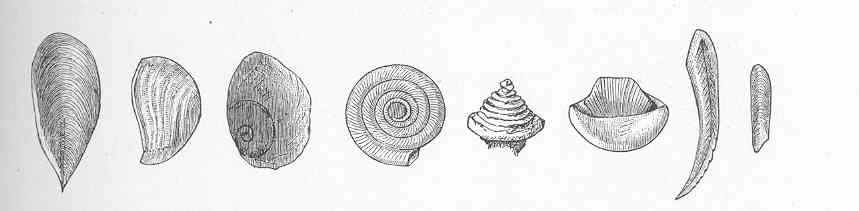
Various forms of opercula in Pyrula; Purpura; Littorina; Aulopoma; Torinia; Neritopsis; Strombus; Conus

The structure of the operculum can be described as follows:

- concentric: the nucleus is central or subcentral as in Lithoglyphus and Ampullaria, and in other the nucleus is near the parietal margin of the shell.
- imbricated, or lamellar: when it grows only on one side, and the nucleus is marginal, as in Purpura, Xenophora, and Paludomus.
- claw-shaped, or unguiculate: with the nucleus apical or in front, as in Turbinella and Fusus; it is claw-shaped and serrated in Strombus
- spiral: when it grows only on one edge, and revolves as it grows; it is always sinistral in dextral shells.
- paucispiral or oligogyrous: with few spirals as in Littorina.
- subspiral or scarcely spiral, in Thiara
- multispiral or polygyrous: having many closely spaced spirals as in Trochus where they sometimes amount to twenty; the number of turns which the operculum makes is not determined by the number of whorls in the shell, but by the curvature of the aperture, and the necessity that the operculum should revolve fast enough to fit it constantly.
- articulated, when it has a projection, as in Nerita
- radiated is a modification of the articulated operculum in which the spiral is not so evident as in Navicella
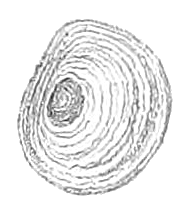
Example of a concentric operculum (Filopaludina martensi)

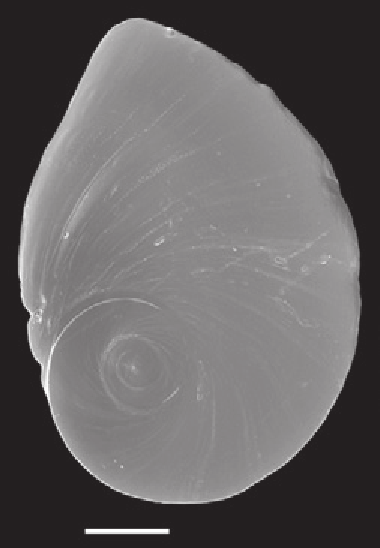
Example of a polygyrous spiral with eccentric nucleus in the operculum of Marstonia comalensis, scale bar: 200 μm

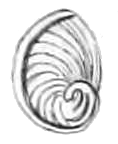
Example of an oligogyrous spiral in Cremnoconchus syhadrensis

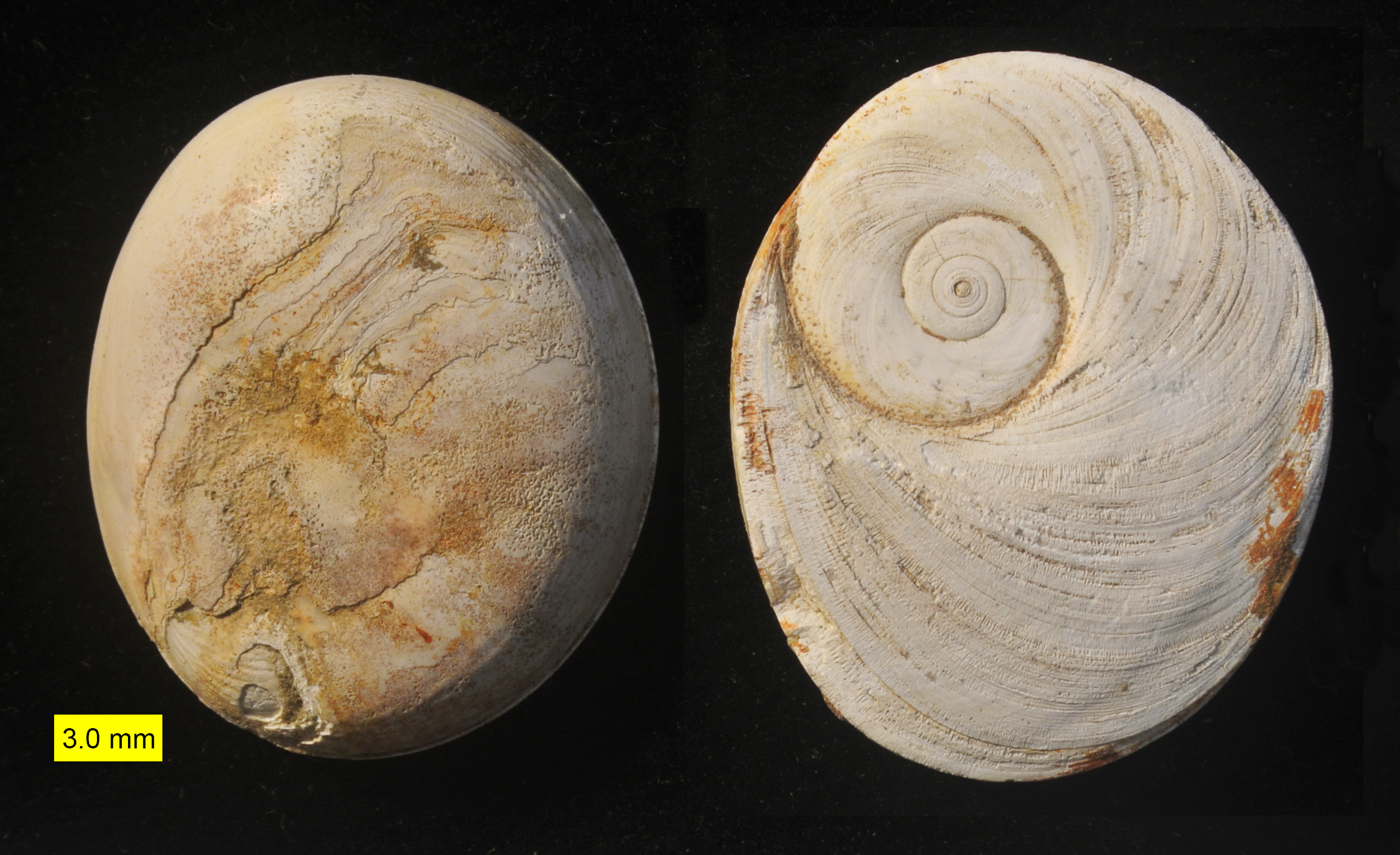
Fossil spiral opercula (both sides) from the Pliocene of Cyprus

In 1998 Checa and Jimeneze proposed three types of opercula:

- type 1: flexiclaudent spiral (mostly multispiral) operculum; its shape does not coincide with the aperture but fits by flexing into the aperture; predominantly present in archaeogastropods.
- type 2: rigiclaudent spiral (usually paucispiral) operculum; its shape fitting the aperture; present in archaeogastropods, but predominating in Caenogastropoda.
- type 3: rigiclaudent concentric operculum; its shape fitting the aperture; predominant in higher neotaenioglossans and exclusive in neogastropods.

There are two basic types of opercula in terms of their material composition:

- The most common kind of operculum is composed of a thin to rather thick corneous protein material, which is yellow to brownish in color and is usually somewhat translucent. This matter is supple when in its natural state but may become brittle when it is dried out. The operculum varies in shape, depending on the family of snails and the shape of the aperture of their shells.

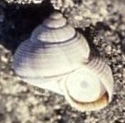
Land snail Tropidophora fimbriata haemostoma showing the calcareous operculum

- The other kind of operculum is restricted to a few families of gastropods including the Turbinidae. This operculum structure has a corneous base with a heavy calcareous overlay. The calcareous surface in some genera has color or ornamentation of various kinds including, for example, pustules and incised grooves.

The different shapes of opercula can include ungulate (hooflike), claw-like, or ovate. The type and shape of the operculum is used to help identify and classify related groups (genera) of land operculates, and likewise some marine operculates.

== Human uses ==
The oldest known human depiction of an operculum together with the shell of Charonia tritonis is a seal made by the Minoan civilization.

=== As incense material ===
Opercula of certain gastropods, especially varieties from the Red Sea, have long served as an incense material in ancient Jewish tradition, as well as Arabian cultures. The operculum of conch species Strombus tricornis and Lambis truncata sebae are most commonly used in regions near the Middle East. Opercula from these conches may be the onycha incense material which is described in the Book of Exodus.

Operculum powder is also an important ingredient in Chinese and Japanese incense making. Here it is called "bèi xiāng" (Chinese: 貝香; lit. sea shell fragrance) or "kai kou" (Japanese: 甲香, lit. shell/armour fragrance) respectively. Incense producers in these countries use the operculum of many conches and other marine snails, including those found in Southeast Asia, South America, and East Africa. The opercula are traditionally treated with vinegar, alcohol and water in order to remove any fishy smell. The clean opercula are then ground to a powder and used as a scent fixative, in a technique similar to that used in perfumes with certain plant resins.

When burnt on its own, high quality operculum reportedly smells of castoreum or other animal musks, while that of lower quality is reminiscent of burnt hair.

=== As a gemstone or decorative object ===
The operculum of certain species of Turbinidae is sometimes used as a very inexpensive organic "gemstone" in rings, bracelets, amulets etc. These opercula are commonly known as "cats eye" (or more recently "Shiva's eye").

The turban snail Turbo petholatus is the species whose operculum is most renowned, although other Turbo species are also used. The operculum has two sides of differing appearance. Either side or both may be displayed as jewelry or ornament. The internal side is flat and white, with a spiral suture line, while the external side is hemispherical, glossy, and variously colored and patterned. In the case of T. petholatus there is a prominent dark 'eye' and sometimes a greenish area.

Opercula are often used in Northwest Coast art of North America, as detailing in masks, panels and paddles. These objects are used to represent the teeth in masks, and are used as a decorative element in many of the objects which play an important part in the art and culture of Northwest Coast peoples, including dishes for food, bentwood boxes, and rattles.

Friedrich Ratzel in The History of Mankind reported in 1896 that, in Oceania, chains and girdles composed of the coloured opercula of certain shells were considered valuable ornaments.

=== As paperweights ===
The largest opercula of Turbo marmoratus have been used as paperweights.
