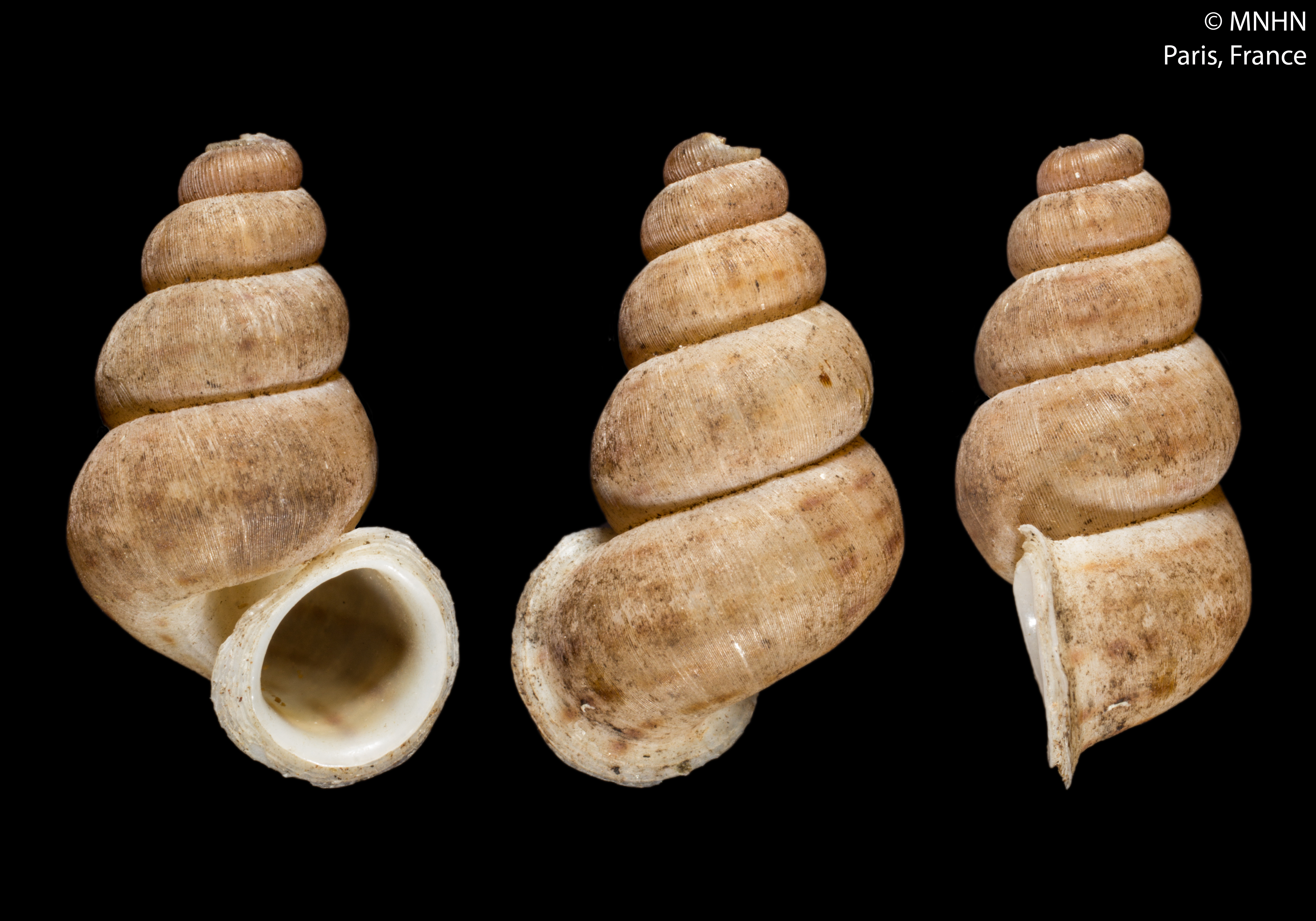
- Shell of Gouldipoma chiapasense (syntype at MNHN, Paris)

Scientific classification
- Kingdom: Animalia
- Phylum: Mollusca
- Class: Gastropoda
- Subclass: Caenogastropoda
- Order: Littorinimorpha
- Superfamily: Littorinoidea
- Family: Annulariidae; Henderson & Bartsch, 1920

Type species
- Annularia

Genera
- See text

= Annulariidae =

Family of gastropods

The family Annulariidae is a taxonomic family of small operculate land snails in the superfamily Littorinoidea.

== Characteristics ==
(Original description) This family encompasses all New World "Cyclostomoid" mollusks previously classified under the family names Cyclostomatidae or Eriidae.

Key Distinguishing Characteristics: The primary feature that separates this family from all other operculate pulmonates is found in the radula (the rasping tongue), which exhibits a fundamental uniformity across the large number of included species.

Radula Structure
the radula possesses a consistent tooth arrangement:

- Rachidian tooth: single and unicuspid.
- Lateral tooth: single and unicuspid.
- Inner marginal tooth: resembles the lateral tooth in form but is multicuspid.
- Outer Mmrginal tooth: long and curved like a bow (arcuate). It is pectinated (comb-like) on both its recurved edge and its main portion, but these pectinations do not divide it into individual teeth.
- Jaw: absent.

Foot and progression
The sole of the foot is longitudinally divided by a sulcus (groove), which separates it into two muscular masses. These two masses function independently, allowing the animal a method of progression by alternate waves of muscular contraction (first on one side, then on the other). The foot is relatively short.
Head and sensory organs

- Muzzle: a bifid (forked) muzzle of varying length is always present.
- Tentacles: they are long, slender, and either fibrillar or slightly swollen at the ends.
- Eyes: The eyes are situated at the base of the tentacles on the outer side. They are often raised above the surface of the head by a fleshy protuberance.

Operculum
The operculum displays a wide degree of variation across the family's divisions, yet it follows distinct evolutionary lines of progression. The structure ranges from a simple type to a highly complicated one, with intermediate steps easily traceable. All opercula possess a basal chondroid plate (cartilaginous base) upon which calcareous ribs and lamellae (thin plates) are deposited. Modifications of these calcareous structures are used to subdivide the family into a series of subfamilies and genera, as will be discussed below.

Shell
The shell shape varies widely, from depressed helicoid (flat, spiral like a snail) to elongate conic. The surface sculpture varies greatly: from axially ribbed only to axially ribbed and spirally lirate (with fine spiral lines). The intensity of these elements ranges from obsolete (faint) to lamellose (layered/plate-like).

== Genera ==
Subfamily Abbottellinae Watters, 2016

- Abbottella Henderson & Bartsch, 1920
- Abbottipoma Watters, M. L. Smith & Sneddon, 2020
- Annularisca Henderson & Bartsch, 1920
- Arenabbottella Watters, M. L. Smith & Sneddon, 2020
- Lagopoma Bartsch, 1946
- Leiabbottella Watters, 2010
- Meganipha F. G. Thompson, 1978
- Microabbottella Watters, M. L. Smith & Sneddon, 2020
- Opisthosiphon Dall, 1905
- Preclaripoma Watters, M. L. Smith & Sneddon, 2020
- Rolleia Crosse, 1891

Subfamily Annulariinae Henderson & Bartsch, 1920

- Adamsiella L. Pfeiffer, 1851
- Annularia Schumacher, 1817
- Annularops Henderson & Bartsch, 1920
- Blaesospira Crosse, 1891
- Chittypoma Watters, 2006
- Cistulops H. B. Baker, 1924
- Eyerdamia Bartsch, 1946
- Juannularia de la Torre & Bartsch, 1941
- Lugarenia de la Torre & Bartsch, 1941
- Megannularia Watters, 2006
- Saulaepoma Watters, 2006
- Weinlandipoma Bartsch, 1946
- Xenopoma Crosse, 1891
- Xenopomoides de la Torre & Bartsch, 1941

Subfamily Chondropomatinae Henderson & Bartsch, 1920

- Aguayotudora de la Torre & Bartsch, 1941
- Annularodes Henderson & Bartsch, 1920
- Bonairea H. B. Baker, 1924
- Chondropoma L. Pfeiffer, 1847
- Chondrops Bartsch, 1946
- Chondrothyrium Henderson & Bartsch, 1920
- Colonella Bartsch, 1946
- Crossepoma Bartsch, 1946
- Cubadamsiella de la Torre & Bartsch, 1941
- Diplopoma L. Pfeiffer, 1859
- Parachondria Dall, 1905
- Parachondrops Henderson & Bartsch, 1920
- Rhytidopoma Sykes, 1901
- Rhytidothyra Henderson & Bartsch, 1920

Subfamily Rhytidopomatinae Henderson & Bartsch, 1920

- Colonina Bartsch, 1946
- Ramsdenia Preston, 1913

Subfamily Tudorinae Watters, 2006

- Annularita Henderson & Bartsch, 1920
- Articulipoma Bartsch, 1946
- Choanopomops H. B. Baker, 1928
- Chondropomartes Henderson & Bartsch, 1920
- Chondropomella Bartsch, 1932
- Chondropometes Henderson & Bartsch, 1920
- Chondropomium Henderson & Bartsch, 1920
- Chondrothyra Henderson & Bartsch, 1920
- Clydonopoma Pilsbry, 1933
- Colobostylus Crosse & P. Fischer, 1888
- Dallsiphona de la Torre & Bartsch, 1941
- Eutudora Henderson & Bartsch, 1920
- Gouldipoma Watters, 2006
- Gutierrezium de la Torre & Bartsch, 1938
- Halotudora Watters, 2006
- Licina Gray, 1847
- Paradoxipoma Watters, 2014
- Sallepoma Bartsch, 1946
- Samanicola Watters, 2006
- Superbipoma Watters & Larson, 2017
- Tudora Gray, 1850
- Tudorina de la Torre & Bartsch, 1941
- Tudorisca Henderson & Bartsch, 1920
- Turrithyra de la Torre & Bartsch, 1938
- Tessaripoma Watters, 2016
- Incertipoma Bartsch, 1946 (temporary name)

== Distribution ==
Island of Hispaniola and the Bahama Archipelago.
