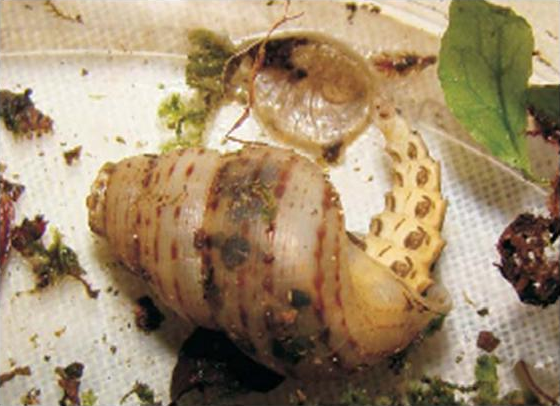
- firefly larva Alecton discoidalis is feeding on Chondropoma pictum

Scientific classification
- Kingdom: Animalia
- Phylum: Mollusca
- Class: Gastropoda
- Subclass: Caenogastropoda
- Order: Littorinimorpha
- Superfamily: Littorinoidea
- Family: Annulariidae
- Genus: Chondropoma; L. Pfeiffer, 1847

Type species
- Cyclostoma sagra d'Orbigny, 1842

Diversity
- at least 64 species (in this list)

Synonyms
- Chondropoma (Chondropoma) L. Pfeiffer, 1847· accepted, alternate representation; Chondropoma (Chondrops) Bartsch, 1946· accepted, alternate representation; Chondropoma (Wetmorepoma) Bartsch, 1946· accepted, alternate representation; Chondropomisca de la Torre & Bartsch, 1938; Chondropomodes de la Torre & Bartsch, 1938; Cyclostoma (Chondropoma) L. Pfeiffer, 1847; Levipoma Bartsch, 1946

= Chondropoma =

Genus of gastropods

Chondropoma is a genus of small operculate land snails, terrestrial gastropods in the subfamily Chondropomatinae of the family Annulariidae.

== Distribution ==
Distribution of Chondropoma include Cuba, Nicaragua, the Dominican Republic ...

63 species of Chondropoma lives in Cuba.

== Species ==
Species within the genus Chondropoma include:

- Chondropoma abnatum (Gundlach in Pfeiffer, 1858)
- Chondropoma abtianum (Pfeiffer, 1862)
- Chondropoma aguayoi Torre & Bartsch, 1938
- Chondropoma alayoi Aguayo & Jaume, 1957
- Chondropoma alberti Clench & Aguayo, 1948
- Chondropoma alcaldei Jaume & Sánchez de Fuentes, 1943
- Chondropoma antonense Torre & Bartsch, 1938
- Chondropoma aspratile (Morelet, 1873)
- Chondropoma asperulum Aguayo, 1934
- Chondropoma auberianum (d'Orbigny, 1842)
- Chondropoma bairense Torre & Bartsch, 1938
- Chondropoma cabrerai Torre & Bartsch, 1938
- Chondropoma callipeplum Solem, 1961
- Chondropoma carenasense Pilsbry & Henderson, 1912
- Chondropoma cleti Aguayo, 1939
- Chondropoma cognatum Torre & Bartsch, 1938
- Chondropoma confertum (Poey, 1852)
- Chondropoma chordatum (Gundlach in Pfeiffer, 1858)
- Chondropoma daudinoti (Gundlach in Pfeiffer, 1860)
- Chondropoma delatreanum (d'Orbigny, 1842)
- Chondropoma dilatatum (Gundlach in Pfeiffer, 1859)
- Chondropoma eduardoi Aguayo, 1934
- Chondropoma erectum (Gundlach in Pfeiffer, 1858)
- Chondropoma ernesti Pfeiffer, 1862
- Chondropoma fuentesi Jaume & Alcalde, 1944
- Chondropoma garcianum Torre, 1913
- Chondropoma greenfieldi Torre & Bartsch, 1938
- Chondropoma guisaense Torre & Bartsch, 1938
- Chondropoma gutierrezi (Gundlach in Pfeiffer, 1856)
- Chondropoma holguinense (Aguayo, 1944)
- Chondropoma irradians (Robert J. Shuttleworth in Pfeiffer, 1852)
- Chondropoma jaulense Torre & Bartsch, 1938
- Chondropoma laetum (Gutierrez in Poey, 1858)
- Chondropoma lembeyi Torre & Bartsch, 1938
- Chondropoma leoni Torre & Bartsch, 1938
- Chondropoma marginalbum (Gundlach in Pfeiffer, 1859)
- Chondropoma moestum (Robert J. Shuttleworth in Pfeiffer, 1854)
- Chondropoma montanum Torre & Bartsch, 1938
- Chondropoma neglectum (Gundlach in Pfeiffer, 1856)
- Chondropoma nicolasi Torre & Bartsch, 1938
- Chondropoma nigriculum (Gundlach, 1860)
- Chondropoma obesum (Menke, 1830)
- Chondropoma oxytremum (Gundlach in Pfeiffer, 1860)
- Chondropoma perlatum (Gundlach in Poey, 1858)
- Chondropoma pfeifferi Aguayo, 1945
- Chondropoma pfeifferianum (Poey, 1851)
- Chondropoma pictum (Pfeiffer, 1839)
- Chondropoma poeyanum (d'Orbigny, 1842)
- Chondropoma portuandoi Torre & Bartsch, 1938
- Chondropoma presasianum (Gundlach, 1863)
- Chondropoma revinctum (Poey, 1851)
- Chondropoma revocatum (Gundlach in Pfeiffer, 1857)
- Chondropoma rolandoi Aguayo, 1943
- Chondropoma rufilabre (Potiez & Michaud, 1838)
- Chondropoma rufopictum (Gundlach in Pfeiffer, 1860)
- Chondropoma solidulum (Gundlach in Pfeiffer, 1860)
- Chondropoma tejedori Clench & Aguayo, 1946
- Chondropoma tenuisculptum Aguayo, 1939
- Chondropoma textum (Gundlach in Pfeiffer, 1858)
- Chondropoma unilabiatum (Gundlach in Pfeiffer, 1860)
- Chondropoma vespertinum (Morelet, 1851)
- Chondropoma virgineum Aguayo, 1953
- Chondropoma wilcoxi Pilsbry & Henderson, 1912
- Chondropoma wrighti (Pfeiffer, 1862)
- Chondropoma yucayum (Presas in Pfeiffer, 1863)
- Chondropoma zorrillae Jaume, 1984
