= Chondropometes =

Scientific classification
- Kingdom: Animalia
- Phylum: Mollusca
- Class: Gastropoda
- Subclass: Caenogastropoda
- Order: Littorinimorpha
- Superfamily: Littorinoidea
- Family: Pomatiidae
- Genus: Chondropometes; Henderson & Bartsch, 1920

Synonyms
- Chondrothyroma Henderson & Bartsch, 1920

Genus of gastropods

Chondropometes is a genus of land snails with an operculum, terrestrial gastropod mollusks in the family Annulariidae.

== Species ==
Species within the genus Chondropometes include:

- Chondropometes bellisimum Torre & Bartsch, 1938
- Chondropometes concolor Torre & Bartsch, 1938
- Chondropometes eximium Torre & Bartsch, 1938
- Chondropometes exquisitum Torre & Bartsch, 1938
- Chondropometes latilabre (d’Orbigny, 1842)
- Chondropometes magnum Torre & Bartsch, 1938
- Chondropometes saccharinum Torre & Bartsch, 1938
- Chondropometes sagebieni (Poey, 1858)
- Chondropometes scopulorum Torre & Bartsch, 1938
- Chondropometes segregatum Torre & Bartsch, 1938
- Chondropometes torrei Bartsch, 1937
- Chondropometes vignalense (Wright in Pfeiffer, 1863)
