= Annularops =

Scientific classification
- Kingdom: Animalia
- Phylum: Mollusca
- Class: Gastropoda
- Subclass: Caenogastropoda
- Order: Littorinimorpha
- Superfamily: Littorinoidea
- Family: Pomatiidae
- Genus: Annularops; Henderson & Bartsch, 1920

Genus of gastropods

Annularops blaini (Pfeiffer, 1863)

Annularops is a genus of land snails with an operculum, terrestrial gastropod mollusks in the family Pomatiidae.

== Species ==
Species within the genus Annularops include:

- Annularops attenuata (Torre & Bartsch, 1941)
- Annularops blaini (Gundlach in Pfeiffer, 1863)
- Annularops coronadoi (Arango in Poey, 1867)
- Annularops perplexa (Torre & Bartsch, 1941)
- Annularops sauvallei (Gundlach in Bartsch, 1863)
- Annularops semicana (Morelet, 1851)
- Annularops tryoni (Arango, 1879)
- Annularops vannostrandi (Arango, 1876)
