= Dallsiphona =

Scientific classification
- Kingdom: Animalia
- Phylum: Mollusca
- Class: Gastropoda
- Subclass: Caenogastropoda
- Order: Littorinimorpha
- Superfamily: Littorinoidea
- Family: Pomatiidae
- Genus: Dallsiphona; Torre & Bartsch, 1941

Genus of gastropods

Dallsiphona is a genus of land snails with an operculum, terrestrial gastropod mollusks in the family Pomatiidae.

== Species ==
Species within the genus Dallsiphona include:

- Dallsiphona dalli (Torre & Henderson, 1920)
