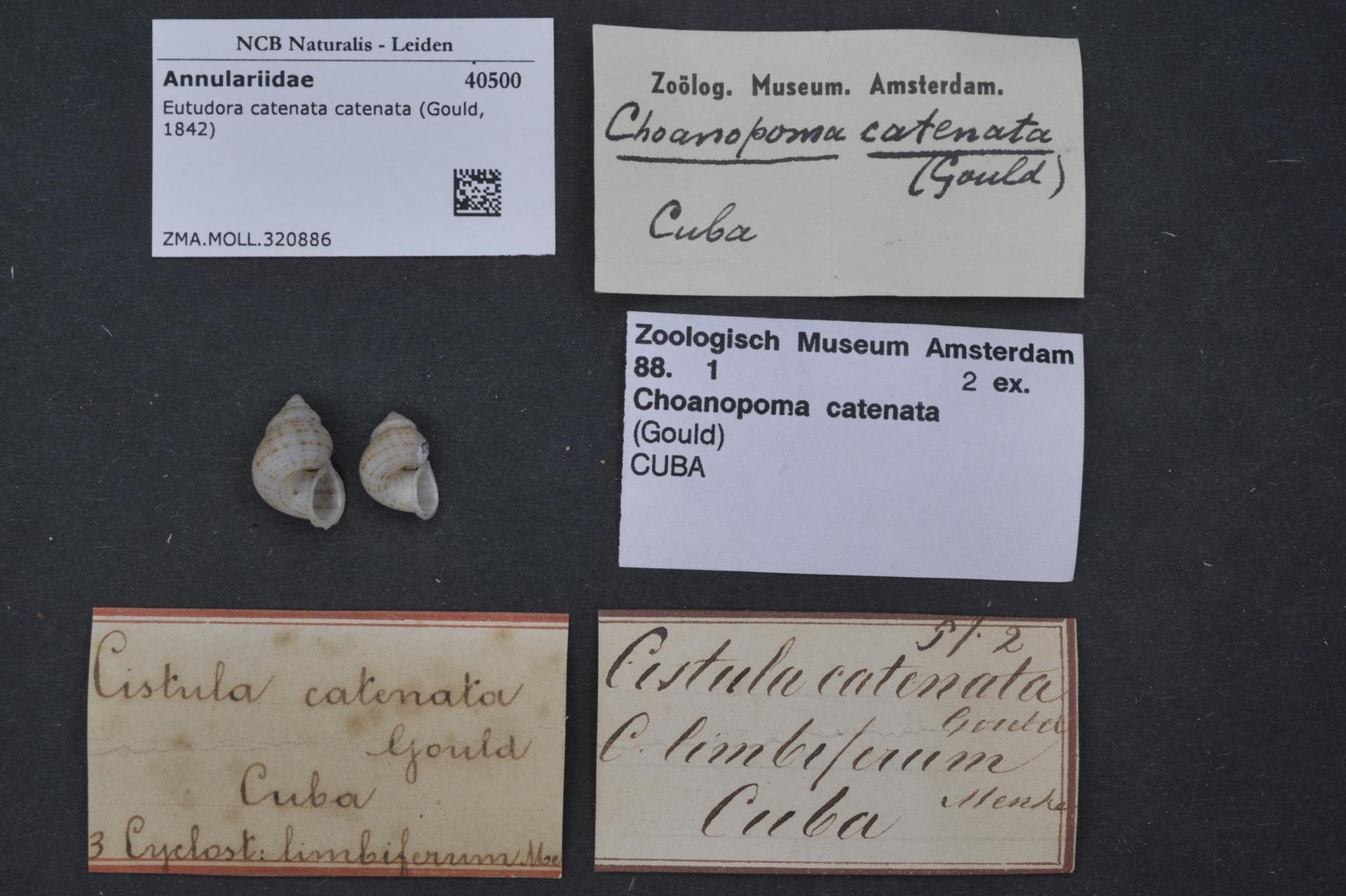
- Shells of eutudora catenata catenata (subspecies)

Scientific classification
- Kingdom: Animalia
- Phylum: Mollusca
- Class: Gastropoda
- Subclass: Caenogastropoda
- Order: Littorinimorpha
- Superfamily: Littorinoidea
- Family: Pomatiidae
- Genus: Eutudora; Henderson & Bartsch, 1920

= Eutudora =

Genus of gastropods

Eutudora is a genus of land snails with an operculum, terrestrial gastropod mollusks in the family Pomatiidae.

== Species ==
Species within the genus Eutudora include:

- Eutudora agassizi (Charpentier in Pfeiffer, 1852)
- Eutudora cabrerai (Torre & Bartsch, 1941)
- Eutudora camoensis (Torre & Bartsch, 1941)
- Eutudora catenata (Gould, 1843)
- Eutudora jimenoi (Arango in Pfeiffer, 1864)
- Eutudora limbifera (Menke in Pfeiffer, 1846)
- Eutudora transitoria (Torre & Bartsch, 1941)
