= Maladera sincera =

Scientific classification
- Kingdom: Animalia
- Phylum: Arthropoda
- Class: Insecta
- Order: Coleoptera
- Suborder: Polyphaga
- Infraorder: Scarabaeiformia
- Family: Scarabaeidae
- Genus: Maladera
- Species: M. sincera

Binomial name
- Maladera sincera (Brenske, 1899)

Synonyms
- Autoserica sincera Brenske, 1899

Species of beetle

Maladera sincera is a species of beetle of the family Scarabaeidae. It is found in Indonesia (Sumatra).

== Description ==
Adults reach a length of about 10 mm. They are dark brown and dull. The pronotum is very finely pubescent. The elytra are punctate in rows, the intervals widely punctate, finely pubescent. The pygidium is pointed.

== Taxonomy ==
In his work Die Serica-Arten der Erde, Brenske described two species under the name Autoserica sincera. One from Malaysia and one from Sumatra. The former was given the replacement name Autoserica zeta by Karl Wilhelm von Dalla Torre in 1912.
