= Annularodes =

Scientific classification
- Kingdom: Animalia
- Phylum: Mollusca
- Class: Gastropoda
- Subclass: Caenogastropoda
- Order: Littorinimorpha
- Superfamily: Littorinoidea
- Family: Pomatiidae
- Genus: Annularodes; Henderson & Bartsch, 1920

Genus of gastropods

Annularodes is a genus of land snails with an operculum, terrestrial gastropod mollusks in the family Pomatiidae.

== Species ==
Species within the genus Annularodes include:

- Annularodes boqueronensis (Torre & Bartsch, 1941)
- Annularodes canoaensis (Torre & Bartsch, 1941)
- Annularodes cantarillensis (Torre & Bartsch, 1941)
- Annularodes indivisa (Welch, 1929)
- Annularodes inquisita (Pfeiffer, 1929)
- Annularodes morenoi (Torre & Bartsch, 1941)
- Annularodes obsoleta (Torre & Bartsch, 1941)
- Annularodes perezi (Torre & Bartsch, 1941)
- Annularodes pilsbryi (Welch, 1929)
- Annularodes terneroensis (Torre & Bartsch, 1941)
- Annularodes unicinata (Arango, 1884)
