= Annularisca =

Scientific classification
- Kingdom: Animalia
- Phylum: Mollusca
- Class: Gastropoda
- Subclass: Caenogastropoda
- Order: Littorinimorpha
- Superfamily: Littorinoidea
- Family: Pomatiidae
- Genus: Annularisca; Henderson & Bartsch, 1920

Genus of gastropods

Annularisca is a genus of land snails with an operculum, terrestrial gastropod mollusks in the family Pomatiidae.

== Species ==
Species within the genus Annularisca include:

- Annularisca aberrans Torre & Bartsch, 1941
- Annularisca alata (Pfeiffer, 1851)
- Annularisca alayoi (Jaume, 1984)
- Annularisca armasi (Jaume, 1984)
- Annularisca arquesi Torre & Bartsch, 1941
- Annularisca auricoma (Gundlach in Pfeiffer, 1859)
- Annularisca borroi (Jaume, 1984)
- Annularisca cumulata (Pfeiffer, 1863)
- Annularisca eburnea (Gundlach in Pfeiffer, 1858)
- Annularisca fragilis (Gundlach in Pfeiffer, 1859)
- Annularisca hendersoni Torre & Bartsch, 1941
- Annularisca heynemanni (Pfeiffer, 1864)
- Annularisca holguinensis Torre & Bartsch, 1941
- Annularisca incerta Torre & Bartsch, 1941
- Annularisca intercisa Torre & Bartsch, 1941
- Annularisca interstitialis (Gundlach in Pfeiffer, 1859)
- Annularisca mackinlayi (Gundlach in Pfeiffer, 1859)
- Annularisca mayariensis Torre & Bartsch, 1941
- Annularisca mayensis Torre & Bartsch, 1941
- Annularisca pallens Torre & Bartsch, 1941
- Annularisca prestoni (Ramsden, 1914)
- Annularisca pseudalata (Torre in Pilsbry & Henderson, 1912)
- Annularisca ramsdeni (Pilsbry & Henderson, 1912)
- Annularisca romeri (Pfeiffer, 1864)
- Annularisca tacrensis Torre & Bartsch, 1941
- Annularisca toroensis Torre & Bartsch, 1941
- Annularisca torrebartschi (Jaume, 1984)
- Annularisca victoris Torre & Bartsch, 1941
- Annularisca wrighti Torre & Bartsch, 1941
- Annularisca yaterasensis (Pfeiffer, 1865)
- Annularisca yumuriensis Torre & Bartsch, 1941
- Annularisca yunquensis (Pfeiffer, 1860)
