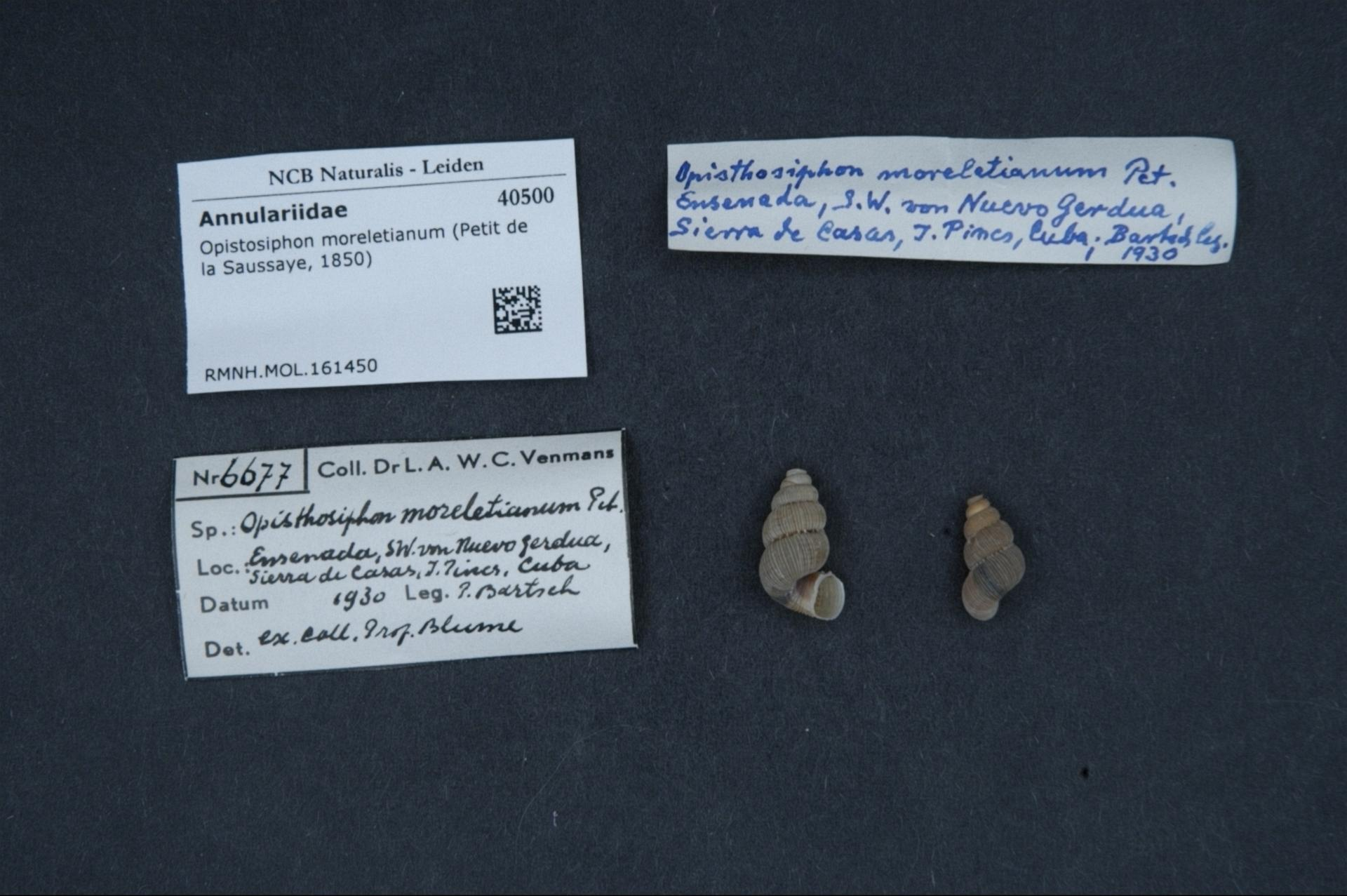
- Opisthosiphon moreletianum (Petit de la Saussaye, 1850)

Scientific classification
- Domain: Eukaryota
- Kingdom: Animalia
- Phylum: Mollusca
- Class: Gastropoda
- Subclass: Caenogastropoda
- Order: Littorinimorpha
- Family: Annulariidae
- Subfamily: Abbottellinae
- Genus: Opisthosiphon; W. H. Dall, 1905

Synonyms
- List: Bermudezsiphona de la Torre & Bartsch, 1941; Cubitasiphona de la Torre & Bartsch, 1941; Cylindrosiphona de la Torre & Bartsch, 1941; Leptopisthosiphon Bartsch, 1946; Mirisiphon de la Torre & Bartsch, 1941; Opisthocoelex de la Torre & Bartsch, 1941; Opisthocoelicum de la Torre & Bartsch, 1941; Opisthocoelops de la Torre & Bartsch, 1941; Opisthosiphon (Opisthosiphon) W. H. Dall, 1905; Opisthosiphon (Opisthosiphona) Henderson & Bartsch, 1920

= Opisthosiphon =

Genus of gastropods

Opisthosiphon is a genus of land snails with an operculum, terrestrial gastropod mollusks in the family Annulariidae.

== Description ==
The genus Opisthosiphon has been described by American malacologist William Healey Dall in 1905. Dall's type description reads as follows:

Genus nov. OPISTHOSIPHON, Dall.

Type: Chondropoma Bahamense, Sh. (Figs. 1, 2.) Bahamas.

Shell with the habit of Chondropoma dentatum, Say, but in the adult with a tubular projection behind and distinct from the outer lip and the posterior angle of the aperture, but communicating with the

lumen of the whorl. operculum as in Rhytidopoma, but thinner.

== Species ==
The following species are recognised in the genus Opisthosiphon:

- Opisthosiphon acklinsensis Bartsch, 1946
- Opisthosiphon aguilerianum (Arango, 1876)
- Opisthosiphon alleni Bartsch, 1946
- Opisthosiphon andrewsi Welch, 1929
- Opisthosiphon androsensis Pilsbry, 1930
- Opisthosiphon apertum de la Torre & Henderson, 1921
- Opisthosiphon bacillum de la Torre & Bartsch, 1941
- Opisthosiphon bahamense (L. Pfeiffer, 1865)
- Opisthosiphon banaoense de la Torre & J. B. Henderson, 1921
- Opisthosiphon bermudezi de la Torre & Bartsch, 1941
- Opisthosiphon berryi W. F. Clapp, 1919
- Opisthosiphon bioscai de la Torre & Henderson, 1921
- Opisthosiphon caguanense de la Torre & Bartsch, 1941
- Opisthosiphon caroli Aguayo, 1932
- Opisthosiphon claudens de la Torre & Bartsch, 1941
- Opisthosiphon conicus Aguayo & Sánchez Roig, 1949
- Opisthosiphon cucullatum de la Torre & Bartsch, 1941
- Opisthosiphon cunaguae Welch, 1929
- Opisthosiphon detectum de la Torre & Henderson, 1921
- Opisthosiphon deviatum de la Torre & Bartsch, 1941
- Opisthosiphon echinatum (L. Pfeiffer, 1857)
- Opisthosiphon evanidum de la Torre & Henderson, 1921
- Opisthosiphon excurrens (L. Pfeiffer & Gundlach, 1860)
- Opisthosiphon greenfieldi de la Torre & Bartsch, 1941
- Opisthosiphon guanajaense de la Torre & Bartsch, 1941
- Opisthosiphon insulanum de la Torre & Bartsch, 1941
- Opisthosiphon judasense de la Torre & Henderson, 1921
- Opisthosiphon lamellicostatum de la Torre & Henderson, 1921
- Opisthosiphon lamellosum de la Torre & Bartsch, 1941
- Opisthosiphon litorale de la Torre & Bartsch, 1941
- Opisthosiphon lucayanorus Clench, 1963
- Opisthosiphon manatiense de la Torre & Bartsch, 1941
- Opisthosiphon maynardi Vanatta, 1920
- Opisthosiphon mayori Bartsch, 1946
- Opisthosiphon millsi Bartsch, 1946
- Opisthosiphon moreletianum (Petit de la Saussaye, 1850)
- Opisthosiphon nicholasi Bartsch, 1946
- Opisthosiphon obtectum de la Torre & Henderson, 1921
- Opisthosiphon obturatum de la Torre & J. B. Henderson, 1921
- Opisthosiphon opisthocoele (de la Torre & Bartsch, 1941)
- Opisthosiphon palmeri de la Torre & Bartsch, 1941
- Opisthosiphon paradoxum (de la Torre & J. B. Henderson, 1921)
- Opisthosiphon paredonense de la Torre & Henderson, 1921
- Opisthosiphon plateroense de la Torre & Bartsch, 1941
- Opisthosiphon plicatum de la Torre & Bartsch, 1941
- Opisthosiphon poeyi de la Torre & Bartsch, 1941
- Opisthosiphon prominulum de la Torre & Bartsch, 1941
- Opisthosiphon protractum de la Torre & Henderson, 1921
- Opisthosiphon pupoides (Morelet, 1849)
- Opisthosiphon quesadai Aguayo, 1932
- Opisthosiphon quinti de la Torre & Bartsch, 1941
- Opisthosiphon sainzi Aguayo, 1934
- Opisthosiphon salustii de la Torre & Henderson, 1921
- Opisthosiphon sanchezi de la Torre & Bartsch, 1941
- Opisthosiphon sculptum (L. Pfeiffer, 1857)
- Opisthosiphon simpsoni Bartsch, 1946
- Opisthosiphon simulans (de la Torre & Bartsch, 1941)
- Opisthosiphon sosai de la Torre & Bartsch, 1941
- Opisthosiphon subobtectum de la Torre & Bartsch, 1941
- Opisthosiphon subobturatum de la Torre & J. B. Henderson, 1921
- Opisthosiphon tersum de la Torre & Henderson, 1921
- Opisthosiphon thesaurus Watters, 2019
- Opisthosiphon torrei Welch, 1929
- Opisthosiphon turiguanoense de la Torre & Bartsch, 1941
