= Cubadamsiella =

Scientific classification
- Kingdom: Animalia
- Phylum: Mollusca
- Class: Gastropoda
- Subclass: Caenogastropoda
- Order: Littorinimorpha
- Superfamily: Littorinoidea
- Family: Pomatiidae
- Genus: Cubadamsiella; Torre & Bartsch, 1941

Genus of gastropods

Cubadamsiella is a genus of land snails with an operculum, terrestrial gastropod mollusks in the family Pomatiidae.

== Species ==
Species within the genus Cubadamsiella include:

- Cubadamsiella beneitoi Fernández-Garcés, Espinosa & Ortea, 2003
- Cubadamsiella gratiosa (Torre & Bartsch, 1941)
- Cubadamsiella lamellata (Alcalde, 1945)
- Cubadamsiella lamellata Alcalde, 1945
- Cubadamsiella leoni (Torre & Bartsch, 1941)
- Cubadamsiella procax (Poey, 1851)
