= Maladera laticrus =

Scientific classification
- Kingdom: Animalia
- Phylum: Arthropoda
- Clade: Pancrustacea
- Class: Insecta
- Order: Coleoptera
- Suborder: Polyphaga
- Infraorder: Scarabaeiformia
- Family: Scarabaeidae
- Genus: Maladera
- Species: M. laticrus

Binomial name
- Maladera laticrus (Moser, 1915)

Synonyms
- Autoserica laticrus Moser, 1915

Species of beetle

Maladera laticrus is a species of beetle of the family Scarabaeidae. It is found in Thailand.

== Description ==
Adults reach a length of about 9 mm (0.35 in). They are similar to Maladera solida, but in this species, the middle of the thorax is densely setate. The colouration is brown and dull. Due to the dense tomentum covering, punctures are barely visible on the frons. A few setae are present behind the clypeus suture, as well as on the clypeus itself. The clypeus is widely and shallowly punctate, with an indistinct longitudinal keel. The anterior margin is raised and weakly recurved in the middle. The antennae are yellowish-brown. Due to the dense tomentum covering, punctures are also barely visible on the pronotum. The lateral margins are slightly curved and setate and the anterior angles are projected, and the posterior angles are obtuse and rounded. The elytra are punctate in the stripes, the interstices are weakly convex and almost unpunctate. The pygidium bears moderately dense punctation and is covered with erect setae in front of the posterior margin. The thorax shows a broken longitudinal line in the middle and scattered setae next to it.
