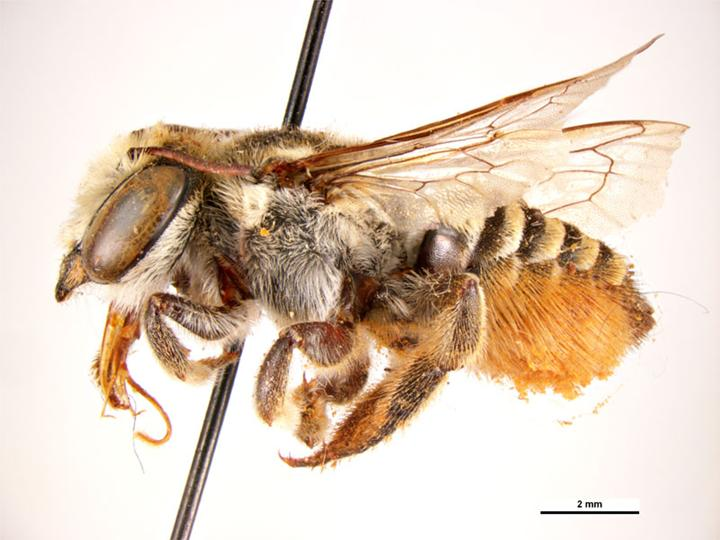

Scientific classification
- Kingdom: Animalia
- Phylum: Arthropoda
- Class: Insecta
- Order: Hymenoptera
- Family: Megachilidae
- Genus: Megachile
- Species: M. macularis

Binomial name
- Megachile macularis Dalla Torre, 1896

= Megachile macularis =

Species of leafcutter bee (Megachile)

Megachile macularis is a species of bee in the family Megachilidae. It was described by Karl Wilhelm von Dalla Torre in 1896.
