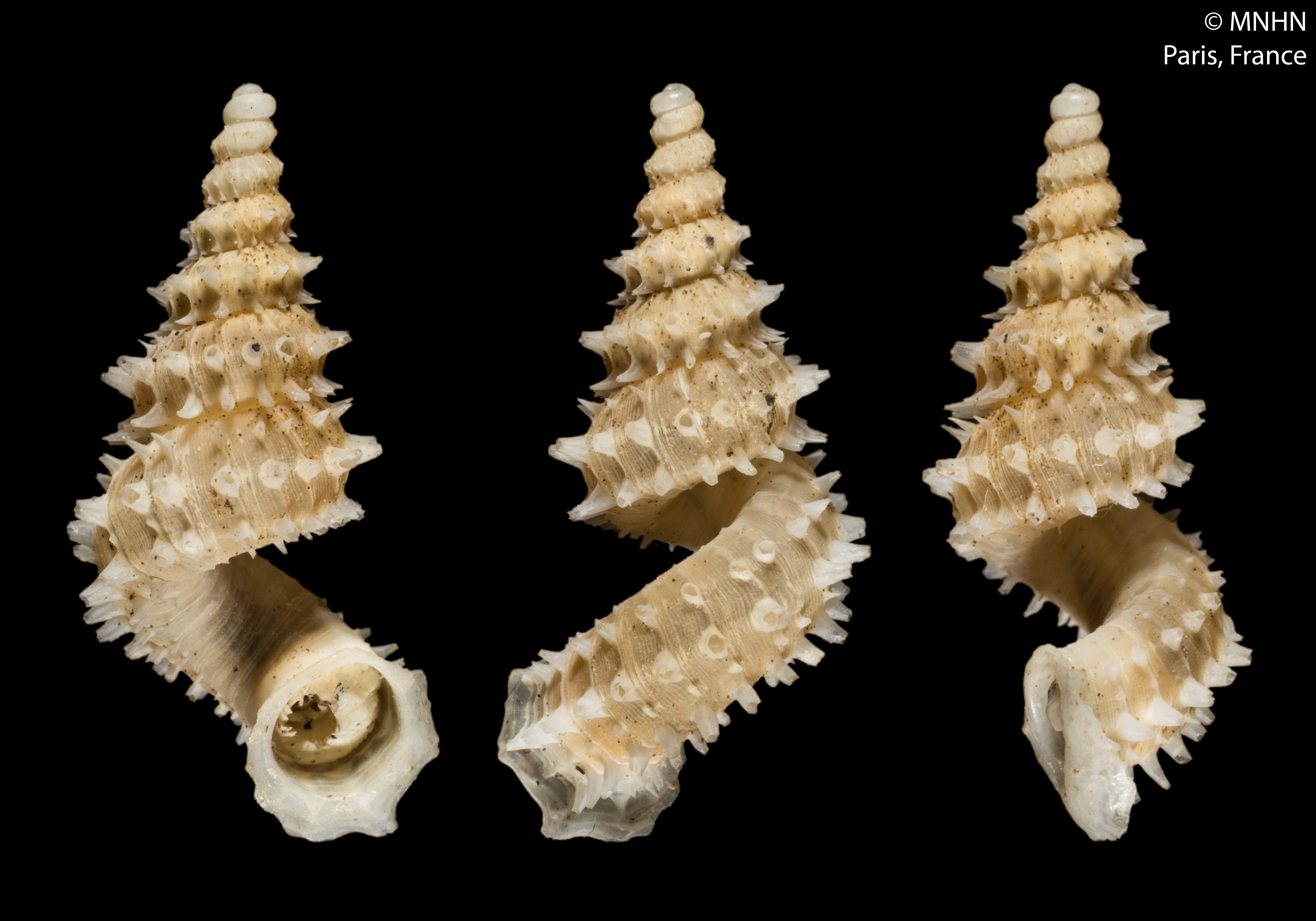
- Shell of Xenopoma hystrix (syntype at MNHN, Paris)

Scientific classification
- Kingdom: Animalia
- Phylum: Mollusca
- Class: Gastropoda
- Subclass: Caenogastropoda
- Order: Littorinimorpha
- Family: Annulariidae
- Genus: Xenopoma; Crosse, 1890

= Xenopoma =

Genus of gastropods

Xenopoma is a genus of land snails with an operculum, terrestrial gastropod mollusks in the family Annulariidae.

== Species ==
Species within the genus Xenopoma include:

- Xenopoma aguayoi Torre & Bartsch, 1941
- Xenopoma hendersoni Torre & Bartsch, 1941
- Xenopoma humboldtianum (Pfeiffer, 1867)
- Xenopoma hystrix (Wright in Pfeiffer, 1862) - type species
- Xenopoma spinosissimum Torre & Bartsch, 1941
