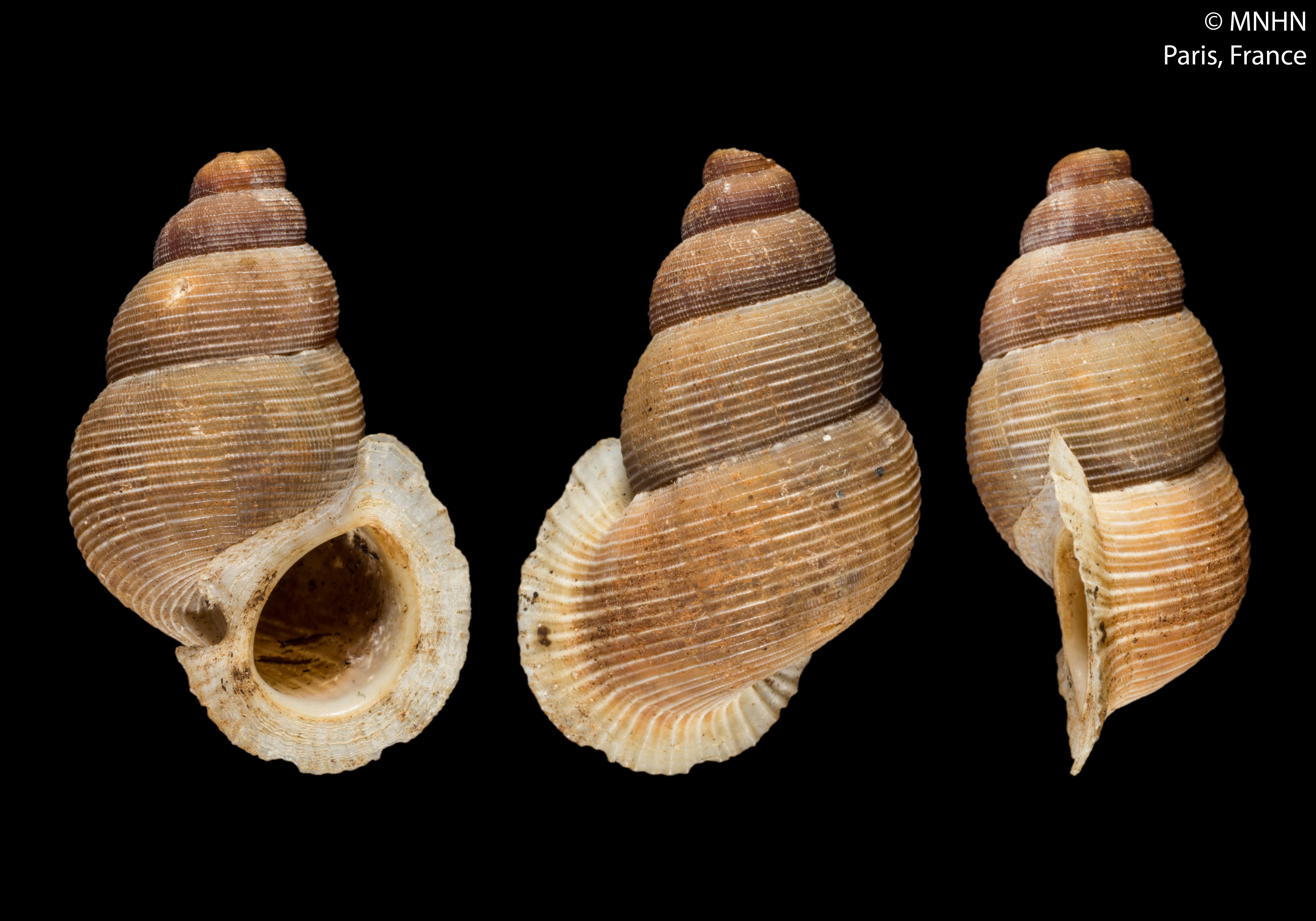
- Shell of Chondrothyra gundlachi (syntype at MNHN, Paris)

Scientific classification
- Kingdom: Animalia
- Phylum: Mollusca
- Class: Gastropoda
- Subclass: Caenogastropoda
- Order: Littorinimorpha
- Superfamily: Littorinoidea
- Family: Pomatiidae
- Genus: Chondrothyra; Henderson & Bartsch, 1920

= Chondrothyra =

Genus of gastropods

Chondrothyra is a genus of land snails with an operculum, terrestrial gastropod mollusks in the family Pomatiidae.

== Species ==
The following species are recognised in the genus Chondrothyra:

- Chondrothyra affinis (C. de la Torre & Bartsch, 1938)
- Chondrothyra assimilis (L. Pfeiffer, 1863)
- Chondrothyra atristoma C. de la Torre & Bartsch, 1938
- Chondrothyra barbouri (C. de la Torre & Bartsch, 1938)
- Chondrothyra cerina (C. de la Torre & Bartsch, 1938)
- Chondrothyra claudicans (Poey, 1851)
- Chondrothyra crassa C. de la Torre & Bartsch, 1938
- Chondrothyra cumbrensis C. de la Torre & Bartsch, 1938
- Chondrothyra cuzcoensis (C. de la Torre & Bartsch, 1938)
- Chondrothyra delectabilis (C. de la Torre & Bartsch, 1938)
- Chondrothyra egregia (Gundlach, 1856)
- Chondrothyra excisa (L. Pfeiffer, 1863)
- Chondrothyra foveata (L. Pfeiffer, 1863)
- Chondrothyra gundlachi (Arango, 1862)
- Chondrothyra impressa (C. de la Torre & Bartsch, 1938)
- Chondrothyra incrassata (L. Pfeiffer, 1863)
- Chondrothyra natensoni C. de la Torre & Bartsch, 1938
- Chondrothyra ottonis (L. Pfeiffer, 1846)
- Chondrothyra paredonis (Sánchez Roig, 1951)
- Chondrothyra parilis (C. de la Torre & Bartsch, 1938)
- Chondrothyra percrassa (L. Pfeiffer, 1864)
- Chondrothyra perturbata (C. de la Torre & Bartsch, 1938)
- Chondrothyra petricosa (Morelet, 1851)
- Chondrothyra pudica (A. d'Orbigny, 1842)
- Chondrothyra reticulata (C. de la Torre & Bartsch, 1938)
- Chondrothyra rutila C. de la Torre & Bartsch, 1938
- Chondrothyra shuttleworthi (L. Pfeiffer, 1853)
- Chondrothyra subegregia C. de la Torre & Bartsch, 1938
- Chondrothyra tenebrata (C. de la Torre & Bartsch, 1938)
- Chondrothyra tenebrosa (Morelet, 1849)
- Chondrothyra tosta C. de la Torre & Bartsch, 1938
- Chondrothyra uniplicata C. de la Torre & Bartsch, 1938
- Chondrothyra wrighti C. de la Torre & Bartsch, 1938
