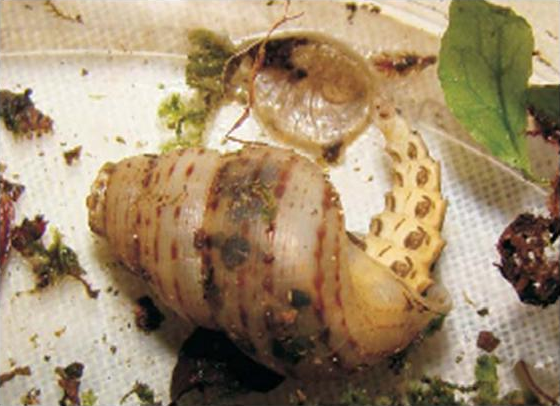
- firefly larva Alecton discoidalis is feeding on Chondropoma pictum with the operculum out, in captivity

Scientific classification
- Kingdom: Animalia
- Phylum: Mollusca
- Class: Gastropoda
- Subclass: Caenogastropoda
- Order: Littorinimorpha
- Family: Annulariidae
- Genus: Chondropoma
- Species: C. pictum

Binomial name
- Chondropoma pictum (Pfeiffer, 1839)

= Chondropoma pictum =

Species of gastropod

Chondropoma pictum is a species of an operculate land snail, terrestrial gastropod mollusk in the family Pomatiidae.

== Distribution ==
This species lives in Cuba, for example at Bacunayagua.

== Ecology ==
Chondropoma pictum is a ground dwelling, rock dwelling and tree dwelling species.

It has been observed behavior in the field, that Chondropoma pictum disturbed by humans has swung the shell forward as a defense mechanism avoiding attack by predators.

Predators of Chondropoma pictum include larvae of firefly bug Alecton discoidalis. On some occasions, the Chondropoma pictum emitted a protective foam which enabled them to thwart the attack.
