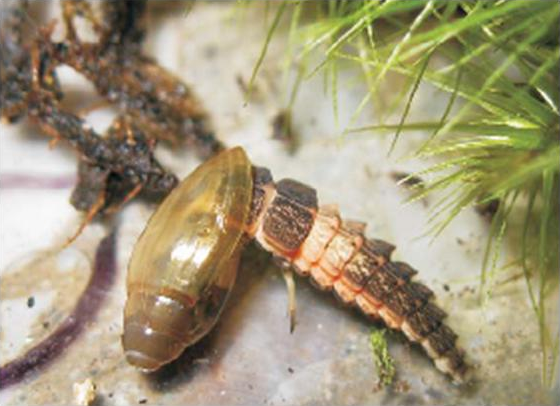
- A larva of Alecton discoidalis preying on a pulmonate land snail in the genus Oleacina

Scientific classification
- Kingdom: Animalia
- Phylum: Arthropoda
- Clade: Pancrustacea
- Class: Insecta
- Order: Coleoptera
- Suborder: Polyphaga
- Infraorder: Elateriformia
- Family: Lampyridae
- Subfamily: Lampyrinae
- Tribe: Lamprocerini
- Genus: Alecton; Laporte, 1833

= Alecton =

Genus of beetle

Alecton is a genus of firefly in the beetle family Lampyridae. The species Alecton discoidalis is the best known of the four species in the genus. Alecton is believed to be endemic to Cuba.
