= Chondropoma irradians =

Scientific classification
- Kingdom: Animalia
- Phylum: Mollusca
- Class: Gastropoda
- Subclass: Caenogastropoda
- Order: Littorinimorpha
- Family: Annulariidae
- Genus: Chondropoma
- Species: C. irradians

Binomial name
- Chondropoma irradians (Shuttleworth in Pfeiffer, 1852)

Species of gastropod

Chondropoma irradians is a species of an operculate land snail, terrestrial gastropod mollusk in the family Pomatiidae.

== Distribution ==
This species lives in Cuba.

== Ecology ==
Chondropoma irradians is a ground dwelling and rock dwelling species.

Predators of Chondropoma irradians include larvae of firefly bug Alecton discoidalis.
