= Euurobracon yokahamae =

Scientific classification
- Kingdom: Animalia
- Phylum: Arthropoda
- Clade: Pancrustacea
- Class: Insecta
- Order: Hymenoptera
- Family: Braconidae
- Genus: Euurobracon
- Species: E. yokahamae

Binomial name
- Euurobracon yokahamae (Dalla Torre, 1898)

Synonyms
- Bracon yokahamae Dalla Torre, 1898

Species of insect

Euurobracon yokahamae is a species of wasp in the family Braconidae. It was described by Karl Wilhelm von Dalla Torre in 1898.

== Distribution ==
This species is distributed in Eastern Asia (Japan, Korea, China), Laos, Thailand, and India.
