= Chondropoma auberianum =

Scientific classification
- Kingdom: Animalia
- Phylum: Mollusca
- Class: Gastropoda
- Subclass: Caenogastropoda
- Order: Littorinimorpha
- Family: Annulariidae
- Genus: Chondropoma
- Species: C. auberianum

Binomial name
- Chondropoma auberianum (d’Orbigny, 1842)

Species of gastropod

Chondropoma auberianum is a species of an operculate land snail, terrestrial gastropod mollusk in the family Pomatiidae.

== Distribution ==
This species lives in Cuba.

== Ecology ==
Chondropoma auberianum is a tree dwelling species.

Predators of Chondropoma auberianum include larvae of firefly bug Alecton discoidalis.
