= Maladera zeta =

Scientific classification
- Kingdom: Animalia
- Phylum: Arthropoda
- Class: Insecta
- Order: Coleoptera
- Suborder: Polyphaga
- Infraorder: Scarabaeiformia
- Family: Scarabaeidae
- Genus: Maladera
- Species: M. zeta

Binomial name
- Maladera zeta (Dalla Torre, 1912)

Synonyms
- Autoserica zeta Dalla Torre, 1912; Autoserica sincera Brenske, 1899

Species of beetle

Maladera zeta is a species of beetle of the family Scarabaeidae. It is found in Malaysia.

== Description ==
Adults reach a length of about 10 mm. They are dull, dark pitch-brown and very similar to Maladera solida. However, the clypeus is less rounded at the front, more distinctly punctate. The elytra are less coarsely punctate and the pygidium is strongly convex and somewhat less tapered.
