= Megachile walkeri =

Scientific classification
- Domain: Eukaryota
- Kingdom: Animalia
- Phylum: Arthropoda
- Class: Insecta
- Order: Hymenoptera
- Family: Megachilidae
- Genus: Megachile
- Species: M. walkeri

Binomial name
- Megachile walkeri Dalla Torre, 1896

Synonyms
- Megachile fulvescens Walker, 1871 (Homonym); Megachile argentata v. moricei Friese, 1899; Megachile blanda Rebmann, 1968 (Homonym)

Species of leafcutter bee (Megachile)

Megachile walkeri is a species of bee in the family Megachilidae. It was described by Walker in 1871, and renamed by Dalla Torre in 1896.
