= Chondropoma callipeplum =

Conservation status
- Data Deficient (IUCN 2.3)

Scientific classification
- Kingdom: Animalia
- Phylum: Mollusca
- Class: Gastropoda
- Subclass: Caenogastropoda
- Order: Littorinimorpha
- Family: Annulariidae
- Genus: Chondropoma
- Species: C. callipeplum

Binomial name
- Chondropoma callipeplum Solem, 1961

Species of gastropod

Chondropoma callipeplum is a species of small operculate land snail, terrestrial gastropod mollusk in the family Pomatiidae.

This species is endemic to Nicaragua.
