= Schizonycha peringueyi =

Scientific classification
- Kingdom: Animalia
- Phylum: Arthropoda
- Clade: Pancrustacea
- Class: Insecta
- Order: Coleoptera
- Suborder: Polyphaga
- Infraorder: Scarabaeiformia
- Family: Scarabaeidae
- Genus: Schizonycha
- Species: S. peringueyi

Binomial name
- Schizonycha peringueyi Dalla Torre, 1912

Synonyms
- Schizonycha vicaria Péringuey, 1904 (nec. Kolbe)

Species of beetle

Schizonycha peringueyi is a species of beetle of the family Scarabaeidae. It is found in South Africa (Northern Cape).

== Description ==
Adults reach a length of about 15.5 mm (0.61 in). They are very similar to Schizonycha nigricornis, but are larger and the punctures on the pronotum have more irregularly raised edges and the transverse, impunctate areas of the pronotum are more clearly marked.
