= Homopliopsis madacassa =

Scientific classification
- Kingdom: Animalia
- Phylum: Arthropoda
- Class: Insecta
- Order: Coleoptera
- Suborder: Polyphaga
- Infraorder: Scarabaeiformia
- Family: Scarabaeidae
- Genus: Homopliopsis
- Species: H. madacassa

Binomial name
- Homopliopsis madacassa (Dalla Torre, 1913)

Synonyms
- Hoplia madacassa Dalla Torre, 1913; Hoplia maculicollis Fairmaire, 1900; Hoplia validipes Fairmaire, 1897

Species of beetle

Homopliopsis madacassa is a species of beetle of the family Scarabaeidae. It is found in Madagascar.

== Description ==
Adults reach a length of about 7–13 mm (0.28–0.51 in). They have an elongated, fusiform body. The front of the body is dark brown, while the elytra are reddish-brown with fine hairs. The hairs on the pronotum are scaly.
