= Megachile binotulata =

Scientific classification
- Domain: Eukaryota
- Kingdom: Animalia
- Phylum: Arthropoda
- Class: Insecta
- Order: Hymenoptera
- Family: Megachilidae
- Genus: Megachile
- Species: M. binotulata

Binomial name
- Megachile binotulata Dalla Torre, 1896

Species of leafcutter bee (Megachile)

Megachile binotulata is a species of bee in the family Megachilidae. It was described by Karl Wilhelm von Dalla Torre in 1896.
