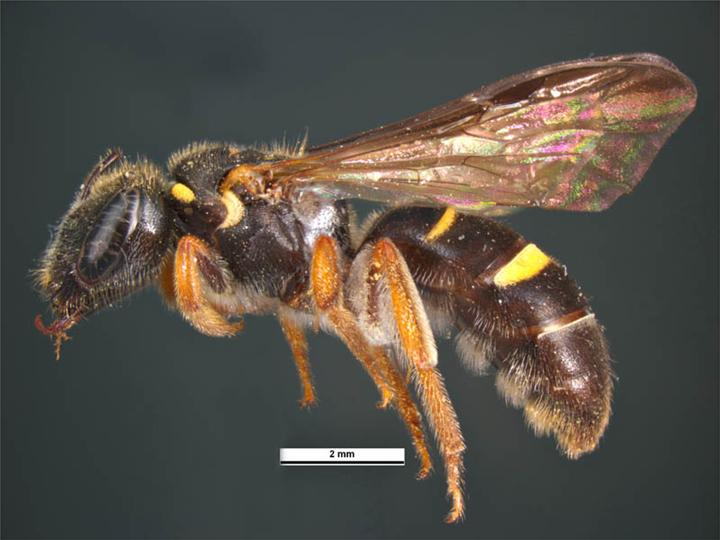
- Female

Scientific classification
- Kingdom: Animalia
- Phylum: Arthropoda
- Clade: Pancrustacea
- Class: Insecta
- Order: Hymenoptera
- Family: Halictidae
- Genus: Lasioglossum
- Species: L. tertium

Binomial name
- Lasioglossum tertium (Dalla Torre, 1896)

Synonyms
- Halictus rufipes Smith, 1853; Halictus tertius Dalla Torre, 1896; Parasphecodes insculptus Cockerell, 1918; Parasphecodes rufitarsus Rayment, 1929; Lasioglossum (Australictus) fulvofasciae Michener, 1965

= Lasioglossum tertium =

Species of bee

Lasioglossum tertium, or Lasioglossum (Australictus) tertium, is a species of bee in the family Halictidae and subfamily Halictinae. It is endemic to Australia. It was described by Austrian entomologist Karl Wilhelm von Dalla Torre in 1896.

== Distribution and habitat ==
The species occurs in south-eastern Australia. Type localities include Mount Tamborine and Cunninghams Gap in Queensland, and Melbourne and Cann River in Victoria.

== Behaviour ==
The adults are flying mellivores.

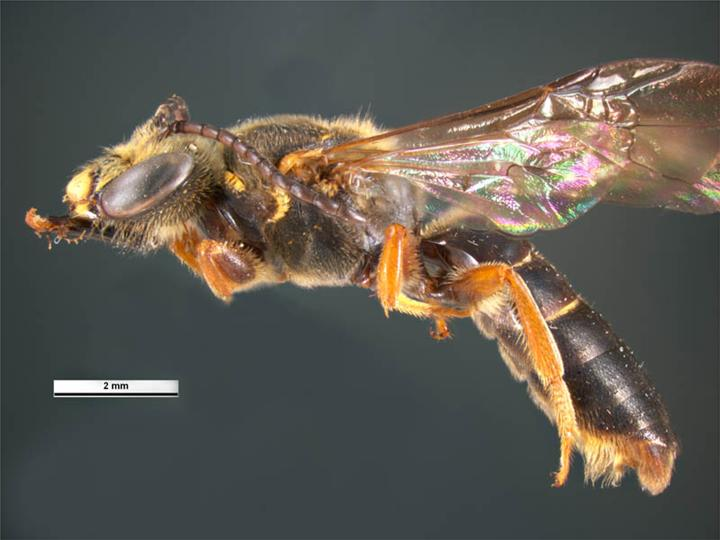
Male
