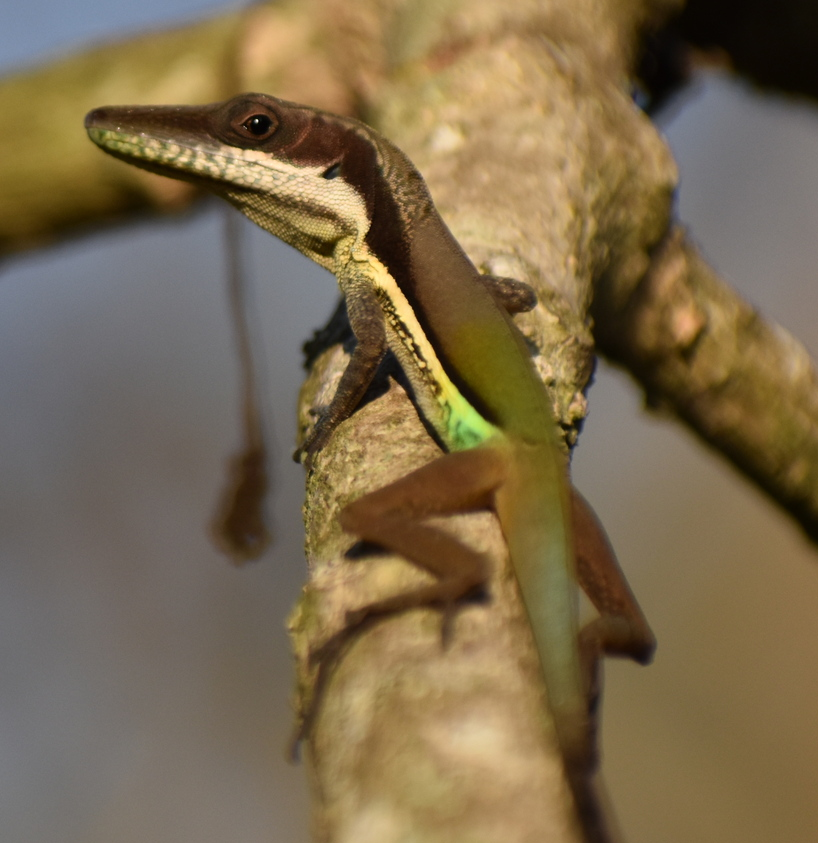

Conservation status
- Vulnerable (IUCN 3.1)

Scientific classification
- Kingdom: Animalia
- Phylum: Chordata
- Class: Reptilia
- Order: Squamata
- Suborder: Iguania
- Family: Dactyloidae
- Genus: Anolis
- Species: A. hendersoni

Binomial name
- Anolis hendersoni Cochran, 1923

= Anolis hendersoni =

Species of lizard

Anolis hendersoni, also known commonly as Henderson's anole and the La Selle long-snouted anole, is a species of lizard in the family Dactyloidae. The species is native to the island of Hispaniola. There are two recognized subspecies.

== Etymology ==
The specific name, hendersoni, is in honor of American malacologist John Brooks Henderson Jr.

== Geographic range ==
A. hendersoni is found in southern Haiti, and in adjacent southwestern Dominican Republic.

== Habitat ==
The preferred natural habitat of A. hendersoni is forest, at altitudes from sea level to 1,750 m (5,740 ft).

== Description ==
Small for its genus, A. hendersoni may attain a snout-to-vent length (SVL) of almost 5 cm (almost 2 inches).

== Reproduction ==
A. hendersoni is oviparous.

== Subspecies ==
There are two subspecies that are recognized as being valid, including the nominotypical subspecies.

- Anolis hendersoni hendersoni Cochran, 1923
- Anolis hendersoni ravidormitans Schwartz, 1978
