= Juannularia =

Scientific classification
- Kingdom: Animalia
- Phylum: Mollusca
- Class: Gastropoda
- Subclass: Caenogastropoda
- Order: Littorinimorpha
- Family: Pomatiidae
- Genus: Juannularia; Torre & Bartsch, 1941

Genus of gastropods

Juannularia is a genus of land snails with an operculum, terrestrial gastropod mollusks in the family Pomatiidae.

== Species ==
Species within the genus Juannularia include:

- Juannularia arguta (Pfeiffer, 1858)
- Juannularia perplicata (Gundlach, 1857)
