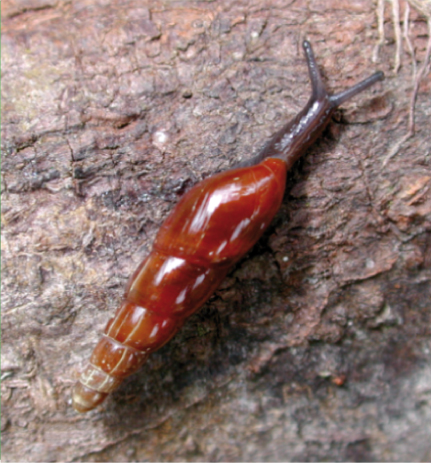

Scientific classification
- Domain: Eukaryota
- Kingdom: Animalia
- Phylum: Mollusca
- Class: Gastropoda
- Order: Stylommatophora
- Family: Oleacinidae
- Genus: Laevaricella
- Species: L. perlucens

Binomial name
- Laevaricella perlucens (Guppy, 1868)

Synonyms
- Glandina perlucens Guppy, 1868

= Laevaricella perlucens =

Species of gastropod

Laevaricella perlucens is a species of tropical, air-breathing land snail, a terrestrial pulmonate gastropod mollusk in the family Oleacinidae.

== Distribution ==
Laevaricella perlucens is endemic to Dominica. The type locality is "on Morne Diablotin, the north end on the island", Dominica.

Laevaricella perlucens is very restricted in range and probably meet the IUCN-criteria of Critically Endangered species.

== Description ==
Laevaricella perlucens was originally discovered and described (under the name Glandina perlucens) by British-born naturalist Robert John Lechmere Guppy in 1868.

Guppy's original text (the type description) reads in Latin language and in English language as follows:

Glandina perlucens, n. sp.

Testa subulate-turrita, laevis, diaphana, fusco-flavida, vix striatula, lineis distautibus ornata; apex obtusissimus; anfractus 7, parum convexi, lente accrescentes, ultimas applanatus, spirse longitudinem circiter sequans; sutura valde impressa; columella valde torta, truncata; peristoma simplex, margine externo aliquanto prominente.

Long, 16 millim., lat. maj. 4 millim.; apart, alt. 4, lat. 2.

A subulate-turreted, smooth, brilliantly polished, yellowish-red shell, marked by obscure striae and by distant variciform lines, of which there are from three to six on a whorl; with a very obtuse apex and seven slowly increasing, scarcely convex whorls, the last somewhat flattened and equal to about half the length of the shell; columella strongly curved, truncate; aperture oval, elongate; peristome simple, its external margin somewhat prominent.

A species allied to G. afrcuata., Pf., of Jamaica. Of three examples I obtained, one only was of full growth.

This species had never been collected since it was described by Guppy (1868) until 2009 and his type material was subsequently lost. The single specimen collected alive in 2009 allowed figure this species for the first time.

== Ecology ==
This species is restricted to higher localities. It does not occur, however, on the upper slopes of the higher peaks, but it seems to be restricted to the hygrophytic vegetation zone (cloud forest).
