= Bohaispiridae =

Scientific classification
- Kingdom: Animalia
- Phylum: Mollusca
- Class: Gastropoda
- Subclass: Caenogastropoda
- Order: Littorinimorpha
- Superfamily: Littorinoidea
- Family: †Bohaispiridae; Youluo, 1978

Extinct family of gastropods

Bohaispiridae is an extinct family of sea snails, marine gastropod molluscs in the clade Littorinimorpha.

According to taxonomy of the Gastropoda by Bouchet & Rocroi (2005) the family Bohaispiridae has no subfamily.
