= Homopliopsis lugubris =

Scientific classification
- Kingdom: Animalia
- Phylum: Arthropoda
- Class: Insecta
- Order: Coleoptera
- Suborder: Polyphaga
- Infraorder: Scarabaeiformia
- Family: Scarabaeidae
- Genus: Homopliopsis
- Species: H. lugubris

Binomial name
- Homopliopsis lugubris (Fairmaire, 1903)

Synonyms
- Hoplia lugubris Fairmaire, 1903

Species of beetle

Homopliopsis lugubris is a species of beetle of the family Scarabaeidae. It is found in Madagascar.

== Description ==
Adults reach a length of about 9–12 mm (0.35–0.47 in). They have a short, oval body. The upper surface is black with fine hairs.
