= Tripartellidae =

Scientific classification
- Kingdom: Animalia
- Phylum: Mollusca
- Class: Gastropoda
- Subclass: Caenogastropoda
- Order: Littorinimorpha
- Superfamily: Littorinoidea
- Family: †Tripartellidae; Gründel, 2001

Family of gastropods

The Tripartellidae are an extinct family of fossil sea snails, marine gastropod molluscs in the clade Littorinimorpha.

According to the taxonomy of the Gastropoda by Bouchet & Rocroi (2005), the family Tripartellidae has no subfamilies.

== Genera ==
Genera within the family Tripartellidae include:

- Tripartella Gründel 1998, the type genus
