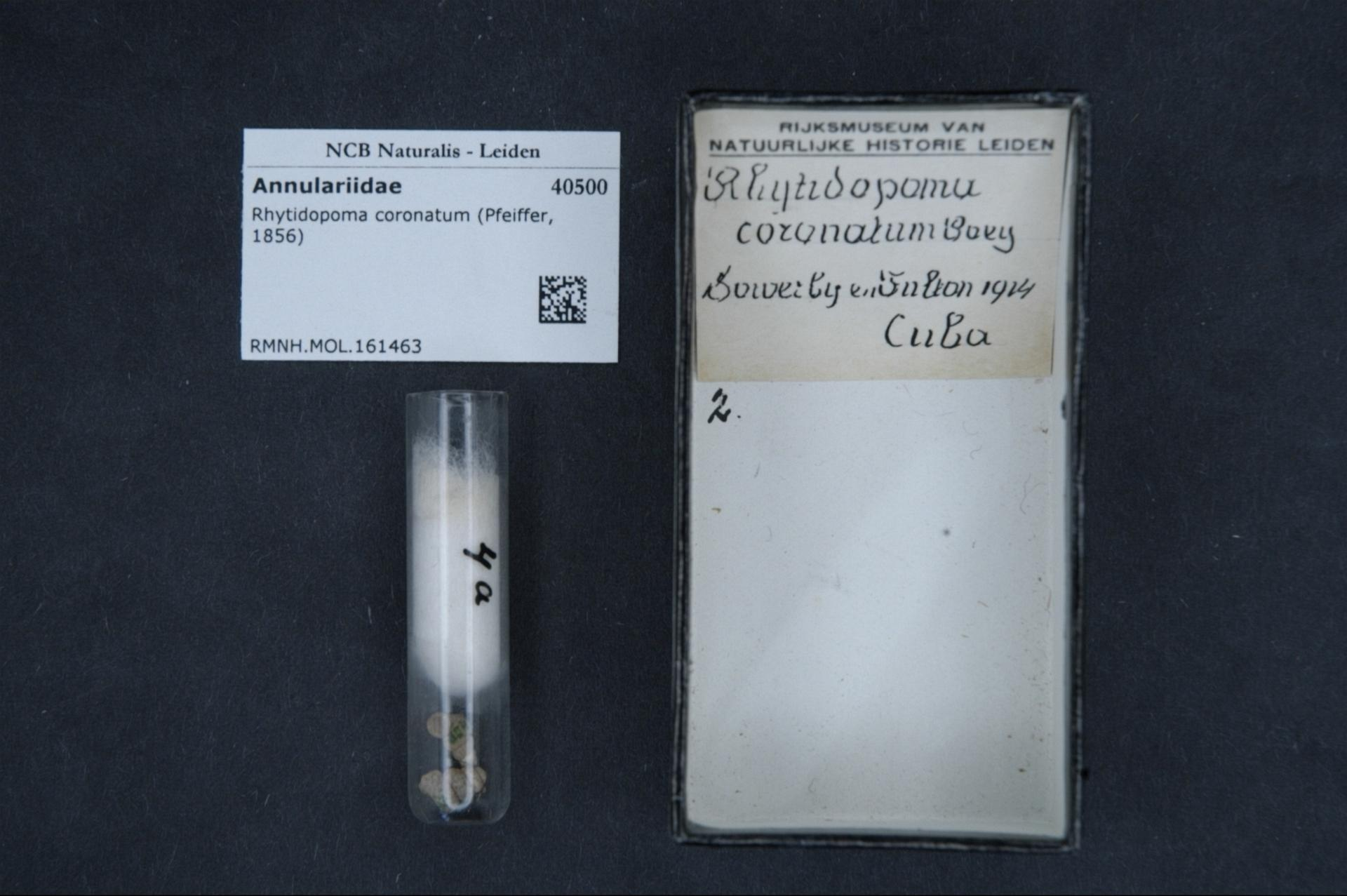

Scientific classification
- Domain: Eukaryota
- Kingdom: Animalia
- Phylum: Mollusca
- Class: Gastropoda
- Subclass: Caenogastropoda
- Order: Littorinimorpha
- Family: Pomatiidae
- Subfamily: Annulariinae
- Tribe: Rhytidopomatini
- Genus: Rhytidopoma
- Species: R. coronatum

Binomial name
- Rhytidopoma coronatum (Poey in Pfeiffer, 1856)

Synonyms
- Rhytidiopoma coronatum [orth. error]

= Rhytidopoma coronatum =

Species of gastropod

Rhytidopoma coronatum is a species of an operculate land snail, terrestrial gastropod mollusk in the family Pomatiidae.

== Distribution ==
This species lives in Cuba, for example at Escaleras de Jaruco.

== Ecology ==
Rhytidopoma coronatum is a rock dwelling species.

Predators of Rhytidopoma coronatum include larvae of firefly bug Alecton discoidalis.
