= Eutudora jimenoi =

Scientific classification
- Domain: Eukaryota
- Kingdom: Animalia
- Phylum: Mollusca
- Class: Gastropoda
- Subclass: Caenogastropoda
- Order: Littorinimorpha
- Family: Pomatiidae
- Genus: Eutudora
- Species: E. jimenoi

Binomial name
- Eutudora jimenoi (Arango in Pfeiffer, 1864)

Species of gastropod

Eutudora jimenoi is a species of an operculate land snail, terrestrial gastropod mollusk in the family Pomatiidae.

== Distribution ==
This species lives in Cuba.

== Ecology ==
Eutudora jimenoi is a rock dwelling species.

Predators of Eutudora jimenoi include larvae of firefly bug Alecton discoidalis.
