= Blaesospira =

Scientific classification
- Kingdom: Animalia
- Phylum: Mollusca
- Class: Gastropoda
- Subclass: Caenogastropoda
- Order: Littorinimorpha
- Superfamily: Littorinoidea
- Family: Pomatiidae
- Genus: Blaesospira; Crosse, 1890

Genus of gastropods

Blaesospira is a genus of land snails with an operculum, terrestrial gastropod mollusks in the family Pomatiidae.

== Species ==
Species within the genus Blaesospira include:

- Blaesospira echinus (Wright in Pfeiffer, 1864) - type species
- Blaesospira hortensiae Jaume, 1984
