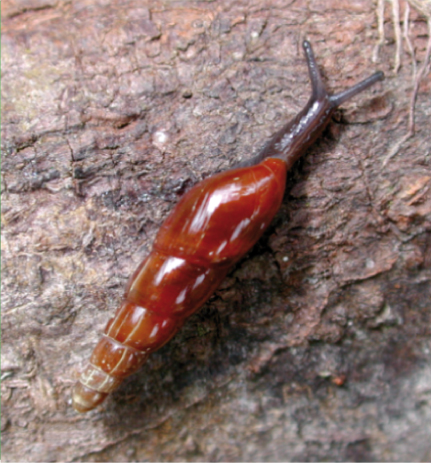
- Laevaricella perlucens

Scientific classification
- Kingdom: Animalia
- Phylum: Mollusca
- Class: Gastropoda
- Order: Stylommatophora
- Family: Oleacinidae
- Subfamily: Varicellinae
- Genus: Laevaricella; Pilsbry, 1907

= Laevaricella =

Genus of gastropods

Laevaricella is a genus of tropical, air-breathing land snails, terrestrial pulmonate gastropod mollusks in the family Oleacinidae.

== Species ==
Species within the genus Laevaricella include:

- Laevaricella glabra (Pfeiffer, 1846)
- Laevaricella guadeloupensis (Pfeiffer, 1856)
- Laevaricella interrupta (Shuttleworth, 1854)
- Laevaricella perlucens (Guppy, 1868)
- Laevaricella semitarum (Pfeiffer, 1842) - type species
- Laevaricella playa H. B. Baker, 1940 - photo
