= Lucio pictum =

- Male
- Female

Scientific classification
- Kingdom: Animalia
- Phylum: Arthropoda
- Clade: Pancrustacea
- Class: Insecta
- Order: Coleoptera
- Suborder: Polyphaga
- Infraorder: Elateriformia
- Family: Lampyridae
- Genus: Lucio
- Species: L. pictum

Binomial name
- Lucio pictum (Gorham, 1880)

Synonyms
- Lamprocera picta Gorham, 1880

Species of beetle

Lucio pictum is a species of beetle of the family Lampyridae. It is found in Brazil, Peru, Nicaragua, Panama and Guatemala.

== Description ==
Adults reach a length of about 15–16.9 mm (0.59–0.67 in) for males and 18–17.1 mm (0.71–0.67 in) for females. The body is dark brown. On the pronotum, the disc and lateral margins are dark brown to black, while the anterior margins are yellow with an extension of the dark brown to black area of the disc. The elytra are brown to black, with a yellowish horizontal stripe. The abdomen is dark brown with sternum VIII pale white to translucent and with a pair of paler rounded spots (possibly reduced light organs).
