= Homopliopsis oculata =

Scientific classification
- Kingdom: Animalia
- Phylum: Arthropoda
- Class: Insecta
- Order: Coleoptera
- Suborder: Polyphaga
- Infraorder: Scarabaeiformia
- Family: Scarabaeidae
- Genus: Homopliopsis
- Species: H. oculata

Binomial name
- Homopliopsis oculata (Fairmaire, 1886)

Synonyms
- Hoplia oculata Fairmaire, 1886; Hoplia impressidorsis Fairmaire, 1897

Species of beetle

Homopliopsis oculata is a species of beetle of the family Scarabaeidae. It is found in Madagascar.

== Description ==
Adults reach a length of about 5–9 mm (0.20–0.35 in). They have an oval body. The upper surface is brownish-black and densely covered with yellow scales.
