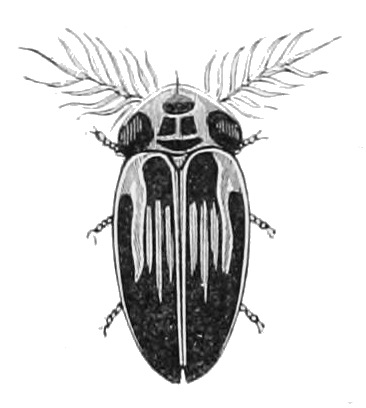
- Lamprocera latreillei

Scientific classification
- Kingdom: Animalia
- Phylum: Arthropoda
- Clade: Pancrustacea
- Class: Insecta
- Order: Coleoptera
- Suborder: Polyphaga
- Infraorder: Elateriformia
- Family: Lampyridae
- Subfamily: Lampyrinae
- Tribe: Lamprocerini; E. Olivier, 1907

= Lamprocerini =

Tribe of beetles

The Lamprocerini are a tribe of fireflies in the large subfamily Lampyrinae, though at least some Lamprocerini species are not bioluminescent in the adult stage. They are generally neotropical, found in North America only as vagrants.

== Systematics ==
The group has recently been examined using molecular phylogenetics, using fairly comprehensive sampling.

== Genera ==
- Alecton Laporte, 1833
- Lamprocera Laporte, 1833
- Lucernuta Laporte, 1833
- Lucio Laporte, 1833
- Lychnacris Motschulsky, 1853
- Tenaspis LeConte, 1881
