= Chondrothyrium =

Scientific classification
- Kingdom: Animalia
- Phylum: Mollusca
- Class: Gastropoda
- Subclass: Caenogastropoda
- Order: Littorinimorpha
- Family: Pomatiidae
- Genus: Chondrothyrium; Henderson & Bartsch, 1920

Genus of gastropods

Chondrothyrium is a genus of land snails with an operculum, terrestrial gastropod mollusks in the family Pomatiidae.

== Species ==
Species within the genus Chondrothyrium include:

- Chondrothyrium alcaldei Jaume & Sánchez de Fuentes, 1943
- Chondrothyrium borroi Jaume & Sánchez de Fuentes, 1943
- Chondrothyrium crenimargo (Pfeiffer, 1858)
- Chondrothyrium mortiarum Sánchez Roig, 1951
- Chondrothyrium tejedori Sánchez Roig, 1951
- Chondrothyrium torrei Jaume & Sánchez de Fuentes, 1943
- Chondrothyrium violaceum (Pfeiffer, 1858)
