= Lucio rufiventris =

Scientific classification
- Kingdom: Animalia
- Phylum: Arthropoda
- Clade: Pancrustacea
- Class: Insecta
- Order: Coleoptera
- Suborder: Polyphaga
- Infraorder: Elateriformia
- Family: Lampyridae
- Genus: Lucio
- Species: L. rufiventris

Binomial name
- Lucio rufiventris Olivier, 1885

Synonyms
- Lamprocera abdominalis Gorham, 1880

Species of beetle

Lucio rufiventris is a species of beetle of the family Lampyridae. It is found in Brazil.
