= Tenaspis =

Scientific classification
- Kingdom: Animalia
- Phylum: Arthropoda
- Class: Insecta
- Order: Coleoptera
- Suborder: Polyphaga
- Infraorder: Elateriformia
- Family: Lampyridae
- Subfamily: Lampyrinae
- Tribe: Lamprocerini
- Genus: Tenaspis; LeConte, 1881

Genus of beetles

Tenaspis is a genus of fireflies in the beetle family Lampyridae. There are about 18 described species in Tenaspis.

== Species ==
These 18 species belong to the genus Tenaspis:

- Tenaspis acuta E. Olivier, 1909
- Tenaspis angularis (Gorham, 1880)
- Tenaspis auricolor E. Olivier, 1911
- Tenaspis brumalis E. Olivier in Wytsman, 1907
- Tenaspis cauta E. Olivier, 1911
- Tenaspis figurata E. Olivier, 1912
- Tenaspis fulvibasis E. Olivier, 1911
- Tenaspis gonzalensis Zaragoza-Caballero, 1995
- Tenaspis gonzalenzis Zaragoza, 1995
- Tenaspis lugubris (Gorham, 1881)
- Tenaspis maculata Pic, 1932
- Tenaspis mansueta E. Olivier in Wytsman, 1907
- Tenaspis mundata E. Olivier, 1907
- Tenaspis peccata Blackwelder, 1945
- Tenaspis rufibasis E. Olivier, 1909
- Tenaspis semifusca (Gorham, 1880)
- Tenaspis sinuosa E. Olivier, 1899
- Tenaspis zonulata E. Olivier, 1913
