= Tenaspis angularis =

Conservation status
- Data Deficient (IUCN 3.1)

Scientific classification
- Kingdom: Animalia
- Phylum: Arthropoda
- Class: Insecta
- Order: Coleoptera
- Suborder: Polyphaga
- Infraorder: Elateriformia
- Family: Lampyridae
- Genus: Tenaspis
- Species: T. angularis

Binomial name
- Tenaspis angularis (Gorham, 1880)

Species of beetle

Tenaspis angularis is a species of firefly in the beetle family Lampyridae. It is found in Central America and North America.
