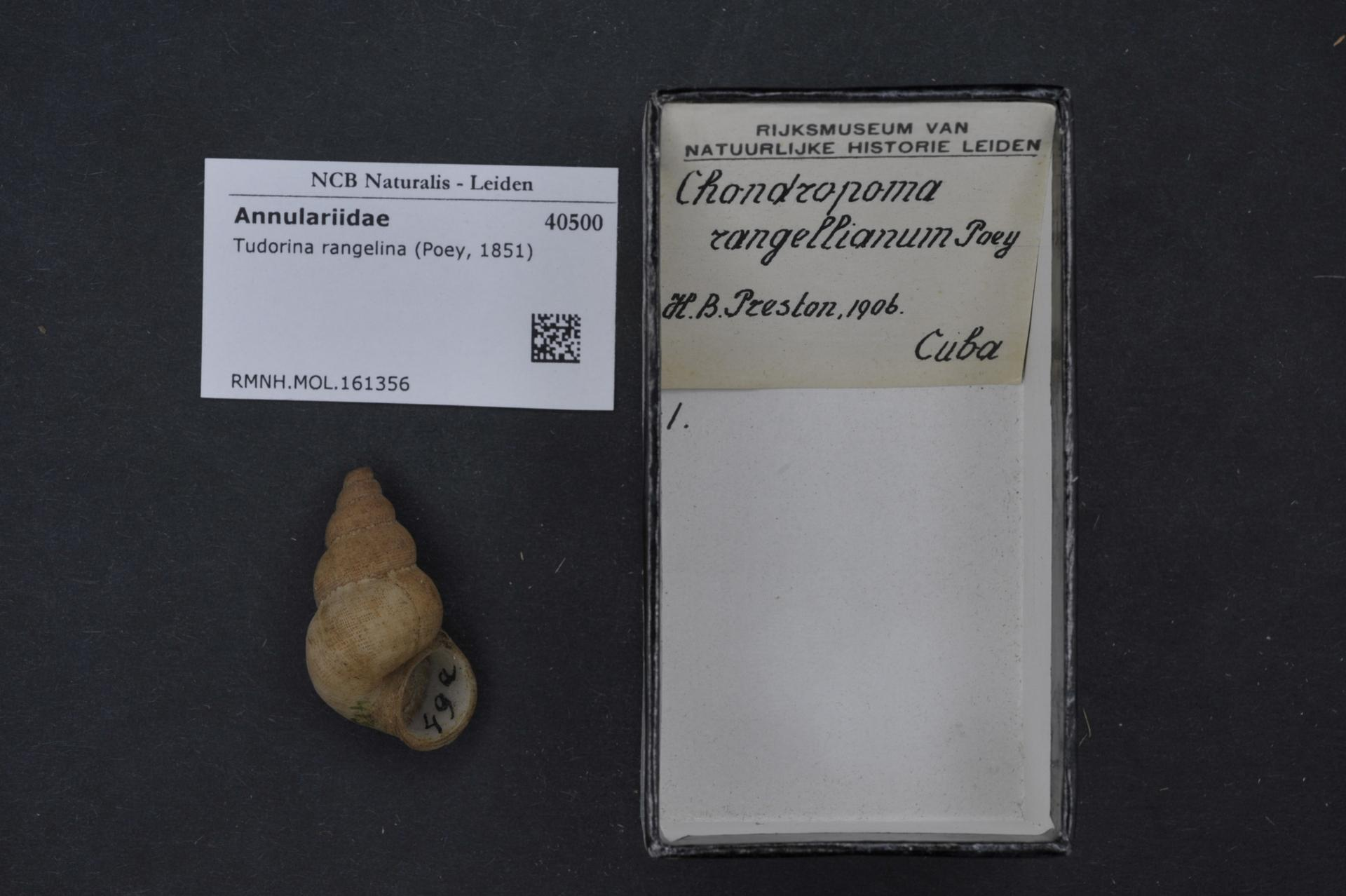
- Mollusc shell

Scientific classification
- Kingdom: Animalia
- Phylum: Mollusca
- Class: Gastropoda
- Subclass: Caenogastropoda
- Order: Littorinimorpha
- Family: Pomatiidae
- Genus: Tudorina; Torre & Bartsch, 1941

= Tudorina =

Genus of gastropods

Tudorina is a genus of land snails with an operculum, terrestrial gastropod mollusks in the family Pomatiidae.

== Species ==
Species within the genus Tudorina include:

- Tudorina rangelina (Poey, 1851)
