= Homopliopsis bicolor =

Scientific classification
- Kingdom: Animalia
- Phylum: Arthropoda
- Class: Insecta
- Order: Coleoptera
- Suborder: Polyphaga
- Infraorder: Scarabaeiformia
- Family: Scarabaeidae
- Genus: Homopliopsis
- Species: H. bicolor

Binomial name
- Homopliopsis bicolor (Fairmaire, 1886)

Synonyms
- Hoplia bicolor Fairmaire, 1886

Species of beetle

Homopliopsis bicolor is a species of beetle of the family Scarabaeidae. It is found in Madagascar.

== Description ==
Adults reach a length of about 5–6 mm (0.20–0.24 in). They have a rather short, oval body. The front of the body is blackish, while the elytra are yellowish-brown.
