= Lucio (beetle) =

Scientific classification
- Kingdom: Animalia
- Phylum: Arthropoda
- Clade: Pancrustacea
- Class: Insecta
- Order: Coleoptera
- Suborder: Polyphaga
- Infraorder: Elateriformia
- Family: Lampyridae
- Subfamily: Lampyrinae
- Tribe: Lamprocerini
- Genus: Lucio; Laporte, 1833

Genus of beetles

Lucio is a genus of beetles belonging to the family Lampyridae.

== Species ==
- Lucio abdominale Laporte, 1833
- Lucio blattinum (Perty, 1830)
- Lucio brunneum (E. Olivier, 1883)
- Lucio castelnaui Kirsch, 1865
- Lucio dimidiatum E. Olivier, 1885
- Lucio discolor E. Olivier, 1899
- Lucio diversum E. Olivier, 1912
- Lucio guttiferum E. Olivier, 1895
- Lucio heterobasis E. Olivier, 1911
- Lucio maerens E. Olivier, 1912
- Lucio melanurum E. Olivier, 1885
- Lucio oblectatum E. Olivier, 1911
- Lucio obscurum E. Olivier, 1885
- Lucio pictum Gorham, 1880
- Lucio rufiventris E. Olivier, 1885
- Lucio splendens E. Olivier, 1885
