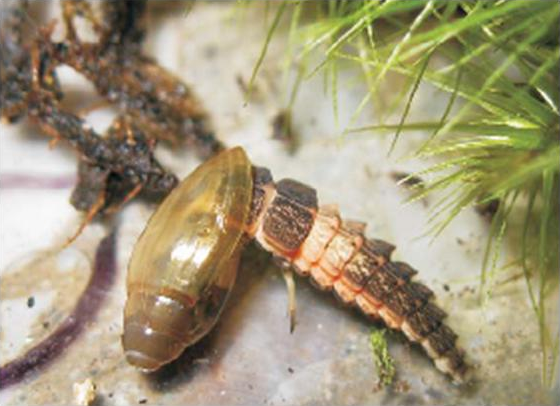
- A larva of Alecton discoidalis preying on a pulmonate land snail in the genus Oleacina

Scientific classification
- Kingdom: Animalia
- Phylum: Arthropoda
- Clade: Pancrustacea
- Class: Insecta
- Order: Coleoptera
- Suborder: Polyphaga
- Infraorder: Elateriformia
- Family: Lampyridae
- Genus: Alecton
- Species: A. discoidalis

Binomial name
- Alecton discoidalis Laporte, 1833

= Alecton discoidalis =

Species of beetle

Alecton discoidalis is a species of firefly in the beetle family Lampyridae, commonly known as the Cuban endemic firefly. The larvae of this species are predators on both pulmonate and operculate land snails. Alecton discoidalis is the type species of the genus Alecton.

== Distribution ==
Alecton is the only genus of firefly endemic to Cuba and A. discoidalis is the best known of the four species in that genus. It is found in the western half of the country. The type locality was described simply as "the island of Cuba".

== Description ==
Alecton discoidalis was discovered and described (based on the larva only) by the French naturalist Francis de Laporte de Castelnau in 1833. His type description in French reads as follows:

Alecton Discoidalis. Long. 4½, larg. 2⅓. Jaune, extrémité des antennes et élytres noires, ces dernières avec une bordure latérale jaune qui commence vers le tiers de la longueur. — Ile de Cuba.

This translates as: Yellow, with the tips of the antennae and the elytra black, with a yellow border which starts a third of the way along the elytra.

== Biology ==
The fireflies of Cuba have not been extensively studied. Research was undertaken in 2009 to examine the association of the larvae with terrestrial gastropods and to learn more about the natural history of the species. Larvae of A. discoidalis were collected in limestone regions of Cuba where they were frequently found in the vicinity of snails. Most collections were made at night at which time the larvae could often be detected when they emitted flashes of light. Representatives of several different instar stages were gathered from leaf litter and from on or under rocks. At the same time, snails of a number of species were collected to determine which species would be the preferred prey for the larvae. The temperature at the time of collection ranged from 26 to 32 °C and the humidity ranged from 64 to 86%. These levels were maintained in the laboratory during research.

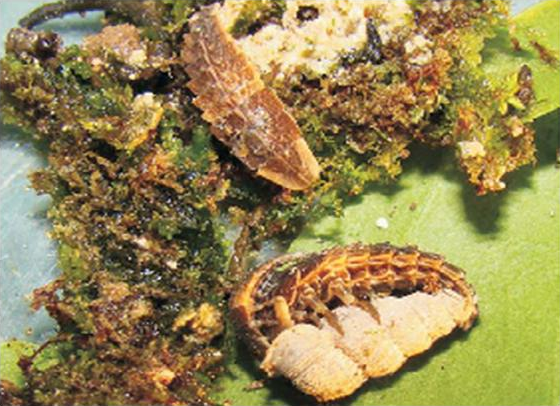
An early stage larva of Alecton discoidalis feeding on the land snail Torrella immersa in captivity

The most vulnerable snails seemed to be those that live on the ground or rocks, but tree-dwelling species were also targeted occasionally. Acceptable prey species included snails from several families: family Helicinidae (Helicina aspersa, Ustronia sloanei, Alcadia hispida, Emoda sagraiana), family Pomatiidae (Chondropoma pictum, Chondropoma auberianum, Chondropoma irradians, Eutudora jimenoi, Torrella immersa, Rhytidopoma coronatum), family Megalomastomatidae (Farcimen tortum), family Oleacinidae (Oleacina sp.) and family Polygyridae (Praticolella griseola). Snails that were rejected by these larvae as food included Pycnoptychia species and Liguus fasciatus.

It was found that attacks took place both during the day and at night with the operculum of the snail being targeted. The larva spent up to 24 hours inside the shell devouring the soft tissues. Sometimes several first-instar larvae attacked a single snail at the same time. On some occasions, the snails H. aspersa and C. pictum emitted a protective foam which enabled them to thwart the attack.

When the larvae were sufficiently grown, they pupated and the adult firefly later emerged. The identity of the imago had not previously been known.
