= Homopliopsis peyrierasi =

Scientific classification
- Kingdom: Animalia
- Phylum: Arthropoda
- Class: Insecta
- Order: Coleoptera
- Suborder: Polyphaga
- Infraorder: Scarabaeiformia
- Family: Scarabaeidae
- Genus: Homopliopsis
- Species: H. peyrierasi

Binomial name
- Homopliopsis peyrierasi Lacroix, 1998

Species of beetle

Homopliopsis peyrierasi is a species of beetle of the family Scarabaeidae. It is found in Madagascar.

== Description ==
Adults reach a length of about 7–8 mm (0.28–0.31 in). They have a rather elongated body. The upper surface is blackish. The pronotum has scaly hairs. The hairs on the elytra are also scaly, and more abundant in places.
