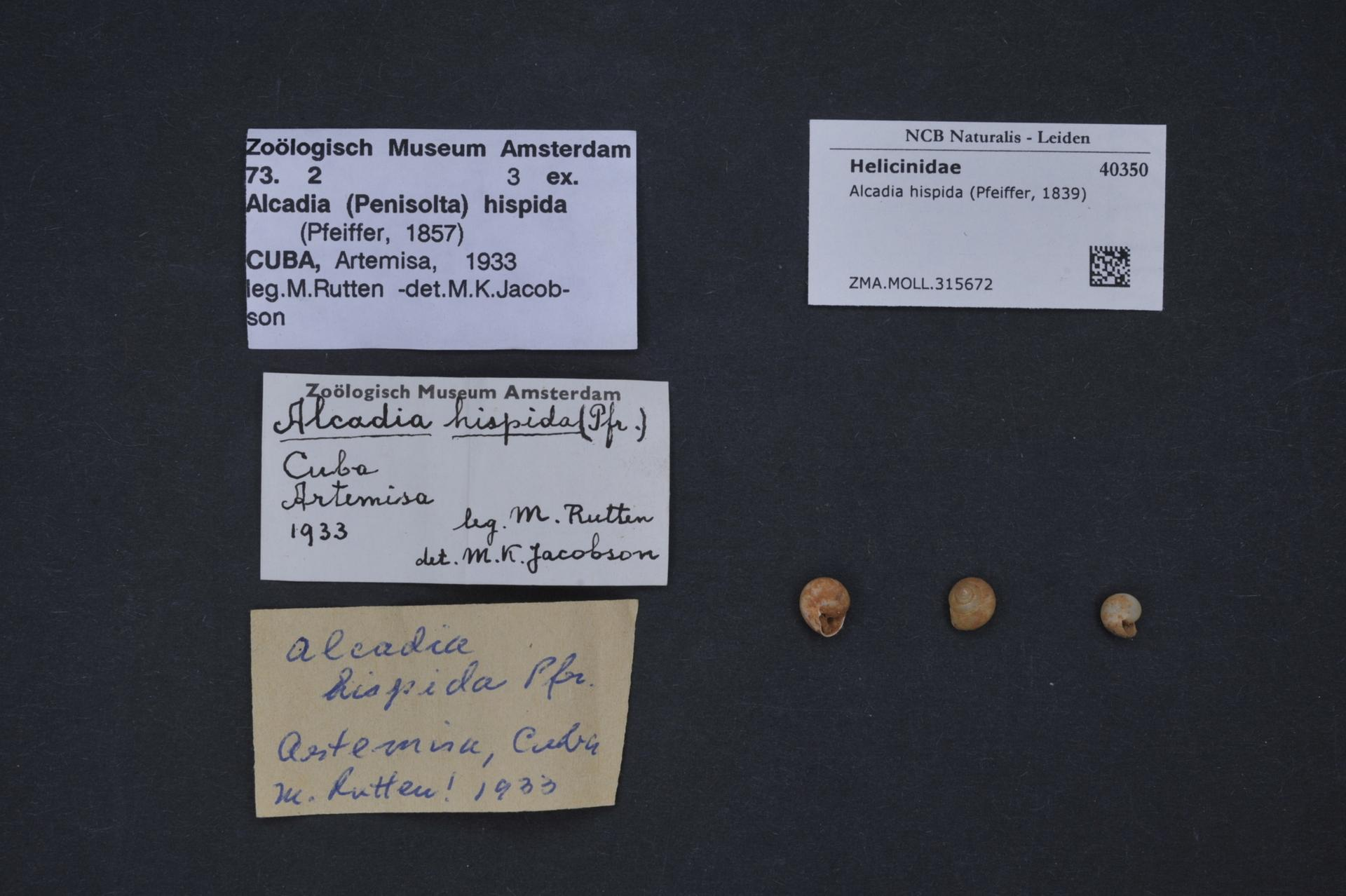
- Shell of Alcadia hispida (specimen at Naturalis Biodiversity Center)

Scientific classification
- Kingdom: Animalia
- Phylum: Mollusca
- Class: Gastropoda
- Order: Cycloneritida
- Family: Helicinidae
- Genus: Alcadia
- Species: A. hispida

Binomial name
- Alcadia hispida (Pfeiffer, 1839)

Synonyms
- Alcadia (Penisoltia) hispida (L. Pfeiffer, 1893) alternative representation; Helicina dentigera A. d'Orbigny, 1842 (junior synonym); Helicina hispida L. Pfeiffer, 1839 (original combination)

= Alcadia hispida =

Species of gastropod

Alcadia hispida is a species of an operculate land snail, terrestrial gastropod mollusk in the family Helicinidae.

== Description ==
(Original description in Latin) The reddish shell is globular-depressed, thin and bristly. It features four slightly convex whorls. The columellar callus is thin, and the columellar angle is sharply toothed. The outer lip is somewhat thickened and sharply notched near the denticle. The aperture is sublunate.

== Distribution ==
This species lives in Cuba.

== Ecology ==
Alcadia hispida is a ground dwelling species.

Predators of Alcadia hispida include larvae of firefly bug Alecton discoidalis.
