= Homopliopsis =

Scientific classification
- Kingdom: Animalia
- Phylum: Arthropoda
- Class: Insecta
- Order: Coleoptera
- Suborder: Polyphaga
- Infraorder: Scarabaeiformia
- Family: Scarabaeidae
- Subfamily: Melolonthinae
- Tribe: Hopliini
- Genus: Homopliopsis; Lacroix, 1998

Genus of leaf beetles

Homopliopsis is a genus of beetles belonging to the family Scarabaeidae.

== Species ==
- Homopliopsis bicolor (Fairmaire, 1886)
- Homopliopsis dorri (Fairmaire, 1899)
- Homopliopsis lugubris (Fairmaire, 1903)
- Homopliopsis madacassa (Dalla Torre, 1913)
- Homopliopsis oculata (Fairmaire, 1886)
- Homopliopsis peyrierasi Lacroix, 1998
