= Homopliopsis dorri =

Scientific classification
- Kingdom: Animalia
- Phylum: Arthropoda
- Clade: Pancrustacea
- Class: Insecta
- Order: Coleoptera
- Suborder: Polyphaga
- Infraorder: Scarabaeiformia
- Family: Scarabaeidae
- Genus: Homopliopsis
- Species: H. dorri

Binomial name
- Homopliopsis dorri (Fairmaire, 1899)

Synonyms
- Monochelus dorri Fairmaire, 1899

Species of beetle

Homopliopsis dorri is a species of beetle of the family Scarabaeidae. It is found in Madagascar.

== Description ==
Adults reach a length of about 6.5–8 mm (0.26–0.31 in). They have a short body. The front of the body is blackish, while the elytra are brownish-orange.
