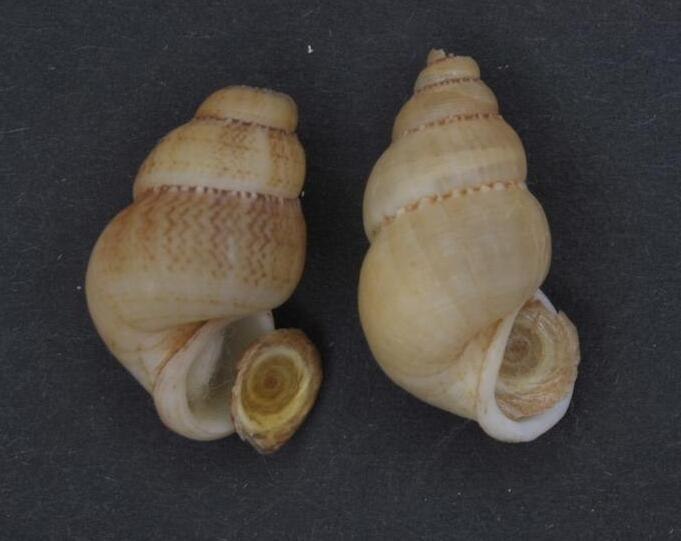
- Annularita majuscula

Scientific classification
- Kingdom: Animalia
- Phylum: Mollusca
- Class: Gastropoda
- Subclass: Caenogastropoda
- Order: Littorinimorpha
- Family: Pomatiidae
- Genus: Annularita; Henderson & Bartsch, 1920

= Annularita =

Genus of gastropods

Annularita is a genus of land snails with an operculum, terrestrial gastropod mollusks in the family Pomatiidae.

== Species ==
Species within the genus Annularita include:

- Annularita majuscula (Morelet, 1851)
