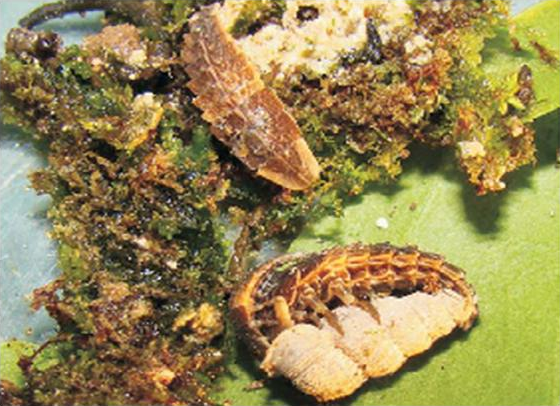
- A live individual of Rhytidopoma immersum has become a food item for one of two early stage larvae of Alecton discoidalis in captivity.

Scientific classification
- Domain: Eukaryota
- Kingdom: Animalia
- Phylum: Mollusca
- Class: Gastropoda
- Subclass: Caenogastropoda
- Order: Littorinimorpha
- Family: Pomatiidae
- Subfamily: Annulariinae
- Tribe: Rhytidopomatini
- Genus: Rhytidopoma
- Species: R. immersum

Binomial name
- Rhytidopoma immersum (Gundlach, 1857)

Synonyms
- Cyclostoma immersum Gundlach, 1857; Torrella immersa (Gundlach, 1857)

= Rhytidopoma immersum =

Species of gastropod

Rhytidopoma immersum is a species of an operculate land snail, terrestrial gastropod mollusk in the family Pomatiidae.

== Distribution ==
This species lives in Cuba, for example at Pan de Matanzas.

== Ecology ==
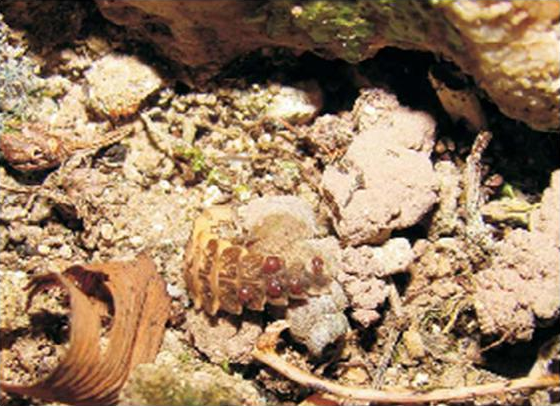
Larva of Alecton discoidalis feeding on Rhytidopoma immersum in nature.

This snail is usually a rock-dwelling species.

Predators of Rhytidopoma immersum include larvae of the firefly bug Alecton discoidalis.

== Subspecies ==
These five subspecies belong to the species Rhytidopoma immersum:

- Rhytidopoma immersum camaronense (de la Torre & Bartsch, 1941)
- Rhytidopoma immersum grillense (de la Torre & Bartsch, 1941)
- Rhytidopoma immersum immersum (Gundlach, 1857)
- Rhytidopoma immersum nodiferum (Arango, 1881)
- Rhytidopoma immersum persea Aguayo & Jaume, 1954
