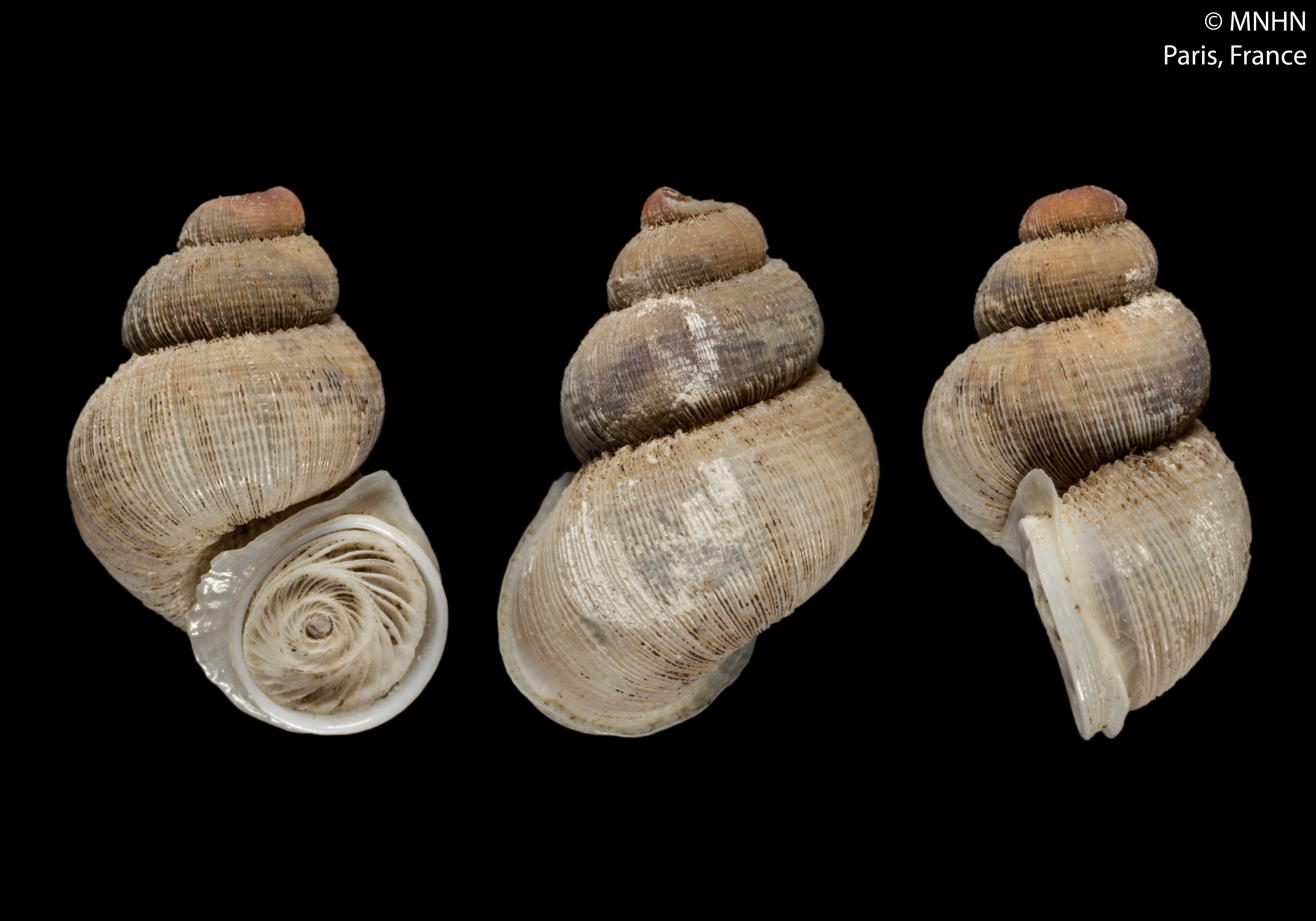
- Shell of Rhytidothyra bilabiata (syntype at MNHN, Paris)

Scientific classification
- Kingdom: Animalia
- Phylum: Mollusca
- Class: Gastropoda
- Subclass: Caenogastropoda
- Order: Littorinimorpha
- Family: Pomatiidae
- Genus: Rhytidothyra; Henderson & Bartsch, 1920

Type species
- Cyclostoma bilabiatum d'Orbigny, 1842

= Rhytidothyra =

Genus of gastropods

Rhytidothyra is a genus of land snails with an operculum, terrestrial gastropod mollusks in the family Pomatiidae.

== Species ==
Species within the genus Rhytidothyra include:

- Rhytidothyra bilabiata (d’Orbigny, 1842)
- Rhytidothyra jacobsoni Alcalde, 1948
