= Lucio castelnaui =

Scientific classification
- Kingdom: Animalia
- Phylum: Arthropoda
- Clade: Pancrustacea
- Class: Insecta
- Order: Coleoptera
- Suborder: Polyphaga
- Infraorder: Elateriformia
- Family: Lampyridae
- Genus: Lucio
- Species: L. castelnaui

Binomial name
- Lucio castelnaui (Kirsch, 1865)

Synonyms
- Lamprocera castelnaui Kirsch, 1865

Species of beetle

Lucio castelnaui is a species of beetle of the family Lampyridae. It is found in Argentina, Brazil and Colombia.
