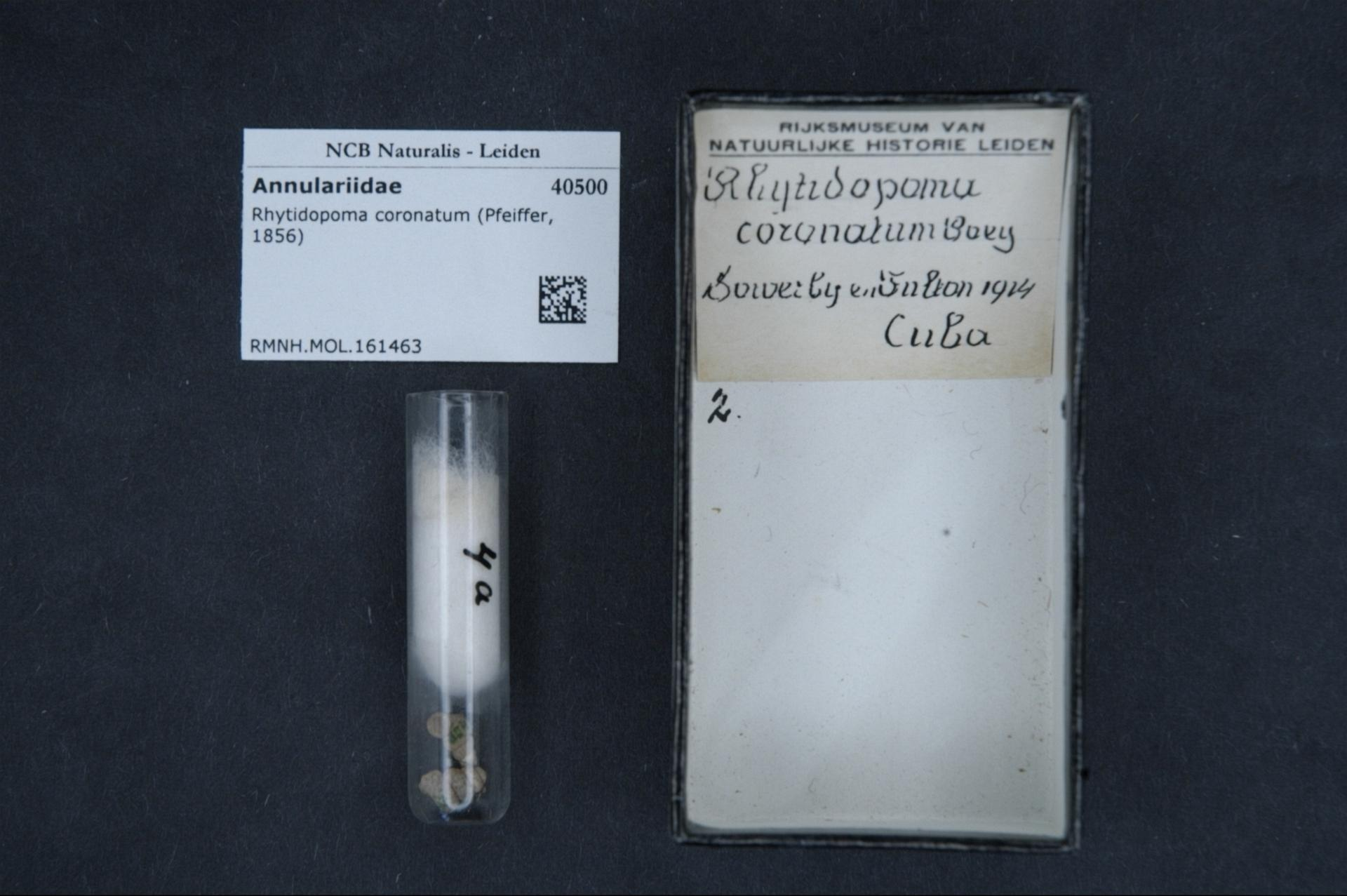
- Rhytidopoma coronatum

Scientific classification
- Kingdom: Animalia
- Phylum: Mollusca
- Class: Gastropoda
- Subclass: Caenogastropoda
- Order: Littorinimorpha
- Family: Pomatiidae
- Subfamily: Annulariinae
- Tribe: Rhytidopomatini
- Genus: Rhytidopoma; Sykes, 1901

Synonyms
- Torrella J.B.Henderson & Bartsch, 1920; Torrellisca J.B.Henderson & Bartsch, 1920; Ctenopoma L.Pfeiffer, 1856

= Rhytidopoma =

Genus of gastropods

Rhytidopoma is a genus of land snails with an operculum, terrestrial gastropod mollusks in the family Pomatiidae.

Rhytidopoma is the type genus of the tribe Rhytidopomatini.

== Species ==
These species belong to the genus Rhytidopoma:

- Rhytidopoma clathratum (Gould, 1842)
- Rhytidopoma coronatum (Poey in Pfeiffer, 1856)
- Rhytidopoma deficiens (Gundlach, 1857)
- Rhytidopoma emmae (Jaume & Sánchez de Fuentes, 1943)
- Rhytidopoma hespericum Torre & Bartsch, 1941
- Rhytidopoma honestum (Poey, 1851)
- Rhytidopoma immersum (Gundlach, 1857)
- Rhytidopoma isabelae Aguayo & Jaume, 1953
- Rhytidopoma nodulatum (Poey, 1851)
- Rhytidopoma occidentale Torre & Bartsch, 1941
- Rhytidopoma pinense Torre & Bartsch, 1941
- Rhytidopoma rugulosum (Pfeiffer, 1839)
- Rhytidopoma scalarinum Jaume & Sánchez de Fuentes, 1944
- Rhytidopoma simpsoni (J. B. Henderson & Bartsch, 1920)
- Rhytidopoma torreianum (Arango, 1878)
- Rhytidopoma trinidadense (de la Torre & Bartsch, 1941)
- Rhytidopoma violaceum Jaume & Sánchez de Fuentes, 1944
- Rhytidopoma wrightianum (Gundlach in Arango, 1881)
