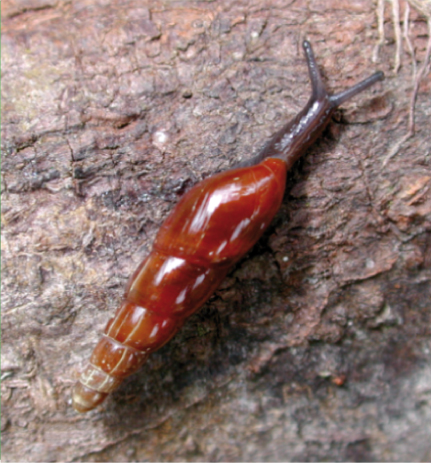
- A live individual of Laevaricella perlucens

Scientific classification
- Kingdom: Animalia
- Phylum: Mollusca
- Class: Gastropoda
- Order: Stylommatophora
- Superfamily: Oleacinoidea
- Family: Oleacinidae; H. Adams & A. Adams, 1855

Genera
- See text

= Oleacinidae =

Family of gastropods

Oleacinidae is a taxonomic family of air-breathing land snails, terrestrial pulmonate gastropod mollusks in the clade Eupulmonata (according to the taxonomy of the Gastropoda by Bouchet & Rocroi, 2005).

== Anatomy ==
In this family, the number of haploid chromosomes lies between 26 and 30 (according to the values in this table).

== Taxonomy ==
=== 2005 taxonomy ===
The family Oleacinidae is classified within the informal group Sigmurethra, itself belonging to the clade Stylommatophora within the clade Eupulmonata (according to the taxonomy of the Gastropoda by Bouchet & Rocroi, 2005).

The family Oleacinidae consists of the following subfamilies (according to the taxonomy of the Gastropoda by Bouchet & Rocroi, 2005):

- Oleacininae H. Adams & A. Adams, 1855 - synonyms: Polyphemidae Gistel, 1868 (inv.); Glandinidae Bourguignat, 1877; Streptostylini H. B. Baker, 1941
- Euglandininae H. B. Baker, 1941
- Varicellinae H. B. Baker, 1941

=== 2010 taxonomy ===
Thompson (2010) have redefined subfamilies in Spiraxidae and have moved Euglandininae and Streptostylinae as subfamilies of Spiraxidae.

== Genera ==
Genera in the family Oleacinidae include:

subfamily Oleacininae

- Oleacina Röding, 1798 - type genus of the family Oleacinidae
- Palaeoglandina Wenz, 1914
- Pseudoleacina Wenz, 1914

subfamily Varicellinae

- Varicella L. Pfeiffer, 1854 - type genus of the subfamily Varicellinae
- Glandinella L. Pfeiffer, 1878
- Laevaricella Pilsbry, 1907
- Melaniella L. Pfeiffer, 1857
- Sigmataxis Pilsbry, 1907
