= Ramsdenia =

Scientific classification
- Kingdom: Animalia
- Phylum: Mollusca
- Class: Gastropoda
- Subclass: Caenogastropoda
- Order: Littorinimorpha
- Family: Pomatiidae
- Genus: Ramsdenia; Preston, 1913

Synonyms
- List: Choanopoma (Ramsdenia) Preston, 1913 (original combination); Eutudora (Eutudorops) Henderson & Bartsch, 1920 (junior synonym); Eutudorex de la Torre & Bartsch, 1941 (junior synonym); Eutudorops Henderson & Bartsch, 1920; Jaumeia Aguayo, 1943; Limadora de la Torre & Bartsch, 1941 (junior synonym); Limadorex de la Torre & Bartsch, 1941 (junior synonym); Tudora (Eutudorex) de la Torre & Bartsch, 1941 (junior synonym); Tudora (Ramsdenia) Preston, 1913 (chresonym); Tudora (Wrightudora) de la Torre & Bartsch, 1941 (junior synonym); Wrightudora de la Torre & Bartsch, 1941 (junior synonym)

Genus of gastropods

Ramsdenia is a genus of land snails with an operculum, terrestrial gastropod mollusks in the family Pomatiidae.

== Species ==
The following species are recognised in the genus Ramsdenia:

- Ramsdenia arcticoronata (de la Torre & Bartsch, 1941)
- Ramsdenia auriculata (Aguayo, 1944)
- Ramsdenia azucarensis (J. B. Henderson & Bartsch, 1920)
- Ramsdenia banensis (Aguayo, 1944)
- Ramsdenia bufo (L. Pfeiffer, 1864)
- Ramsdenia complanata (de la Torre & Bartsch, 1941)
- Ramsdenia enodis (Gundlach, 1861)
- Ramsdenia garciana Aguayo, 1932
- Ramsdenia garridoiana (L. Pfeiffer & Gundlach, 1860)
- Ramsdenia gibarana (Aguayo, 1943)
- Ramsdenia gundlachi (de la Torre & Bartsch, 1941)
- Ramsdenia limonensis (de la Torre & Bartsch, 1941)
- Ramsdenia natensoni (de la Torre & Bartsch, 1941)
- Ramsdenia nobilitata (Poey, 1858)
- Ramsdenia notata (de la Torre & Bartsch, 1941)
- Ramsdenia perspectiva (L. Pfeiffer, 1859)
- Ramsdenia pulverulenta (L. Pfeiffer, 1864)
- Ramsdenia rocai (de la Torre & Bartsch, 1941)
- Ramsdenia rotundata (Poey, 1854)
- Ramsdenia scabrata (de la Torre & Bartsch, 1941)
- Ramsdenia semicoronata (L. Pfeiffer & Gundlach, 1860)
- Ramsdenia tollini (Ramsden, 1915)
- Ramsdenia torquata (Poey, 1858)
- Ramsdenia troscheli (L. Pfeiffer, 1864)
- Ramsdenia undosa (L. Pfeiffer, 1863)
- Ramsdenia welchi (de la Torre & Bartsch, 1941)
