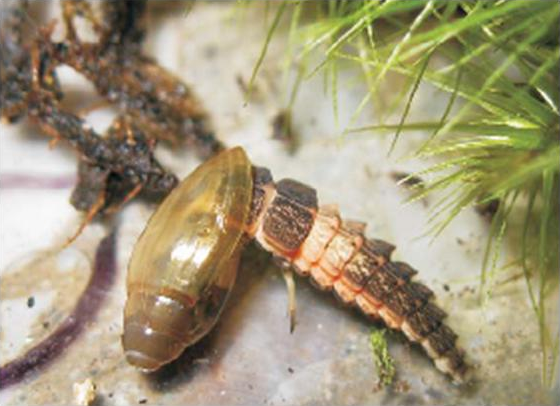
- A firefly larva Alecton discoidalis feeding on Oleacina sp.

Scientific classification
- Kingdom: Animalia
- Phylum: Mollusca
- Class: Gastropoda
- Order: Stylommatophora
- Family: Oleacinidae
- Genus: Oleacina; Röding, 1798

= Oleacina =

Genus of gastropods

Oleacina is a genus of air-breathing land snails, terrestrial pulmonate gastropod mollusks in the family Oleacinidae.

Oleacina is the type genus of the family Oleacinidae.

== Ecology ==
Predators of Oleacina include larvae of the firefly bug Alecton discoidalis in Cuba.
