= Maladera solida =

Scientific classification
- Kingdom: Animalia
- Phylum: Arthropoda
- Class: Insecta
- Order: Coleoptera
- Suborder: Polyphaga
- Infraorder: Scarabaeiformia
- Family: Scarabaeidae
- Genus: Maladera
- Species: M. solida

Binomial name
- Maladera solida (Brenske, 1899)

Synonyms
- Autoserica solida Brenske, 1899

Species of beetle

Maladera solida is a species of beetle of the family Scarabaeidae. It is found in Thailand and Singapore.

== Description ==
Adults reach a length of about 9.5 mm. They are dull, brown and opalescent. The clypeus is broad, slightly rounded anteriorly, almost dull-punctate. The pronotum is straight anteriorly, uniformly rounded at the sides, the posterior angles distinctly rounded. The elytra are punctate in rows within the striae, alongside irregular, closely spaced, coarse punctures. The slightly raised intervals are less punctured. The convex pygidium is slightly rounded with a fine longitudinal line at the apex.
