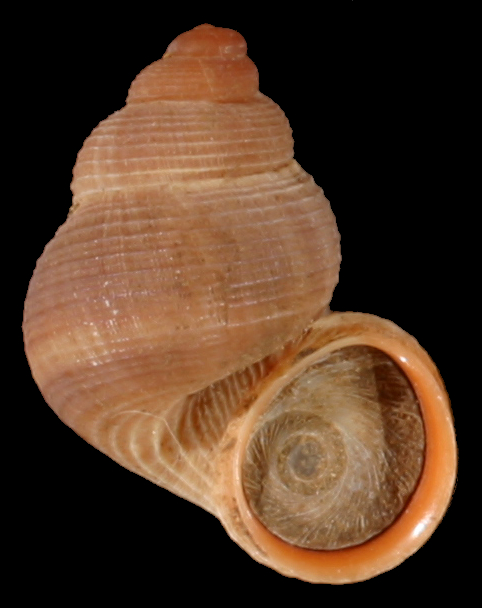
- Apertural view of a shell and an operculum of the land snail Tudorella sulcata in the family Pomatiidae
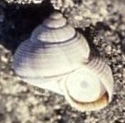
- The land snail Tropidophora fimbriata

Scientific classification
- Kingdom: Animalia
- Phylum: Mollusca
- Class: Gastropoda
- Subclass: Caenogastropoda
- Order: Littorinimorpha
- Superfamily: Littorinoidea; Children, 1834

Families
- See text

= Littorinoidea =

Superfamily of gastropods

Littorinoidea are a superfamily of both sea snails and land snails which have a gill and an operculum, terrestrial and marine gastropod mollusks in the order Littorinimorpha.

The terrestrial family within this group, the Pomatiidae, are sometimes called "land winkles" because the group originated in the sea and the closely related family Littorinidae are known as "winkles".

== Taxonomy ==
These families and subfamilies have been recognized in the taxonomy of Bouchet & Rocroi (2005):

- Littorinidae Children, 1834 - the periwinkles
  - Subfamily Littorininae Children, 1834
  - Subfamily Lacuninae Gray, 1857
  - Subfamily Laevilitorininae Reid, 1989
- † Bohaispiridae Youluo, 1978
- Pickworthiidae Iredale, 1917
  - Subfamily Pickworthiinae Iredale, 1917 (synonym: Reynellonidae Iredale, 1917)
  - Subfamily Pelycidiinae Ponder & Hall, 1983
  - Subfamily Sherborniinae Iredale, 1917
- Pomatiidae Newton, 1891 (1828)
  - Subfamily Pomatiinae Newton, 1891
- Annulariidae Henderson & Bartsch, 1920
  - Subfamily Annulariinae Henderson & Bartsch, 1920
  - Subfamily Rhytidopomatinae Henderson & Bartsch, 1920
  - Subfamily Tudorinae Watters, 2006
- † Purpurinidae Zittel, 1895
- Skeneopsidae Iredale, 1915
- † Tripartellidae Gründel, 2001
- Zerotulidae Warén & Hain, 1996

(Extinct taxa are indicated by a dagger, †.)

Families brought into synonymy

- Bembiciidae: synonym of Lacuninae
- Cyclostomatidae: synonym of Pomatiidae
- Ericiidae: synonym of Pomatiidae
- Faxiidae: synonym of Sherborniinae
- Lacunidae: synonym of Littorinidae
- Melarhaphidae: synonym of Littorininae
- Reynellonidae: synonym of Pickworthiinae
- Risellidae: synonym of Lacuninae
