= John Henderson Jr. =

American diplomat

John Brooks Henderson Jr.
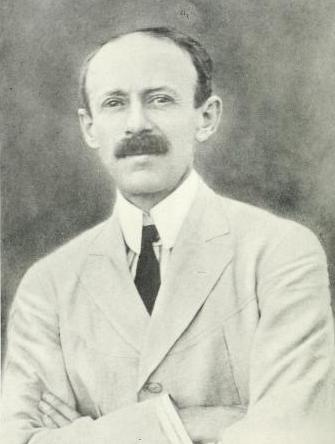
- Born: February 18, 1870; Pike County, Missouri, U.S.
- Died: January 4, 1923 (aged 52); Washington, D.C., U.S.
- Education: Harvard University; Columbian University
- Spouse: Angelica Schuyler Crosby (m. 1903; died 1907)
- Children: 1 adopted
- Parents: Mary Foote Henderson; John Brooks Henderson
- Relatives: Eunice Newton (grandmother); Elisha Foote (grandfather); Augusta Foote Arnold (aunt); Samuel A. Foot (great uncle)

John Brooks Henderson Jr. (February 18, 1870 – January 4, 1923) was an American diplomat, educator, and malacologist.

== Early life ==
Henderson was born in Pike County, Missouri on February 18, 1870. He was the son of United States Senator John Brooks Henderson and social activist Mary Foote Henderson, who was known as "The Empress of Sixteenth Street." His father was known as the Senator who introduced the thirteenth amendment to the Constitution that abolished slavery and one of seven Republicans who voted for acquittal during the impeachment trial of President Andrew Johnson in May 1868.

His maternal grandparents were Eunice (née Newton) Foote, a scientist and women's rights campaigner, and Elisha Foote, a prominent lawyer and judge. His grandfather Elisha was the brother of prominent politician Samuel Foote, who served as a member of the Connecticut House of Representatives, U.S. Representative, U.S. Senator, and Governor of Connecticut in the early 1800s.

Henderson graduated from Harvard University in 1891 and received his degree in law from Columbian University (now George Washington University) in 1893.

== Career ==
From 1896 to 1897, he was Private Secretary to the John W. Foster while Foster was diplomatic advisor to the Chinese government. In 1897, he traveled with General Nelson A. Miles to Europe and toured the Ottoman Empire as an unofficial observer.

In 1911, Henderson was appointed a citizen member of the Smithsonian Institution Board of Regents, serving until his death in 1923. He collected shells as a youth, later focusing on the marine shell life of the West Indies. He was involved with multiple expeditions to the Caribbean and he later donated his collection to the United States National Museum. He wrote several articles for the Proceedings of the United States National Museum and Bulletin of the United States National Museum.

In 1901, he was the author of American Diplomatic Questions, and The Cruise of the Tomas Barrera, in 1916, based on his expedition to Cuba in 1914.

== Personal life ==
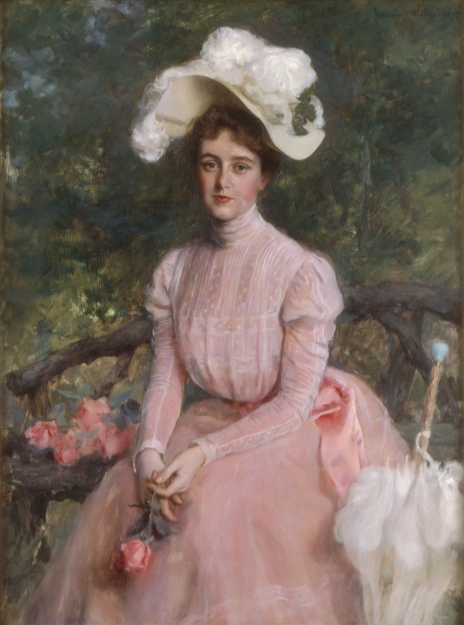
Angelica Schuyler Crosby Henderson, portrait by William Thorne

In 1903, he married Angelica Schuyler Crosby of New York in Jefferson County, West Virginia. She was the daughter of Harriet (née Van Rensselaer) Crosby and John Schuyler Crosby, the 5th Governor of the Montana Territory, and the paternal granddaughter of Clarkson F. Crosby and Angelica (née Schuyler) Crosby (a relative of U.S. Senator and noted Revolutionary War General Philip Schuyler), and the great-great-granddaughter of William Floyd, a signer of the United States Declaration of Independence. Through her mother, she was the granddaughter of General Stephen Van Rensselaer IV, who was the last patroon of Rensselaerwyck and the son of Stephen Van Rensselaer III. Together, they were the adoptive parents of Beatrice Van Rensselaer Henderson (1906–1992), who was married to Joseph Wholean (1894–1971) in 1926.

Henderson died in Washington, D.C., on January 4, 1923.

=== Legacy ===
Henderson is commemorated in the scientific name of a species of lizard, Anolis hendersoni, which is native to the West Indies.

== Publications ==
- American Diplomatic Questions, 1901, McMillan Company. New York.
- Cruise of the Tomas Barrera, 1916, G.P. Putnam's Sons, New York.
