= Karl Wilhelm von Dalla Torre =

Austrian botanist and entomologist (1850–1928)

Karl Wilhelm von Dalla Torre (14 July 1850 – 6 April 1928) was an Austrian taxonomist, entomologist and botanist.

Dalla Torre was born in Kitzbühel, Tyrol. He studied natural sciences at the University of Innsbruck. He then worked in the University as an entomologist and in 1895 became professor of zoology at the University of Innsbruck. He died in Innsbruck, aged 77.

== Works ==
Partial List

- Catalogus hymenopterorum hucusque descriptorum systematicus et synonymicus. vol. 1-10. Leipzig 1894-
- with Anton Hartinger [Ill.] Atlas der Alpenflora. Wien: Verl. d. Dt. u. Österr. Alpenvereins, 1882-1884
- Die Alpenpflanzen im Wissensschatz der deutschen Alpenbewohner (1905)
- with Ludwig von Sarnthein Flora der gefürsteten Grafschaft Tirol, des Landes Vorarlberg und des Fürstentums Liechtenstein, (1900-1913).
- with Heinrich von Ficker Klimatographie von Tirol und Vorarlberg. Wien: Gerold, 1909.
- Genera Siphonogamarum

For other Catalogues of Lepidoptera, Coleoptera and Hymenoptera and other works see Links
