= Richard Allen =

Richard, Rick, or Dick Allen may refer to:

== Artists ==
- Dick Allen (poet) (1939–2017), American poet, literary critic and academic
- Richard Allen (abstract artist) (1933–1999), British painter
- James Moffat (author) (1922–1993), Canadian-British novelist, wrote as Richard Allen, among other pseudonyms
- Richard J. Allen (writer) (born 1959), American television writer
- Richard James Allen (born 1960), Australian poet, dancer and filmmaker

== Sportspeople ==
- Dick Allen (1942–2020), American baseball player
- Dick Allen (footballer) (1921–1977), Australian footballer for Collingwood
- Dick Allen (bowler) (born 1978), American ten-pin bowler
- Richard Allen (field hockey) (1902–1969), Indian field hockey player
- Rick Allen (mountaineer), (1954–2021), Scottish climber

== Musicians ==
- Dickie Allen (born 1993), American musician, vocalist for bands Nekrogoblikon and Infant Annihilator
- Richard "Pistol" Allen (1932–2002), American musician, drummer for the Funk Brothers on Motown Records
- Rick Allen (drummer) (born 1963), British musician with the rock band Def Leppard
- Rick Allen (keyboardist) (born 1946), American musician with The Box Tops
- Rick Allen (organist) (born 1940s), American blues, rock and R&B organist and pianist
- Richard Allen (born 1963), American musician, conductor, composer, performer
- Richie Allen, a name used for recordings in the 1960s by Richard Podolor (1936–2022), American guitarist and record producer

== Politicians ==
- R. G. Allen (1833–1886), California and Idaho Territory legislator
- Richard Allen (Canadian politician) (1929–2019), historian and politician in Ontario, Canada
- Richard Allen (Irish politician) (died 1800), member of parliament for Harristown
- Richard Allen (Texas politician) (1830–1909), Texas politician and civic leader
- Richard V. Allen (1936–2024), American National Security Advisor under President Ronald Reagan
- Rick Allen (politician) (born 1951), American politician from the U.S. state of Georgia
- Richard D. Allen (1938–2009), member of the Michigan House of Representatives
- Richard J. Allen (politician) (1933–2021), member of both houses of the Michigan Legislature

== Other ==
- Dick Allen (film editor) (1944–2007), English film editor
- Richard Allen (abolitionist) (1803–1886), draper, philanthropist and abolitionist in Dublin
- Richard Allen (bishop) (1760–1831), African-American bishop, founder of AME Church
- Richard L. Allen (1803–1869), United States agricultural writer
- Richard Allen (publisher) (1814–1884), publisher in Nottingham
- Richard William Allen (1867–1955), English mechanical engineer
- Rick Allen (sportscaster) (born 1969), American motorsports announcer
- Richard K. Allen (born c. 1974), Anchorage district attorney
- Richard Knapp Allen (1925–1992), American entomologist and marine zoologist
- Richard Allen (film scholar) (born 1959), American film scholar
- Richard Allen (diplomat) (1903–1996), British diplomat
- Richard Hinckley Allen (1838–1908), American amateur astronomer, naturalist, and writer

== See also ==
- Richard Allan, Baron Allan of Hallam (born 1966), British politician
- Richard Van Allan (1935–2008), opera singer
- Dick Allan (born 1939), Scottish rugby union player
- Richie Allan (born 1975), Australian rugby league player
- Rick Allain (born 1969), North American ice hockey coach
- Murders of Abigail Williams and Liberty German, perpetrated by Indiana man Richard M. Allen
- Allan Dick (disambiguation)
