= Eunice Newton Foote =

American scientist and activist (1819–1888)

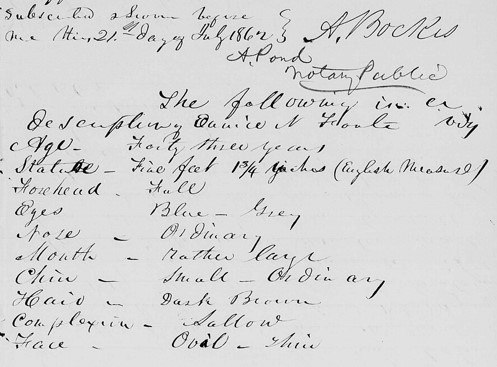
- Passport description of Foote in 1862
- Born: Eunice Newton; July 17, 1819; Goshen, Connecticut, U.S.
- Died: September 30, 1888 (aged 69); Lenox, Massachusetts, U.S.
- Resting place: Green-Wood Cemetery, Brooklyn, New York City
- Education: Troy Female Seminary
- Known for: Discovery of the effect of carbon dioxide gas on atmospheric temperature
- Spouse: Elisha Foote (m. 1841; died 1883)
- Children: Mary; Augusta

Eunice Newton Foote (born Eunice Newton; July 17, 1819 – September 30, 1888) was an American scientist, inventor, and women's rights campaigner. She was the first scientist to identify the insulating effect of certain gases and to posit that therefore rising carbon dioxide (CO_{2}) levels could increase atmospheric temperature and affect climate, a phenomenon now referred to as the greenhouse effect. Born in Connecticut, Foote was raised in New York at the center of social and political movements of her day, such as the abolition of slavery, anti-alcohol activism, and women's rights. She attended the Troy Female Seminary and the Rensselaer School from age 17 to age 19, gaining a broad education in scientific theory and practice.

After marrying attorney Elisha Foote in 1841, Foote settled in Seneca Falls, New York. She was a signatory to the Declaration of Sentiments and one of the editors of the proceedings of the 1848 Seneca Falls Convention, the first gathering to treat women's rights as its sole focus. In 1856 she published a paper notable for demonstrating the absorption of heat by CO_{2} and water vapor and hypothesizing that changing amounts of CO_{2} in the atmosphere would alter the climate. It was the first known publication in a scientific journal by an American woman in the field of physics. She published a second paper in 1857, on static electricity in atmospheric gases. Although she was not a member of the American Association for the Advancement of Science (AAAS), both her papers were read at the organization's annual conferences—these were the only papers in the field of physics to be written by an American woman until 1889. She went on to patent several inventions.

Foote died in 1888 and for almost a hundred years her contributions were unknown, before being rediscovered by women academics in the twentieth century. In the twenty-first century, new interest in Foote arose when it was realized that her work predated discoveries made by John Tyndall, who had been recognized by scientists as the first person to experimentally show the mechanism of the greenhouse effect involving infrared radiation. Detailed examination of her work by modern scientists has confirmed that three years before Tyndall published his paper in 1859, Foote discovered that water vapor and CO_{2} absorb heat from sunlight. Furthermore, her view that variances in the atmospheric levels of water vapor and CO_{2} would result in climate change preceded Tyndall's 1861 publication by five years. Because of the limits of her experimental design, and possibly a lack of knowledge of infrared radiation, Foote did not examine or detect the absorption and emission of radiant energy within the thermal infrared range, which is the cause of the greenhouse effect. In 2022, the American Geophysical Union instituted The Eunice Newton Foote Medal for Earth-Life Science in her honor to recognize outstanding scientific research.

== Childhood and education ==
Eunice Newton was born July 17, 1819, in Goshen, Connecticut, to Thirza and Isaac Newton Jr. By 1820, the family had relocated to Ontario County in western New York. Her father was a farmer and entrepreneur in East Bloomfield, amassing wealth and losing it through speculation. Eunice was a distant relative of the scientist Isaac Newton. Eunice had six sisters and five brothers, although the oldest sister died at two years old. Her father died in 1835 and the fifth child, a daughter named Amanda, took it upon herself to rid the properties of debt and become sole owner to keep the family farm from being sold. (Note: Thirza, Newton's mother, died on April 15, 1849. Amanda remained at the farm until 1882. She fell down the stairs in an accident on November 17 and died three days later.) The area of New York where Eunice grew up and spent most of her life was the era's center of social activism. She would have been exposed to abolitionists, dress reform activists, mystics, temperance advocates, and women's rights campaigners.

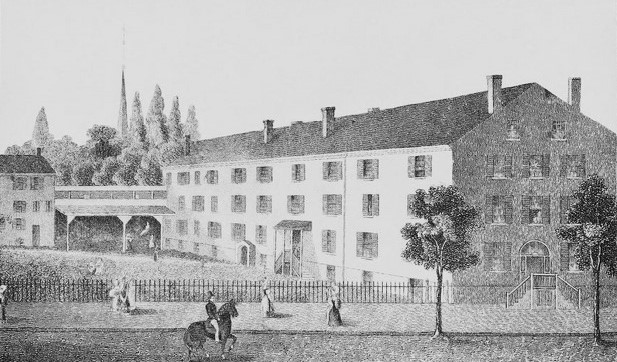
Troy Female Seminary, 1822

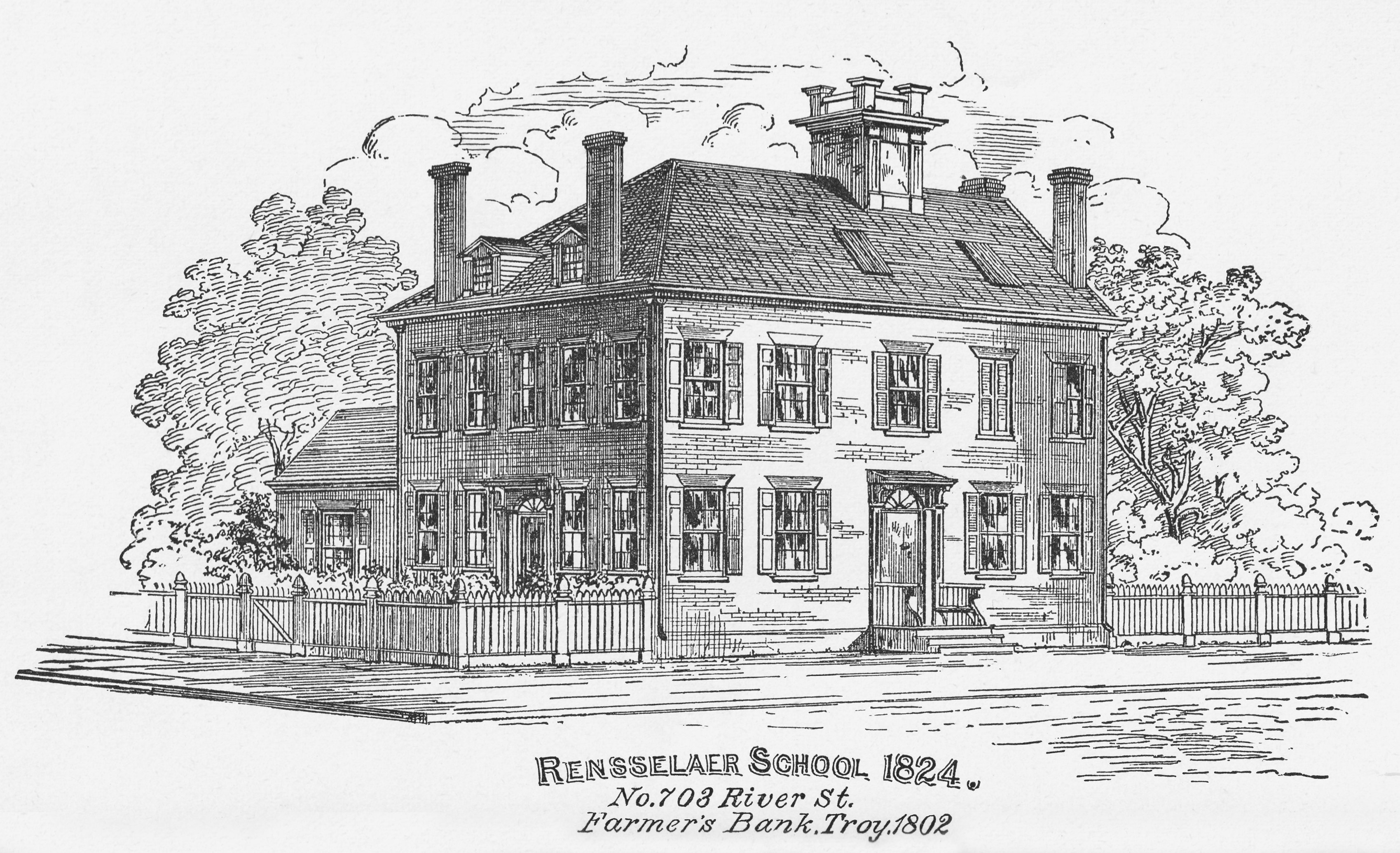
Rensselaer School, 1824

Newton was educated at the Troy Female Seminary, a pioneering women's preparatory school, (Note: Among other students of the Troy Female Seminary was future women's right activist Elizabeth Cady, (later Stanton), who attended in 1830. Cady's sister Margaret attended the school between 1834 and 1836, and another sister Catharine attended between 1835 and 1837. The fifty-year memorial publication Emma Willard and her Pupils or Fifty Years of Troy Female Seminary 1822–1872 (1898) does not mention Newton, but the introduction explains that a committee divided some 7,000 students into geographic regions and committee members attempted to research the students. Inquiries were made of living pupils, family members, friends, and officials who might have information on known students. Biographies included in the work were culled from personal correspondence received from the queries of committee members. The introduction also notes that records of graduates prior to 1843 were sporadically kept, as diplomas were not granted until that year. At the time of the publication in 1898, Foote had been dead for a decade.) established by feminist Emma Willard. Students of the seminary were encouraged to attend science courses at the adjacent Rensselaer School, which was led by Amos Eaton, the senior professor and a proponent of women's education. Eaton's innovative methods included lectures in scientific theory accompanied by practical experimentation in the laboratory, rather than rote memorization. Newton attended these schools between 1836 and 1838.

During Newton's attendance, the assistant principal of the seminary was Willard's sister Almira Hart Lincoln Phelps, who prepared the school's curricula and wrote textbooks for the students. (Note: Phelps was a pioneer of women in science and a botany expert, who was the fourth woman to become a member of the American Association for the Advancement of Science (AAAS).) Students were allowed to challenge their marks prior to the weekly meeting evaluating their moral gaps. Rather than the typical finishing school curricula offered to girls, pupils studied dance, history, languages (English, French, Italian, Latin), literature, mathematics (general, algebra, geometry), music, painting, philosophy, rhetoric, and science (botany, domestic science). At the Rensselaer School, Newton learned how to conduct research as well as laboratory testing. Girls attending the school could study astronomy, chemistry, geography, meteorology, and natural philosophy.

== Marriage and family life ==
On August 12, 1841, in East Bloomfield, Newton married Elisha Foote Jr. (1809–1883), a lawyer. Foote had trained in Johnstown, New York, under Judge Daniel Cady, the father of women's rights activist Elizabeth Cady Stanton. (Note: Elizabeth's husband, Henry Stanton, also trained in law with her father from 1840 to 1843, when he passed the bar examination.) In 1844, in a sheriff's sale, Elisha bought the house that the Stanton family moved into in 1847. He deeded it the following year to Daniel Cady, who in turn gave it to his daughter, Elizabeth in 1846. Writer Ermina Leonard described Eunice as "a fine portrait and landscape painter", who was also known as an amateur scientist and an inventor. On her 1862 passport application, the officials described Foote as being just under 5 ft 2 in (1.57 m) tall, with blue-gray eyes, a "rather large" mouth, with an oval face, a sallow complexion, and dark brown hair.

The marriage produced two daughters, Mary, born July 21, 1842, who became an artist, writer and women's rights advocate; and Augusta, born October 24, 1844, who became a writer. Both daughters were born in Seneca Falls. Elisha became a judge who worked at the Court of Common Pleas in Seneca County, but he resigned from his post in 1846. He continued working as a lawyer and Eunice designed and built a laboratory in their home. By the spring of 1860, the family had relocated to Saratoga Springs, New York, where Augusta was privately schooled. Elisha ran a private practice and was a specialist in patent law.

In 1865, Elisha was appointed to serve an apprenticeship on the Board of Examiners-in-Chief for the United States Patent and Trademark Office. The entire family relocated at that time to Washington, D.C. While they were in Washington, both daughters married. Mary wed John B. Henderson, a US Senator from Missouri, a co-author of the 13th Amendment to abolish slavery and an advocate for the 15th Amendment to grant voting rights to former slaves. They had a lavish ceremony in 1868, attended by many dignitaries, including US President Andrew Johnson. The following year, Augusta married Francis Benjamin Arnold, a coffee importer from New York City.

After completing his apprenticeship, Elisha was appointed the Commissioner of Patents, serving from July 25, 1868, through April 25, 1869. When his term as commissioner expired, he remained on the Board of Examiners-in-Chief for several years. The couple were living in East Bloomfield in 1872 and 1873, were back in Washington in 1874, but had returned to New York by 1878. They were living in New York City in 1881. While visiting in St. Louis, Missouri, in 1883, Elisha died at Mary's home. After Elisha's death, Eunice lived partly in Brooklyn and partly in Lenox, Massachusetts.

== Campaigner for women's rights ==
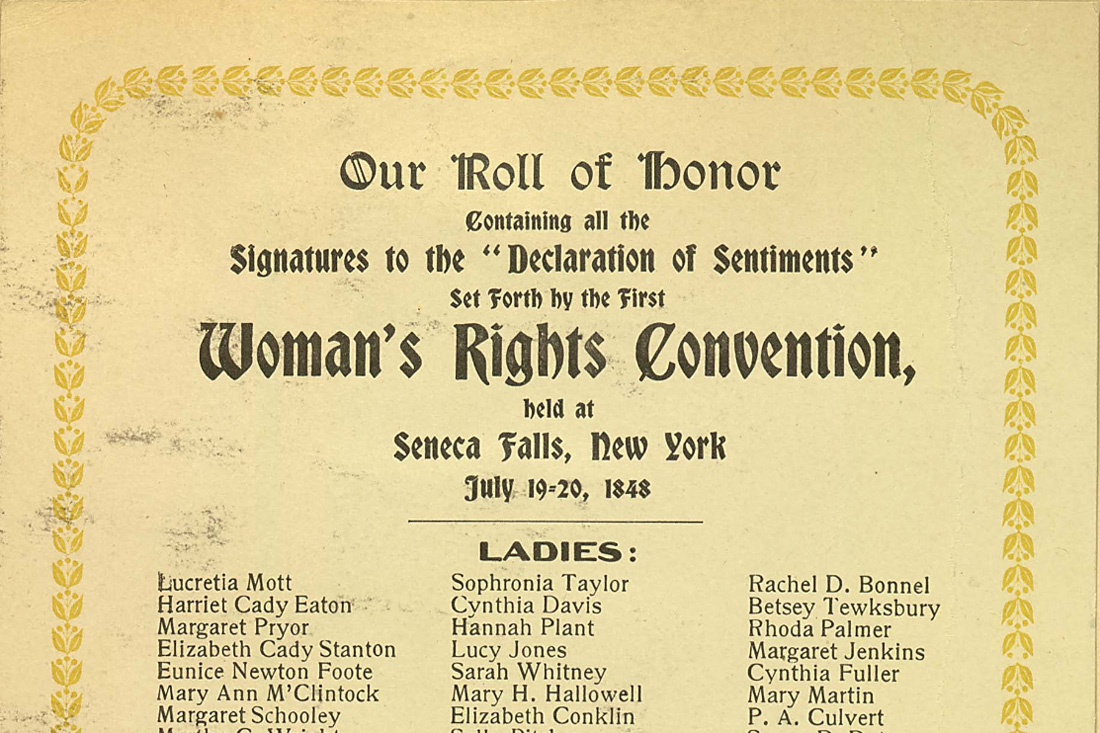
The signature page of the Declaration of Sentiments, bearing Foote's signature on the left

Eunice Foote was a neighbor and friend of suffragist Elizabeth Cady Stanton and attended the 1848 Seneca Falls Convention, the first women's rights convention. As a member of the editorial committee for the convention, Foote and her husband Elisha were signatories of the convention's Declaration of Sentiments. The declaration, written by Stanton, demanded social and legal rights equal to those of men, as well as the right to vote. Foote was one of the five women who prepared the proceedings of the convention for publication; the others were Stanton, Elizabeth M'Clintock, Mary Ann M'Clintock, and Amy Post.

== Scientific career ==
=== "Circumstances Affecting the Heat of the Sun's Rays" ===
An amateur scientist, Foote conducted a series of experiments that demonstrated the interactions of sunlight on different gases. She used an air pump, two glass cylinders, and four mercury-in-glass thermometers. In each cylinder, she placed two thermometers and then used the pump to evacuate the air from one cylinder and compress it in the other cylinder. When both cylinders reached equal ambient temperatures, they were placed in the sunlight and temperature variances were measured. She also placed the containers in the shade for comparison and tested the temperature results by dehydrating one cylinder and adding water to the other, to measure the effect of dry versus moist air. Foote noted that the amount of moisture in the air impacted the temperature results. She performed this experiment on air, carbon dioxide (CO_{2}) (which was called carbonic acid gas in her era), and hydrogen, finding that the tube filled with carbon dioxide became hotter than the others when exposed to sunlight. She wrote: "The receiver containing this gas became itself much heated—very sensibly more so than the other—and on being removed [from the Sun], it was many times as long in cooling".

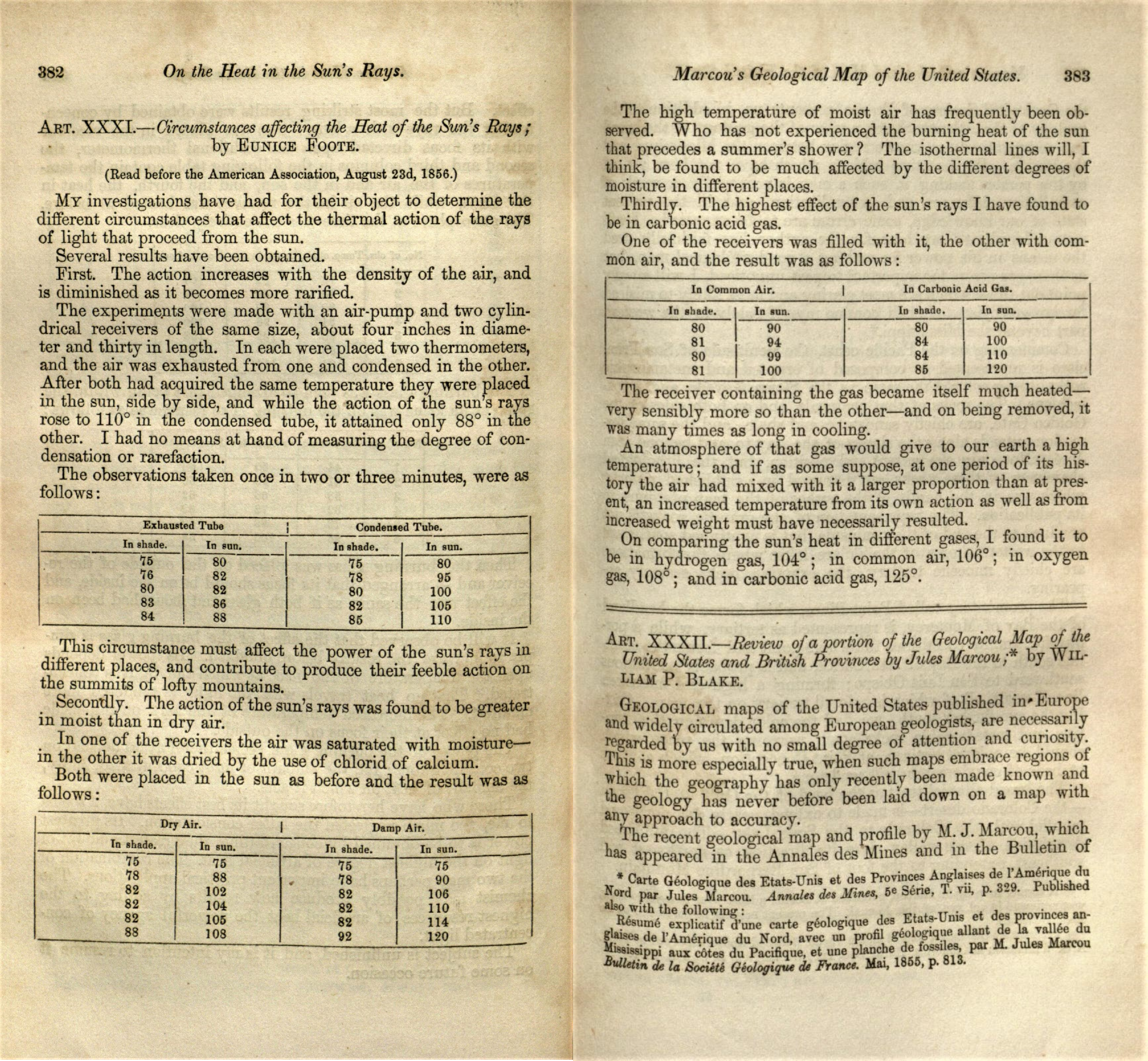
Eunice Foote – "Circumstances Affecting the Heat of the Sun's Rays" (1856), American Journal of Science and Arts. Foote recognized the implications of carbon dioxide's heat-capturing properties—the greenhouse effect—for the entire planet.

Foote noted that CO_{2} reached a temperature of 125 °F (52 °C) and that the amount of moisture in the air contributed to temperature variances. In connection with the history of the Earth, Foote theorized that "An atmosphere of that gas would give to our earth a high temperature; and if, as some suppose, at one period of its history, the air had mixed with it a larger proportion than at present, an increased temperature from its own action, as well as from increased weight, must have necessarily resulted." Her theory was a clear statement of climatic warming caused by increased levels of CO_{2} in the atmosphere.

Foote described her findings in a paper, "Circumstances Affecting the Heat of the Sun's Rays", that she submitted for the tenth annual AAAS meeting, held on August 23, 1856, in Albany, New York. For reasons that are unclear, Foote did not read her paper to those present—even the few women who became members seldom presented their work at the conference (Note: Norma Rosado-Blake, an archivist for the AAAS, noted that Foote's work was likely presented because Elisha was a member of the association. Historian Margaret Rossiter recognized that although the AAAS allowed women to be members from 1850, they could not be given the titles of "professional" or "fellow", as those were reserved for men. Katharine Wilkinson, climate activist and writer, acknowledged in 2019 that social norms may have played a part in Foote not presenting her own paper, and Washington Post journalist Gillian Brockell wrote in 2021 that perhaps Henry presented the work so that male scientists would take it seriously.)—and her paper was instead presented by Joseph Henry of the Smithsonian Institution. Henry introduced Foote's paper by stating "Science was of no country and of no sex. The sphere of woman embraces not only the beautiful and the useful, but the true". Yet, he discounted her findings in the New-York Daily Tribune article about the presentation, saying "although the experiments were interesting and valuable, there were [many] [difficulties] encompassing [any] attempt to interpret their significance".

The 1856 edition of the American Journal of Science and Arts published Foote's complete paper under her given name, immediately following a paper by her husband, Elisha. Other than those on astronomy, the paper was the first known physics publication in a scientific journal by an American woman. It was not however included by the AAAS in their annual publication of the association's meetings. Summaries of Foote's work were included in the 1857 edition of The Annual of Scientific Discovery, the Canadian Journal of Industry, Science and Art (1857), the Jahresbericht über die Fortschritte der reinen, pharmaceutischen und technischen Chemie, Physik, Mineralogie und Geologie, 1856 (Annual Report on the Progress of Pure, Pharmaceutical, and Industrial Chemistry, Physics, Mineralogy, and Geology, 1856 (Giessen, 1857), the Edinburgh New Philosophical Journal (1857), the newspaper New-York Daily Tribune, and the magazine Scientific American (1856). Both the Giessen and Edinburgh summaries omitted her direct conclusions about the impact of carbon dioxide on climate. The summary written in the Edinburgh New Philosophical Journal indicated that two papers had been written, one by Elisha and one by Mrs. Elisha Foote, but the title of Elisha's paper, "On the Heat in the Sun's Rays", was given for both articles, although the summary was entirely devoted to Eunice's paper. Foote was praised in the September 13, 1856, issue of Scientific American. Although the article was titled "Scientific Ladies—Experiments with Condensed Gases", Foote was the primary subject. Impressed that her theories were backed up by experiments, the authors stated, "This we are happy to say has been done by a lady", and noted that "she was deeply acquainted with almost every branch of physical science".

In the late 1770s, Horace Bénédict de Saussure had used a similar apparatus to Foote's and concluded that altitude impacted solar heat in an enclosed cylinder. Joseph Fourier had theorized in the 1820s that atmospheric gases trapped solar heat. Neither of them had recognized the increase in solar heat by CO_{2} and water vapor in the atmosphere, which was unique to Foote's findings. In 1859, John Tyndall reported his more sophisticated research, using a Leslie cube and a differential spectrometer, showing that several gases both trapped and emitted infrared thermal radiation rather than sunlight. His work, "Note on the Transmission of Radiant Heat through Gaseous Bodies" was published that year in the Proceedings of the Royal Society, of which he was a fellow.

Tyndall gave credit to Claude Pouillet's work on solar radiation through the atmosphere, but appeared to be unaware of Foote's work, or did not think it was relevant. Tyndall made no mention of water vapor, carbon dioxide, or climate until his fourth publication on the topic which appeared in the French-language journal Bibliothèque Universelle de Genève in 1859, and even there, did not make a connection with climate change. After conducting further tests, in 1861 his seminal work on climate, "The Bakerian Lecture: On the Absorption and Radiation of Heat by Gases and Vapours, and on the Physical Connexion of Radiation, Absorption, and Conduction" was presented as a lecture to the Royal Society. It was published later that year in the Philosophical Transactions of the Royal Society.

=== "On a New Source of Electrical Excitation" ===
By 1857, Foote was conducting experiments on static electricity, which she called "electrical excitation". The studies were designed to test the moisture content and which gases in the air could generate static electricity. She used an air pump with limited power to adjust the air pressure in a glass tube about two feet long and three inches in diameter and sealed at the ends with brass caps. Attached to one cap was a gold leaf electrometer, which allowed her to measure electrical charges and the other cap was attached to the pump. Vacuuming out the atmospheric air, she replaced it with oxygen, hydrogen, and CO_{2}, as well as dry and damp air to test their effect upon the electrical charge. By expanding or compressing air, Foote noted that the moisture content was changed, which in turn affected the amount of static electricity that could be generated. She was working from a hypothesis that electric charges and fluctuations in atmospheric pressure might explain the Earth's magnetic field and polarity, which was later shown by other scientists not to be the case.

Foote's paper, "On a New Source of Electrical Excitation", was again read by Henry at the annual AAAS conference held in Montreal, on the third day of proceedings, August 14, 1857. In November 1857, her findings were published in the Proceedings of the American Association for the Advancement of Science. The publication of this paper was the first time an American woman's work in physics had been included in the journal. During the nineteenth century, only sixteen physics papers were published by American women. The only two published before 1889 were Foote's 1856 and 1857 papers.

Foote's paper was abbreviated and published in the American Journal of Science and Arts and the Philosophical Magazine. The Philosophical Magazine had rejected publication of her first paper in favor of reprinting Elisha's 1856 work. The article about Foote's findings published in The New-York Daily Times on August 18, 1857, (Note: Ortiz and Jackson erroneously give the date as August 8, 1857.) praised her work, claiming that her findings had been "never heretofore proven", although in fact, they confirmed the ideal gas law, published in 1834. She proved that adiabatic heating or cooling, or changes in temperature that occur without the addition or removal of heat, is the result of changing pressure. Temperature changes alter the vapor pressure in the air, which in turn, impacts the generation of static electricity.

=== Inventions ===
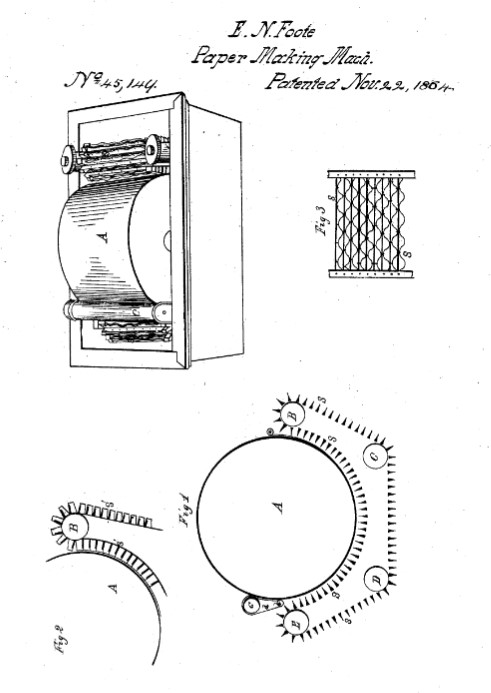
Foote's paper-making machine, 1864

Eunice Foote and her husband Elisha were both inventors. Rachel Brazil, a science writer for Chemistry World, noted in 2020 that Elisha filed a patent in 1842 on a thermostatically controlled cooking stove which had been invented by Eunice. According to Brazil, Eunice mostly patented her inventions in her husband's name, because as a married woman, she would not have been able to defend the patents in court. Foote herself acknowledged the practice in 1868, when Stanton visited her at the patent office. She told Stanton that in her opinion half of the patents filed were on inventions by women but because men controlled the money needed to make a model and sought the prestige, they took women's patents out in their own names. In 1857, Elisha was awarded a substantial settlement for infringement on the 1842 stove patent.

Eunice filed a patent in her own name in 1860 on a shoe and boot insert made of a single piece of vulcanized rubber to "prevent the squeaking of boots and shoes". A skate that she invented, which did not have straps, was reported in The Emporia News in 1868. (Note: Elisha filed a patent on a skate attached to the boot with screws in 1864.) In 1864, Eunice developed a new cylinder-type of paper-making machine. The Daily Evening Star reported that the machine allowed better quality wrapping and printing paper to be manufactured at less cost. A company from Fitchburg, Massachusetts, which used the machine reported that it saved them $157 (equivalent to $2,720 in 2021) per day in raw materials.

== Death ==
Foote died on September 29 or 30, 1888, in Lenox, Massachusetts. She was buried in Green-Wood Cemetery in Brooklyn, New York.

== Rediscovery ==
=== Background ===
Biases against crediting women scientists for their work led to a lack of documentation about her contributions and scientific achievements, and Foote fell into obscurity. Scientists and journalists generally agree that happened because she was a woman and an amateur scientist, and American scientists were then less respected than were Europeans. Her failure to name the specific works of the scientists that had influenced her marked Foote as an amateur. American researchers were recognized in her era for natural history, but physics was still a developing field, and few American physicists had an international reputation. Tyndall became the person most often credited with the discovery of the greenhouse effect. Some writers credit the greenhouse effect to Svante Arrhenius, the Swedish Nobel laureate in chemistry, who used physical chemistry to calculate how increases in the amount of atmospheric carbon dioxide can cause the Earth to warm and proved that human interaction with the environment was a direct cause of climate change.

In 1902, Susan B. Anthony made a speech calling on younger feminists to take up the reins from founders of the movement like "Elizabeth Cady Stanton, Lucretia Mott, Eunice Newton Foote, Mary Livermore, and Isabella Beecher Hooker." Institutionalized neglect of women's history and distortion of the historical record by historians who did not analyze or include women's experiences led to little being known about early feminists. Before 1960, only thirteen texts published in the United States dealt with women's history. Of those, five focused on colonial women, and three focused on Antebellum Southern women.

Women's liberation activists began making demands for the increased representation of women in academia in the late 1960s. They wanted research into women's history to be expanded and for groups such as people of color and other marginalized communities to be part of the historic record. In 1969, those activists formed the Coordinating Committee on Women in the Historical Profession as an affiliate of the American Historical Association, hoping to address historical omissions and eliminate discrimination and recruiting problems in the profession of historians. The push for the inclusion of women as both historical subjects and a field of study for academics resulted in the first university women's studies program being launched in the United States in 1970. The first texts specifically written about first-wave feminists were written after 1975.

=== Recovery ===
Women scholars began recovering Foote's role as a nineteenth-century scientist in the 1970s. In 1976, historian Sally Gregory Kohlstedt noted Foote's participation as the only woman at the 1857 meeting of the AAAS in her history of that organization. Kohlstedt also noted both Elisha's membership in the AAAS from 1856 to 1860, and Eunice's presentation of papers as a non-member. (Note: Ronald L. Numbers' review of the article singled out the fact that of the 2,200 members of the AAAS before 1860 only four were women and Eunice, who was a nonmember, was the only woman who had presented a paper.) Deborah Jean Warner mentioned Foote's articles, and her participation in the 1856 and 1857 AAAS conferences, in her article "Science Education for Women in Antebellum America" published in 1978 in the History of Science Society's international journal Isis. Lois Barber Arnold, who taught in the Science Education Department of the Teachers College, Columbia University, described Foote's experiments and participation in the AAAS conferences in detail in 1984, but noted that biographical data on her was lacking. (Note: Reviews of Arnold's work, noted its contribution to recovering the history of women scientists. None discussed her inclusion of Foote, nor assessed the value of any of the women's scientific contributions.) Elizabeth Wagner Reed, a geneticist and scholar who studied biases against women in science, included a chapter "Eunice Newton Foote: 1819–1888" in her 1992 book American Women in Science Before the Civil War.

After the advent of the Internet and digitization, renewed interest in Foote was sparked by an article published by retired petroleum geologist Ray Sorenson, in January 2011, in the American Association of Petroleum Geologists' on-line journal Search and Discovery. Katharine Hayhoe, director of the Climate Science Center at Texas Tech University, came across Foote's work when trying to answer a question by a colleague, Patricia Solís, about the lack of women in early climate research. She published an article "John v Eunice — A Fascinating Tale of Early Climate Science, Women's Rights and Accidental Poisoning" on Facebook in 2016. Leila McNeill, joint editor-in-chief of the magazine Lady Science, published an article in the Smithsonian magazine in December of that year, after discussing Foote with Sorenson. Around the same time, the physicist John Perlin, who according to Nick Welsh, the executive editor of the Santa Barbara Independent, is an author of two definitive histories on solar energy, took note of Foote and began to research her history. By 2019, and because it was the 200th anniversary of Foote's birth, both academics and journalists from many parts of the globe had begun to regularly write about Foote and the sexism and biases in the scientific community, which caused women, and particularly women scientists, to go unrecognized.

==== Evaluating Foote's experiments ====
Roland Jackson, a visiting scholar at the London-based Royal Institution, set out in 2019 to analyze the questions of priority of Foote's work, as had Hayhoe in 2016. According to Jackson and Hayhoe, Foote's simple apparatus could not distinguish between the effects of energy emitted from the sun and infrared energy radiated by the Earth. Because Tyndall had more sophisticated equipment, Hayhoe noted that he was able to make these distinctions and conclusively measure the "heat-trapping properties" of several gases, by differentiating their infrared energy and the ability of molecules to absorb or emit radiation. Jackson acknowledged that it was possible that Foote did not "recognize, the distinction between solar radiation and radiated heat from the earth". Ralph Lorenz evaluated Foote's work in a modern planetary climate context and noted that the near-infrared (0.8 to 3 μm) radiation absorption reported by Foote is effectively an antigreenhouse effect because it primarily involves solar radiation absorption rather than absorption and re-radiation of terrestrial longwave ('thermal') infrared radiation.

An analysis of both of Foote's papers was published online in 2020 by Joseph D. Ortiz, a geology professor at Kent State University, and Jackson. Their printed findings in 2022 contain a description of Foote's methodology. They pointed out that, although she did not cite specific works by other scientists, she referenced de Saussure, Alexander von Humboldt, and Edward Sabine. (Reed had previously noted that Foote had also referenced Henri Becquerel, Jean-Baptiste Biot, and Joseph Louis Gay-Lussac.) They also noted that Foote "did not measure the natural greenhouse effect of the earth's atmosphere", but rather studied the heating of gases inside glass vessels. The walls of these vessels would have blocked longwave infrared radiation from either entering or leaving, while allowing some heat to escape via conduction. Accordingly, her results did not directly indicate how the greenhouse effect operates in a natural atmosphere, but they did provide quantitative information about how gases, including greenhouse gases, absorb and radiate heat.

Ortiz and Jackson's analysis traced the derivation of Foote's ideas and explored how she constructed, carried out, and interpreted her experiments. They found that she conducted her experiments using a control and a test vessel, which were made as similarly as possible. Her experimental design repeated pairing so that she could measure changes between full sun and shadow, vacuumed and condensed air, damp and dry air, and ambient atmosphere and CO_{2} for each vessel. Although she did not attempt to answer how or why heating occurred, her results confirmed the questions she sought to answer: "Does the concentration of gas in the atmosphere affect its warming response to the Sun's rays?; Does the composition of the gas in the atmosphere affect its warming response to the Sun's rays?; and Can the effect of different gases on the warming response of the Sun's rays be ranked?"

==== Analysis of Foote's pioneering role in climate science ====
Reed's chapter gave biographical details on Eunice and her family and presented a detailed analysis of her scientific work. She recognized that Foote's experiments confirmed that when subjected to sunlight, carbon dioxide became warmer than air "thereby demonstrating what we call the greenhouse effect today". In 2010, when Sorenson came across a summary of Foote's work in an 1857 volume of The Annual of Scientific Discovery, he was unaware that the full paper had been published. He also did not know how much of what publisher David Ames Wells wrote in the summary was "attributable to [Foote]". Sorenson recognized that Foote's work had preceded Tyndall's in making the connection between carbon dioxide and climate change, but believed her lack of recognition for the discovery was that her work had merely been an oral presentation. He published an update to his initial findings on Foote in 2018, and reported "an examination of the American Journal of Science and Arts (AJS) was conducted, and the original paper [by Foote] was found in the November 1856 issue" ... "The published AJS paper clearly shows that the idea of climate warming due to rising levels of atmospheric CO_{2} originated with Eunice Foote."

Jackson's work in 2019 confirmed that Foote's experiments showing that water vapor and CO_{2} absorb heat occurred three years before Tyndall made a similar claim. He also validated that her observation that differences in atmospheric levels of water vapor and CO_{2} would result in climate change preceded Tyndall's claim by five years. Lorenz reported in 2019 in his work Exploring Planetary Climate that Foote had made her discoveries proving that moist air produced more warming than dry air, and that variances in air density impacted warming, prior to Tyndall. Perlin concurred, describing Foote as "the Rosa Parks of science, ... the first woman to have a paper read at a major scientific meeting ... first woman to have a paper published in the proceedings of a major scientific meeting ... [and] the only woman to be published in serious physics journals until Madame Curie". Ortiz and Jackson concluded that Foote was the first to demonstrate absorption of heat by carbon dioxide and water vapor, but she did not isolate or detect the absorption and emission of radiant energy within the thermal infrared range, which causes the greenhouse effect.

==== Debate on whether Tyndall knew of Foote's work ====
The rediscovery of Foote also sparked academic debate on whether Tyndall knew of her work. Hayhoe's position in 2018 was that there was inadequate information to make a determination. Perlin strongly believed that Tyndall did know, because one of his papers was published in the 1856 American Journal of Science along with Foote's. Jackson, who also wrote a biography of Tyndall, believes that Tyndall probably never knew of Foote. He acknowledges the possibility that Tyndall could have known, as he was one of the editors of the Philosophical Magazine and could have been involved in the selection of the articles it chose to publish. Jackson also notes that many European scientists, including George Stokes and William Thomson, were unaware of Foote's work since her name is not mentioned in any of the "correspondence, journals, or published papers of the critical physicists" of her era.

Perlin countered Jackson's view because, in an earlier incident, Tyndall had not credited precedent work by Henry and Tyndall was known to have little regard for women's intellectual capacity. Jeff Hecht, a science and technology writer, acknowledged that the reasons why Tyndall did not credit Foote remain unknown but that he "…might have ignored a discovery claimed by a woman". Like Perlin, Hecht pointed out that Tyndall "…failed to credit discoveries by men like Colladon, and quarreled over priority with some other prominent scientists of his time". Jackson rebutted that Tyndall had only limited interest in climate and after 1861, never published again on the subject as his interest was in studying the effect of radiation upon molecules. Jackson stated that it was scientists who gave Tyndall the title of "founder of climate science" and not a title that Tyndall had claimed for himself.

== Legacy and recognition ==
In May 2018, a symposium on Foote's work, Science Knows No Gender: In Search of Eunice Foote Who 162 Years Ago Discovered the Principal Cause of Global Warming was held at the University of California, Santa Barbara. The main presenter at the symposium, the first conference specifically organized to honor Foote, was Perlin. A short film about Foote's life, Eunice, was produced in 2018 by Eric Garro and Paul Bancilhon. That year, Cornell University Press released a textbook titled Communicating Climate Change: A Guide for Educators, confirming that Foote's work preceded that of Tyndall. The University of California, Santa Barbara Library opened a seven-month exhibit in November 2019, From Eunice Foote to UCSB: A Story of Women, Science, and Climate Change, to honor Foote's work and legacy.

Foote's work is now recognized as the earliest known scientific research to demonstrate the existence of greenhouse gases and their potential to effect changes in climate. The publication of her paper in the 1856 edition of the American Journal of Science and Arts is acknowledged as the first known publication in a scientific journal on physics by a woman. The publication of her 1857 paper in that year's Proceedings of the American Association for the Advancement of Science is acknowledged as the first time an American woman's work had been published in the journal. The American Geophysical Union instituted The Eunice Newton Foote Medal for Earth-Life Science in 2022 to recognize exceptional scientific achievements in research that focuses on the convergence of Earth and life science.

In 2025, the ichnotaxon Osspecus eunicefooteae, a fossilised worm burrow from the Cretaceous of the UK, was named in honour of Eunice Foote.

Poet Jessy Randall included a tribute to Foote in her 2025 collection of poems about women scientists, The Path of Most Resistance.

== Published works ==
- Foote, Eunice (September 1856). "Circumstances Affecting the Heat of the Sun's Rays". The American Journal of Science and Arts. 22 (66). New York, New York: G. P. Putnam & Company: 382–383. ISSN 0099-5363. OCLC 1280516952 – via archive.org.
- Foote, Eunice (August 1857). "On a New Source of Electrical Excitation". Proceedings of the American Association for the Advancement of Science: Eleventh Meeting. Cambridge, Massachusetts: Joseph Lovering: 123–126. OCLC 923936325.
- US patent 28265, Foote, Eunice N., "Filling for Soles of Boots and Shoes", published May 15, 1860
- US patent 45149, Foote, Eunice N., "Improvement in Paper-Making Machines", published November 22, 1864

== See also ==
- History of climate change science
- Matilda effect – a bias against acknowledging the achievements of women scientists
- Women in climate change
