= Almira Lincoln Phelps =

American educator, botanist, author, editor (1793–1884)

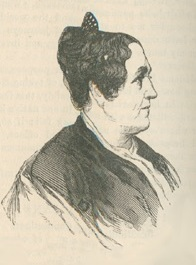
- Phelps by Sarah Josepha Hale, 1853
- Born: Almira Hart; July 15, 1793; Berlin, Connecticut, U.S.
- Died: July 15, 1884 (aged 91); Baltimore, Maryland, U.S.
- Other name: Almira Hart Lincoln
- Occupations: Educator; author; editor; scientist
- Years active: 1809–1884
- Known for: Nature writing; novels; essays; memoirs; textbooks; botany
- Spouses: Simeon Lincoln (m. 1817; died 1823) John Phelps (m. 1831)
- Children: 3, including Charles
- Relatives: Emma Hart Willard (sister)

Almira Lincoln Phelps (née Hart; July 15, 1793 – July 15, 1884) was an American scientist, educator, writer, and editor. Her botany writings influenced more early American women to be botanists, including Eunice Newton Foote and her daughter, Augusta Newton Foote Arnold. Though she primarily wrote about nature, she also wrote novels, essays, and memoirs. The standard author abbreviation A.Phelps is used to indicate this person as the author when citing a botanical name.

Phelps was a native of Connecticut. Her long and active life was devoted to the education of young women. She published several popular science textbooks in the fields of botany, chemistry, and geology. Some of her works worthy of special commemoration include, The Blue Ribbon Society; The School Girls Rebellion; Christian Households; Familiar Lectures on Botany; Our Country and its Relation to the Present, Past and Future; and The Fireside Friend. Her views on topics ranging from elocution to corsets are contained in Lectures to Young Ladies, Comprising Outlines and Applications of the Different Branches of Female Education for the User of Female Schools, and Private Libraries.

== Early life and education ==
Almira Hart was born on July 15, 1793, in Berlin, Connecticut, the youngest of 17 children, growing up in an intellectual, independently thinking, and religious environment. She and her family lived on a farm. Her mother, Lydia, took interest in anatomy, examining the animals she cooked and thereby developing a rudimentary knowledge of human anatomy. This afforded her the ability to reset dislocated joints and perform other basic first aid for her family and community, in cases where a doctor was not immediately available.

Lydia also studied the properties of plants, and she later discussed these observations with her daughter, Almira, after her interest in botany had begun. Lydia Hart taught her children the value of the world around them, and they learned to work hard on the farm. Through these lessons, Lydia also taught her daughters what she believed to be their place in the world, as women.

The Hart home was an open place where members of the community would often gather to debate a vast array of subjects. Almira's father, Samuel Hart, himself loved to argue and debate, and there was often a dissenter or a preacher in their home who had stopped by to argue with him. The Hart children were encouraged to question things and to create their own opinions on various matters. Almira and her family often gathered around the fireplace, where her father and mother would share tales of their ancestors and family anecdotes. Almira's favorite tales concerned the Revolutionary war.

Through her close friendship with the elderly mother of a bookseller, Almira had access to a vast array of books from an early age. She loved to read, and at first seemed to enjoy reading anything she could get her hands on. One of Almira's most influential mentors was her older sister, Emma Hart Willard. Emma would become an influential reformer of women's education, and advised her sister early on to choose good books with which to educate herself, instead of merely reading for the pastime of it. When Almira was 17, she went to live with Emma and her husband, as her sister was in charge of the female academy at Middlebury.

While living with her sister, she was also mentored by John Willard and three of his fellow students, who also came to live in the Willard household. She studied mathematics and philosophy. Young men from Middlebury College often boarded with the Willards, or in homes nearby, while they were attending college. This allowed Almira and other women like her the chance to gain a secondhand college education, engaging in discussions with the boarders and thereby learning subjects which were at that time not taught, or taught only basically, at the female academies. It was in this secondhand way that Almira learned higher mathematics.

== Career ==
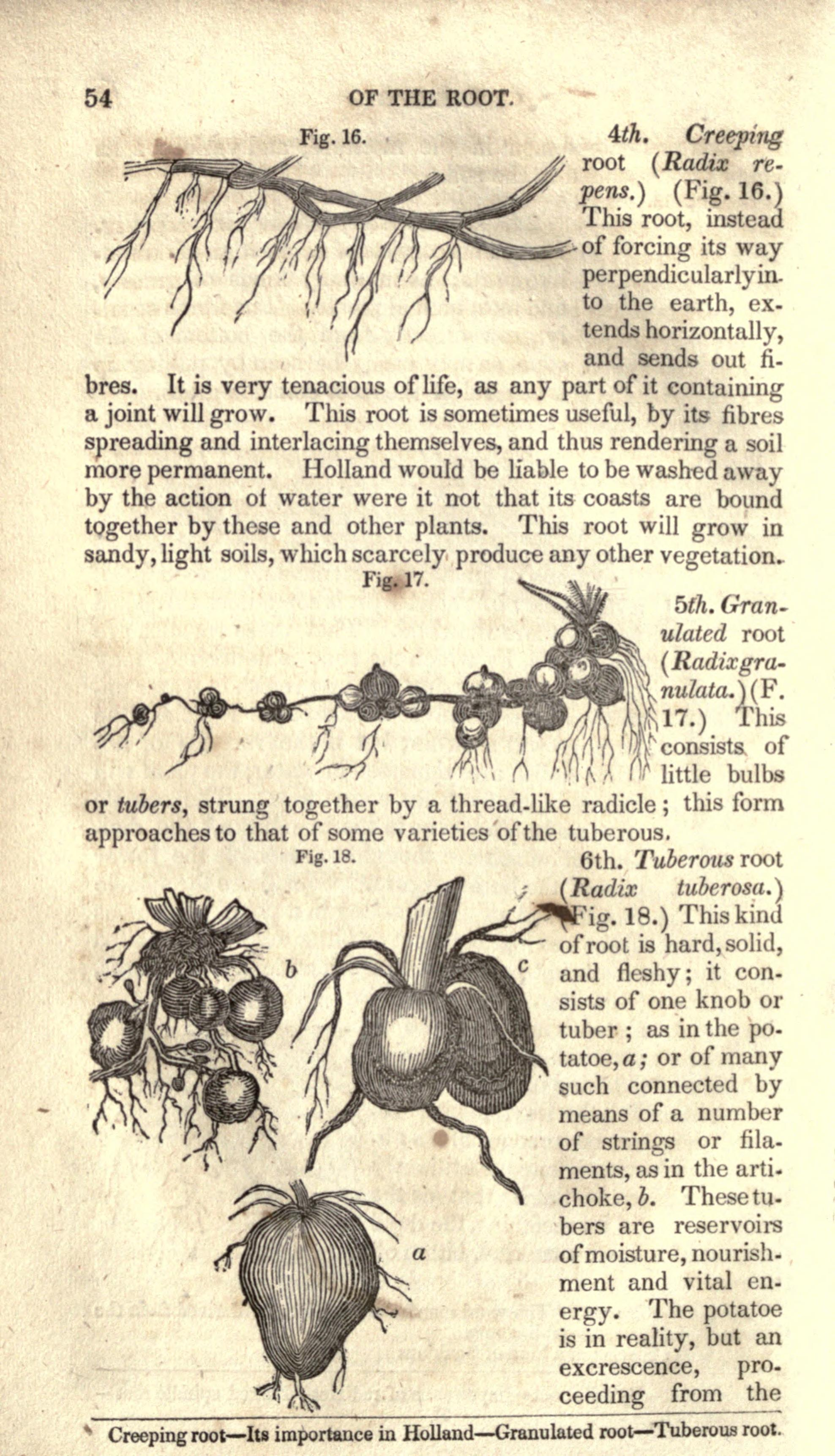
Sample page from Almira Hart Lincoln Phelps' first book: Familiar Lectures on Botany

At the age of 16, Almira began her teaching career in district schools. She later continued her own education. In 1814, she opened her first boarding school for young women at her home in Berlin, and two years later, she became principal of a school in Sandy Hill, New York.

=== Troy Female Seminary ===
In 1817, Almira married Simeon Lincoln and left her career for six years to be a housewife and mother to her three children. After her husband's death in 1823, she resumed her career in education. She became a teacher and later, in 1829, vice-principal, at the well-known Troy Female Seminary in Troy, New York, which was run by her sister Emma.

While teaching at Troy, her interest in science increased, and her botanical career began under the influence of Amos Eaton. As a teacher, Almira noticed the lack of scientific books that catered to beginning college students and was determined to remedy the issue. She sought to write a textbook that was easy to understand, thereby making it easier for young academics, particularly young women, to study the sciences. While Almira taught at the Troy Seminary, scientific study became a popular subject. She led her students in botanical field research in the vicinity of the seminary, and those who attended her lectures were excited about botany.

Under Eaton's influence, she also took up an interest in chemistry. When the Troy Seminary added a chemistry laboratory, Almira worked hard to ensure it was stocked with chemicals so she and her students could participate in scientific experiments. She was thus able to give lectures on chemistry which were illustrated through experiments, thereby enriching the quality of scientific education at the Troy Seminary.

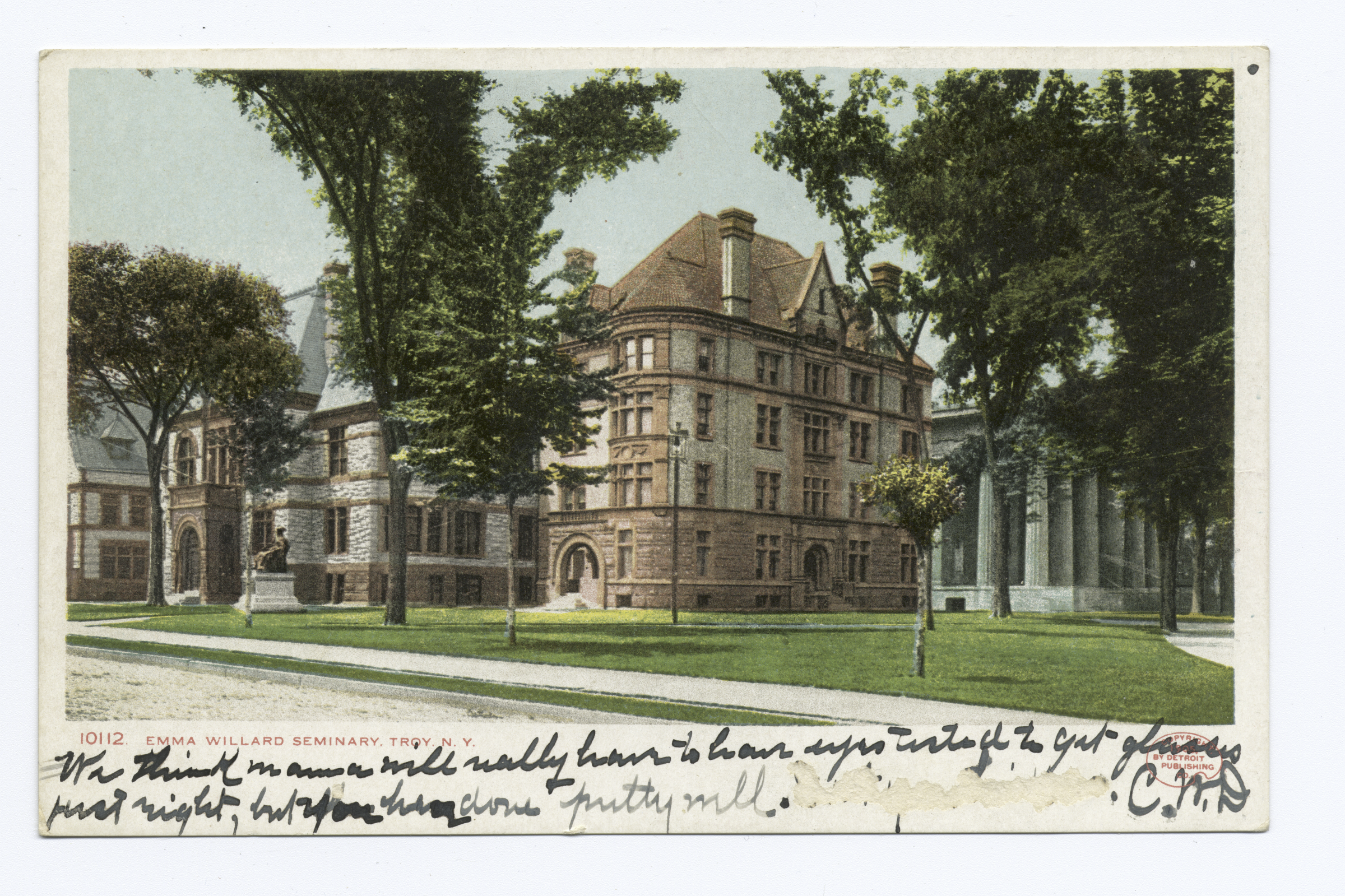
Troy Female Seminary

Encouraged by Eaton and her sister's success and driven by her own financial needs, Lincoln began to write such textbooks in the late 1820s. Her first and most notable textbook Familiar Lectures on Botany was published in 1829, going through seventeen editions and selling over 275,000 copies by 1872.

Amos Eaton believed in women's capacity for higher education, and made it a priority to invite women from the Troy Seminary to his lectures at Renesselaer Polytechnic Institute whenever possible. Eaton believed that men and women should be educated together, and made an effort throughout his life to include women in scientific instruction. From Eaton, Almira learned much about several fields, including botany, chemistry, geology, and natural philosophy.

A second professional mentor of Almira's was botanist William Darlington. He influenced her presentation of botany in her textbooks, and encouraged her to add introductory material on the Natural System of Botanical Classification, rather than solely including the Linnean System in her book. Almira took this suggestion in subsequent editions of her textbook.

In 1830, with the absence of her sister, Phelps served as acting principal of the Troy Female Seminary and gave a series of lectures related to female education that she would later publish as her second book, Lectures to Young Ladies. During this time, Almira gained important managerial experience, and began to write down some of her own ideas for women's education. During her acting principalship, Almira expanded the property of the Troy Seminary to include room for the students to cultivate their own botanical specimens on the grounds.

=== West Chester Young Ladies Seminary ===
In 1831, Almira married John Phelps, a lawyer and politician from Vermont. Taking the name "Almira Hart Lincoln Phelps", she once again gave up her career to raise a second family. Still, she continued to write new textbooks on chemistry, natural philosophy, and education.

In 1838, Phelps was appointed principal of the literary department of the West Chester Young Ladies Seminary in West Chester, Pennsylvania run by a local medical doctor, Jesse W. Cook. Phelps' stepdaughter Eunice was appointed assistant principal; another stepdaughter, Ann, and daughter Emma Lincoln were appointed teachers. Phelps's textbooks were used in several of the classes.

Almost from the very beginning, there was conflict between the Cooks and Phelpses. The Phelpses were reportedly unhappy about Mrs. Cook's interference in the school's operations, including bothering the staff. John Phelps considered Dr. Cook to be an amiable and courteous man, but unable to run the school properly and with no idea about how to properly educate young women. Another major point of contention between Almira and some of the Seminary's trustees was the place of religion in the curriculum. Almira wished to include religious instruction and worship in the curriculum, and the board of trustees wished to remain secular. Almira ultimately cited this as one of the main reasons for her later departure from the school.

As early as December 1838, Almira Phelps was considering leaving. She consulted a member of the Biddle family, trying to gain support for opening a girls' school in Philadelphia. No support was forthcoming, and Almira remained at West Chester. In April 1839, Almira offered her position to her stepdaughter, Helen Phelps. Almira considered her position, as defined by Dr. Cook, to be beneath her. Helen refused the offer. In the spring of 1839, John Phelps had conditionally leased a building in Philadelphia so that Almira could open her own school. However, Almira refused to leave West Chester. She and John were at an impasse. He believed his strong-willed wife should not be working for anyone else. Almira was concerned about self-financing her own school.

The break with the Cooks was final by the summer of 1839. Almira Phelps traveled to New York to interview with the Reverend John F. Schroeder (1800–1857), who opened a school, St. Ann's Hall at Flushing, Queens County, New York (called "Flushing, Long Island") that year. John Phelps followed his wife and finally persuaded her to open her own school. John Phelps made arrangements to lease a building in Rahway, New Jersey, and Almira Phelps established her own school in 1839. Many of the students from West Chester followed her to Rahway. The West Chester School did not survive the split between Almira Phelps and Dr. Cook and closed. None of Almira's stepdaughters taught at Rahway. Eunice married and remained in West Chester; Ann moved to Camden, South Carolina to teach for her sister Stella; and Helen had her own school in Brooklyn, New York.

=== Patapsco Female Institute ===
Ellicott Mills (now Ellicott City) had both a boys' school, Rock Hill, and a girls' school, the Patapsco Female Institute (PFI). By 1840, neither was doing well. The Protestant Episcopal Bishop of Maryland, William R. Whittingham, had a personal interest in education and became involved in both schools. Rev. Alfred Holmead transferred from Baltimore County to run Rock Hill and Bishop Whittingham. He personally interviewed Almira Phelps to become the principal of the PFI. One of the conditions for her hire was that she had to have a chaplain on the payroll. Rev. Holmead became the first chaplain at PFI. In 1841, the Phelpses closed the Rahway school and took over the PFI on a seven-year lease. Almira Phelps was very hands-on with her students and had a good relationship with them. She emphasized academic achievement to enable young women to support themselves, if necessary, as teachers or governesses. To that end, Almira actively sought positions for her students.

While at PFI, Almira's textbook sales made her a successful author. Her daughter, Jane Lincoln and stepdaughter Helen Phelps helped to edit new editions of her textbooks. The Phelpses renewed their lease in 1848 for another seven years, and John Phelps died in 1849. Almira toured Europe in 1854 and her oldest daughter, Emma Phelps O'Brien, ran the PFI while she was gone. In 1855, her second lease had expired. She stayed on an extra year. The school was expanded so that the student body at the girls' school run in Baltimore by her successor, Robert H. Archer, could be accommodated at PFI.

In 1859, Almira Phelps was the third woman elected to the American Association for the Advancement of Science. After gaining her membership, she continued to write, lecture, and revise her textbooks until she died in Baltimore on July 15, 1884, her 91st birthday.

== Personal views and philosophies ==
Almira Phelps saw science as an aid to religion and as important for women to learn. She believed that the study of science would enrich the minds of women and better prepare them to become intelligent wives to men of science, and knowledgeable mothers who were better equipped to raise children. Raised to believe that men and women had specific roles in the world, Almira saw the things she taught as an important aid toward helping women thrive in their roles as wives and mothers. Similarly, Almira believed that science and religion supported each other, and encouraged women to study science as a way of strengthening their religious convictions. She believed strongly that such a firm faith would be beneficial to future mothers, who could rear their children to honor God.

Though she was a strong advocate for women's education in the nineteenth century, Almira herself was adamantly and vocally opposed to women's suffrage. She championed feminine grace and delicacy, and firmly believed that a woman's place was ultimately in the home. Among Almira's students' generation, especially, there were many suffragists who advocated for equal rights.

== Select works ==
- Familiar Lectures on Botany (1829)
- Dictionary of Chemistry (1830)
- Botany for Beginners (1831)
- Geology for Beginners (1832)
- Female Student; or, Fireside Friend (1833)
- Chemistry for Beginners (1834)
- Lectures on Natural Philosophy (1835)
- Lectures on Chemistry (1837)
- Natural Philosophy for Beginners (1837)
- Hours With My Pupils (1869)
- Caroline Westerly (1833)
- Ida Norman (1850)
- Christian Household (1860)

== See also ==
- Timeline of women in science
