= Elisha Foote =

American judge

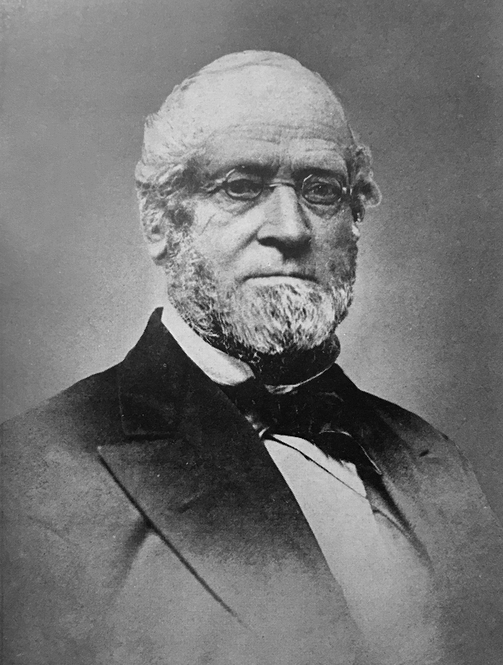

11th United States Commissioner of Patents
- In office July 29, 1868 – March 1869
- President: Andrew Johnson
- Preceded by: Thomas Clarke Theaker
- Succeeded by: Samuel S. Fisher

Personal details
- Born: August 1, 1809 Lee, Massachusetts, U.S.
- Died: October 22, 1883 (aged 74) St. Louis, Missouri, U.S.
- Spouse: Eunice Newton (m. 1841)
- Children: Mary; Augusta

Elisha Foote (August 1, 1809 – October 22, 1883) was an American judge, inventor, and mathematician. He served as the eleventh United States Commissioner of Patents from 1868 to 1869 and was responsible for launching an investigation into previous mismanagement of the post. He was married to the scientist and women's rights campaigner Eunice Newton Foote.

== Early life ==
Foote was born in Lee, Massachusetts on August 1, 1809. He was the son of Elisha Foote (died April 8, 1846) and Delia (née Battle) Foote. He was the cousin of US Senator Solomon Foot of Vermont. Foote was educated at the Albany Institute.

== Career ==
Foote studied law with Judge Daniel Cady in Johnstown, New York. Henry Stanton, husband of Judge Cady's daughter Elizabeth, also studied with her father. During his studies, Foote worked as a teacher and surveyor. After being admitted to the bar, he settled in western New York. On August 12, 1841, he married Eunice Newton of East Bloomfield, New York. She would become a scientist and inventor. They would have two daughters, while living in Seneca Falls, Mary, born July 21, 1842, who later became an artist, feminist and writer and Augusta, born October 24, 1844, who later became a writer.

Foote served as district attorney and then judge of the court of common pleas of Seneca County, New York, before resigning in 1846. After resigning his judgeship, Foote worked in private practice. His specialty was patent law, and he made several valuable inventions. The family moved to Saratoga Springs around 1860. They were living there when in 1865 he was appointed to serve an apprenticeship on the Board of Examiners-in-Chief U. S. Patent Office in Washington, D.C.

On July 25, 1868, Foote was appointed as the eleventh Commissioner of Patents, to fill the remaining term of Thomas Clarke Theaker who was forced to resign. When Foote became commissioner, he began investigating expenditures of the department, noting that the quantities of supplies and the prices paid for them were exorbitant. He filed a complaint with the Secretary of the Interior and an investigation was launched. The findings of the commission which investigated the complaint found that the office had lost over $80,000 over the previous one year period. There was evidence of handshake agreements, though legally a contract was required, as well as incidents of over ordering and under delivery of goods. He also discovered cases in which patents had been granted for money, rather on their merits. It was widely believed that Foote would be retained for a second term, when his post expired in 1869. He did not campaign for retention. Instead, he remained on the Board of Examiners-in-Chief for several years and then returned to private practice of patent law. He and Eunice remained in Washington for several years, but had returned to New York by 1878.

From the late 1870s to early 1880s, Foote was involved with Mary's husband, John B. Henderson in a series of lawsuits against Missouri counties for failure to make good on railway bonds. The Supreme Court of Missouri ruled that the law which allowed counties to collect taxes to pay for railroad bonds was unconstitutional, but the United States Supreme Court disagreed with the lower court. The cases were remanded to the District Court for the Western District of Missouri and the Circuit Court, which confirmed the Supreme Court ruling and ordered the counties to pay Foote. They won judgments in Cape Girardeau County, Lincoln County, Macon County, Marion County, and Pike County, among others. In some cases the judgments were tens of thousands of dollars and media reported that the judgements were worth millions.

Foote was the author of several books and papers on mathematics. In 1870, he became one of the founding members of the National Institute of Applied Sciences. He patented several mechanical inventions, including a skate, a drying machine, and a reaping and binding machine.

== Death and legacy ==
Foote died in St. Louis, Missouri on October 22, 1883. Eunice died five years later, on September 30, 1888, in Lenox, Massachusetts.

== Patents ==
- US patent 2636, Foote, Elisha, "Regulating the Draft of Stoves", published May 26, 1842
- US patent 45,148, Foote, Elisha, "Skate", published November 22, 1864
- US patent 124,944, Foote, Elisha & Smith, Marshall P., "Improvement in Driers", published March 26, 1872
- US patent 135,899, Foote, Elisha, "Improvement in Grain-Bands, Bag-Ties, &c.", published February 18, 1873
- US patent 137,905, Foote, Elisha, "Improvement in Gas-Burners", published April 15, 1873
- US patent 244,876, Foote, Elisha, "Machinery for Reaping and Binding Grain", published July 26, 1881
