= Augusta Foote Arnold =

American naturalist and author

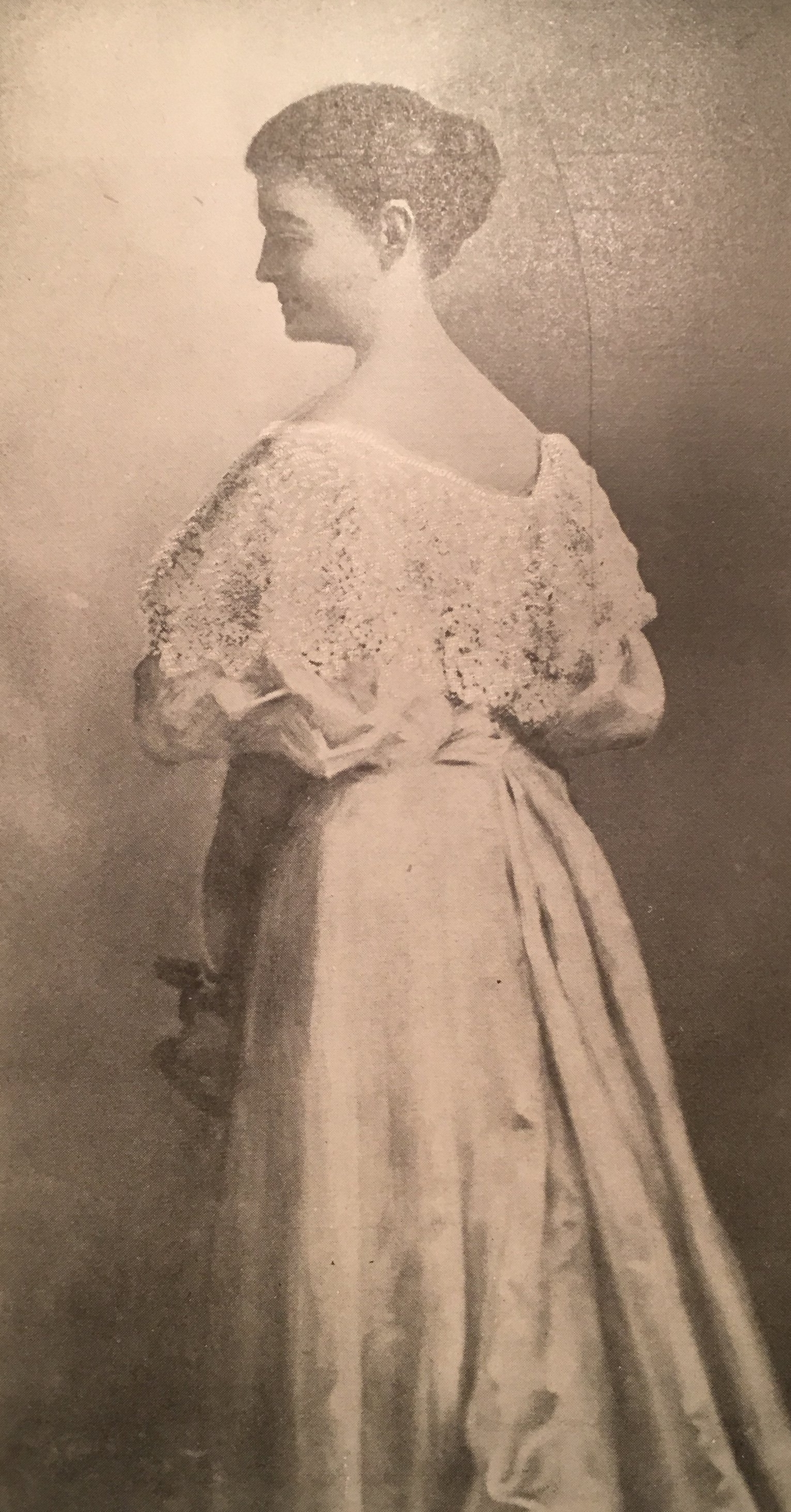
- Wedding photo, 1869, at 24 years of age
- Born: Augusta Newton Foote; October 24, 1844; Seneca Falls, New York, U.S.
- Died: May 9, 1904 (aged 59); Manhattan, New York, U.S.
- Other name: Mary Ronald
- Known for: Writing books on cooking and scientific natural history of marine life
- Spouse: Francis Benjamin Arnold (m. 1869)
- Children: 3
- Parents: Eunice Newton; Elisha Foote
- Relatives: Mary Foote Henderson (sister); Samuel A. Foot (uncle); John Henderson Jr. (nephew)

Augusta Newton Foote Arnold (October 24, 1844 – May 9, 1904) was an American author and naturalist who published three books – two cookery books under the pen name of Mary Ronald, and The Sea-Beach at Ebb-Tide, regarded as a seminal work on the intertidal biology of the United States.

== Personal life ==
Augusta was born in Seneca Falls, New York. Her father was Elisha Foote, a judge, mathematician, inventor, and a commissioner of the US Patent Office. Her mother was Eunice Newton, who is considered the first female scientist to perform experiments in her own laboratory. Eunice Newton Foote described and explained the "Green House Gas Effect" in 1856, three years before Irishman John Tyndall who is widely credited with that research. Her mother Eunice was also a women's rights campaigner, one of the signers of the seminal Declaration of Sentiments in that effort. Her older sister was the artist and writer Mary Foote Henderson, who married U.S. Senator John B. Henderson, the co-author of the Thirteenth Amendment to the United States Constitution which abolished slavery. Augusta and Mary both carried on their parents' legacy of science. She was educated at private schools in Saratoga Springs, New York.

Augusta Foote married Francis Benjamin Arnold on March 6, 1869, in the nation's capital. He was the son of Benjamin Green Arnold (founding president of the Coffee Exchange in the 1880s) and Frances Snow, and the brother of Charlotte Bruce Arnold (1842–1924). The couple had two sons and a daughter: Benjamin Foote Arnold (1870–1896), Henry Newton Arnold (1873–1939), who served as Assistant Attorney General under George W. Wickersham in the Taft Administration, and Frances A. Arnold (1874–1975).

She died at age 59, on May 9, 1904, at her residence, 101 West 78th Street in New York City. After a funeral at All Souls' Church, she was buried at Woodlawn Cemetery in Bronx, New York.

== Career ==
Augusta wrote three books, two under a pseudonym. Her first, in 1895, was The Century Cook Book, as Mary Ronald. In 1901 The Century Company of New York published her seminal biology-research handbook The Sea-beach at Ebb Tide - A Guide to the Study of the Seaweeds and the Lower Animal Life Found between Tide-Marks. A second cookbook, Luncheons - A Cook's Picture Book (A Supplement to the Century Cook Book) was issued in 1905.

Arnold's second book was her only work of scientific writing. It was a guide to the flora and invertebrate fauna of the inter-tidal zones of the coasts of the United States, particularly the eastern coast. This book was promoted in the nation's most popular children's magazine of that era, the St. Nicholas Magazine, and it may have influenced a generation of American naturalists. Two prominent workers in that field, Rachel Carson and Ed Ricketts, cited Arnold's book in their bibliographies. The popular writer John Steinbeck, who was an avid supporter of coastal research and discovery, was known to have been a reader of the magazine. American marine biologists Myrtle E. Johnson, Richard Knapp Allen, and Joel Hedgpeth, mention or comment on The Sea Beach at Ebb-Tide in their writings.

Arnold was a member of the Torrey Botanical Club and of the American Association for the Advancement of Science, indicating that she viewed herself as a serious scientist.

=== Eponyms ===
Although the identity of the person honored by the specific name of the Pacific leaping blenny (Alticus arnoldorum), is unclear, Anthony Curtiss who described that species is known to have read The Sea-Beach at Ebb-Tide and gave several other taxa a similar epithet, which is thought to be in commemoration of Augusta Foote Arnold.

=== Gallery ===
A sample of plates from The Sea-Beach at Ebb-Tide:

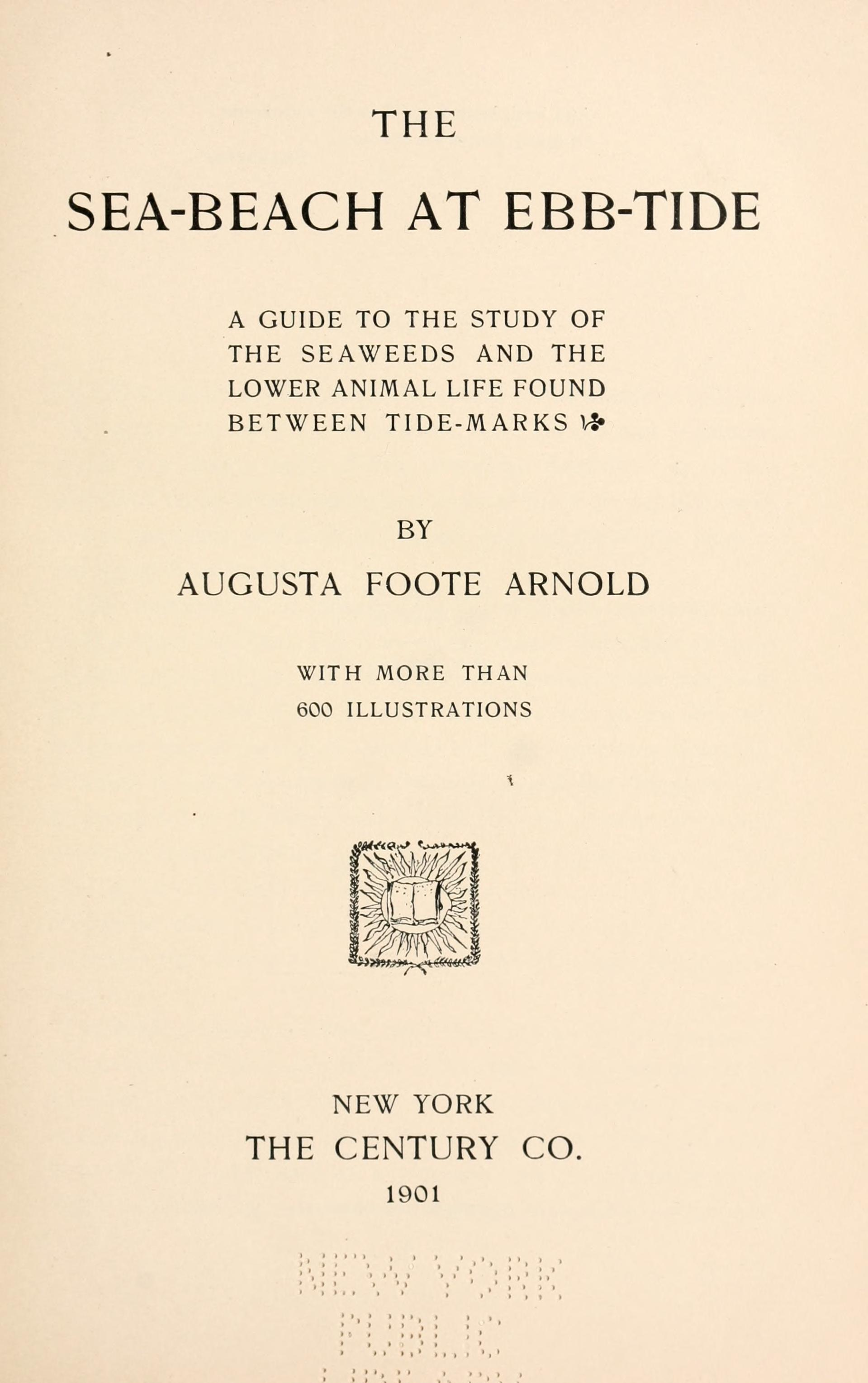
Frontispiece

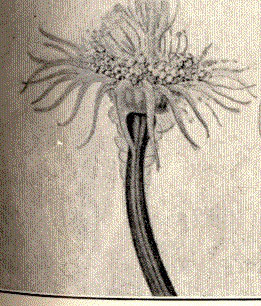
Hybocodon prolifer

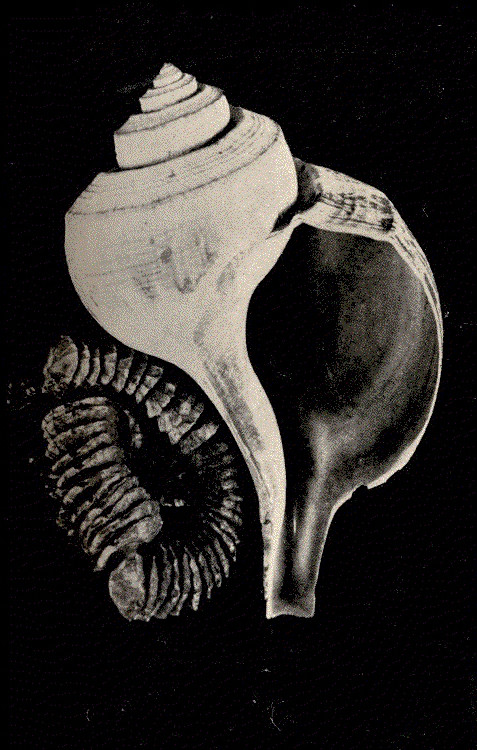
Fulgur canalliculava whelk and egg cases

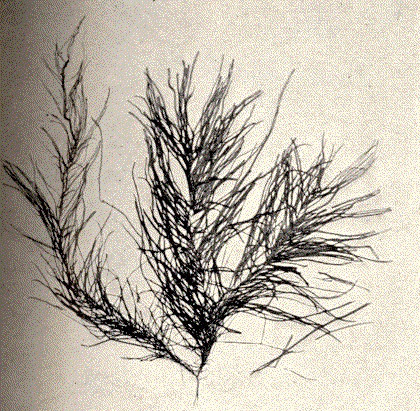
Ulva compressa, 1753 Enteromorpha, 1820 Thread Weed, 2010

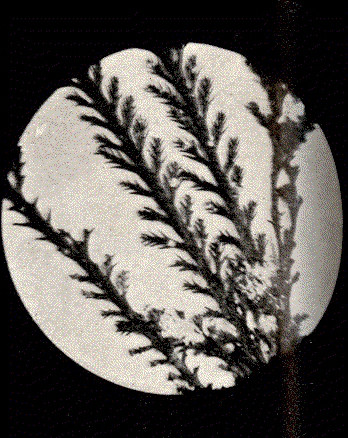
Polysiphonia dendroidea, a piece magnified

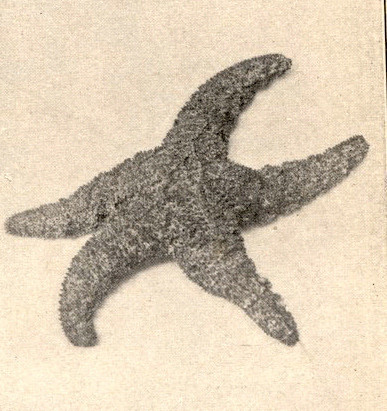
Asterias ochracea, 1835 Genus Pisaster, 1840 Pisaster ochraceus, 1914 Ochre "Sea" Star, 1927
