= Allan Dick =

Allan Dick may refer to:

- Allan Dick (politician) (1915–1992), New Zealand politician
- Allan Dick (field hockey) (born 1983), Scottish field hockey player
- Allan Brugh Dick (1833–1926), Scottish metallurgical chemist who first described the eponymous mineral dickite

== See also ==
- List of people with surname Dick
- Dick Allen (disambiguation)
