= Mary Foote Henderson =

American author, real estate developer and social activist

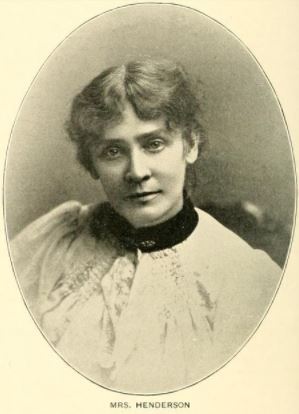
- Portrait of Mary Foote Henderson from the Washington Times of December 23, 1904
- Born: Mary Foote; July 21, 1842; Seneca Falls, New York, U.S.
- Died: July 16, 1931 (aged 88); Bar Harbor, Maine, U.S.
- Education: Temple Grove Ladies Seminary; Ashgrove Seminary
- Spouse: John B. Henderson (m. 1868; died 1913)
- Children: 3, including John Jr.
- Parents: Eunice Newton; Elisha Foote
- Relatives: Augusta Foote Arnold (sister); Samuel A. Foot (uncle)

Mary Foote Henderson (July 21, 1842 – July 16, 1931) was an American author, real estate developer, and social activist from the U.S. state of New York who was known as "The Empress of Sixteenth Street". Henderson was a notable advocate of women's suffrage, temperance and vegetarianism.

== Early life and education ==
She was born in Seneca Falls, New York, the daughter of Eunice Newton, a scientist and women's rights campaigner, and Elisha Foote, a prominent lawyer and judge, and the niece of Senator Samuel A. Foot of Connecticut and numerous other aunts and uncles. Mother Eunice born in Bloomfield, New York described the Greenhouse Gas effect in 1856 and also held several patents. Eunice was also a signatory of the "Declaration of Sentiments" at the first Women's Rights Convention and a member of the Editorial Committee in 1848. Elisha moved his family to Washington, D.C. during the Civil War while he served as Commissioner of the US Patent Office.

Mary Henderson was educated at Temple Grove Ladies Seminary (now Skidmore College), Saratoga Springs and at Ashgrove Seminary, in Albany, finishing at a French school in New York City. She was fluent in French and had a lifelong interest in painting and art collecting.

== Career ==
In June 1868, she married John B. Henderson, Senator from Missouri (1862–1869) who introduced the thirteenth amendment to the Constitution that abolished slavery and one of seven Republicans who voted against the impeachment of President Andrew Johnson in May 1868. That unpopular decision ended his career as senator, and he and his new wife moved back to Missouri, living first in the town of Louisiana and then in St. Louis.

=== Life in St. Louis ===
Henderson pursued many interests in St. Louis. Like her mother before her, she believed in woman's suffrage, and became president of the Missouri State Suffrage Association. She studied art at Washington University in St. Louis, and co-founded the St. Louis School of Design as well as the St. Louis Women's Exchange with Rebecca Naylor Hazard. Known as an excellent hostess, she wrote a guide to fine entertaining, Practical Cooking and Dinner Giving, in 1877. In 1885, Henderson published a second cookbook, Diet for the Sick, A Treatise on the Values of Foods.

The Hendersons became very wealthy, when John Henderson bought up enormous quantities of supposedly worthless bonds that Missouri counties had issued after the war. Purchased at ten cents on the dollar, the bonds became valuable when the courts ordered counties to pay Henderson their full face value.

=== Life in Washington, D.C. ===
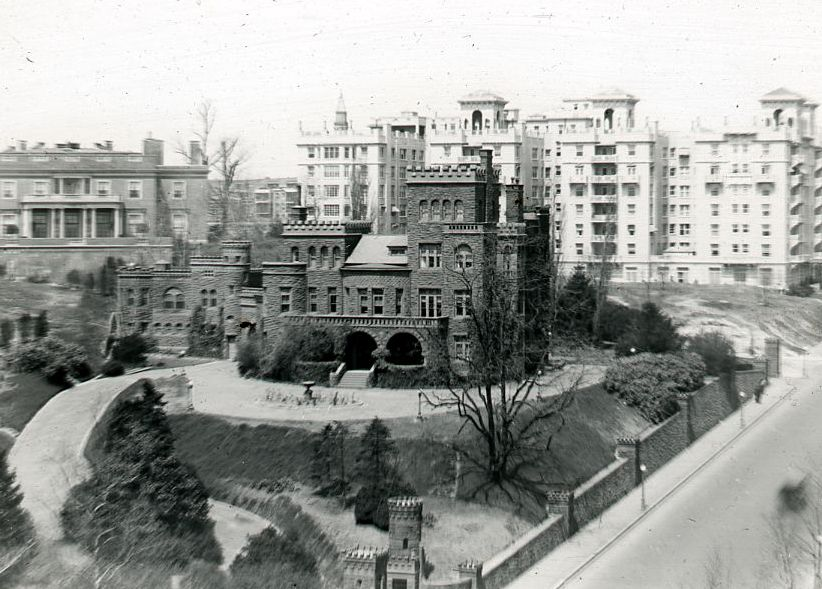
Henderson Castle in Washington, D.C., built in 1889 and razed in 1949

In 1889, after accumulating a fortune, the Hendersons moved back to Washington D.C., where they built a castle-like mansion on Sixteenth Street called "Boundary Castle" or "Henderson Castle." The Hendersons bought up dozens of lots outside the northern boundary of the city in the area known as Meridian Hill. Mary Henderson's interest in the immediate neighborhood, which coincided with the City Beautiful Movement of the early 20th century, ultimately led to the construction of the Meridian Hill Malcolm X Park and eviction of the community of working-class African Americans who resided in the area.

Henderson bought blocks of real estate and had elaborate residences constructed that she sold as embassies. The architect, George Oakley Totten Jr., designed nearly a dozen buildings on 15th and 16th Streets in the Meridian Hill area to enhance the area for diplomatic uses. She frequently lobbied Congress for various projects to improve and beautify the Meridian Hill area. She supported two successive plans, by architect Paul J. Pelz in 1898 by Franklin W. Smith in 1900, to construct a colossal presidential mansion on Meridian Hill to replace the White House. In addition to these plans, she also had a home constructed on 16th Street and offered it to the government as use as the Vice President's mansion. She also lobbied for the Lincoln Memorial to be built on the site of Meridian Hill Park.

== Personal life ==
In June 1868, she married John B. Henderson (1826–1913), who served as a Senator from Missouri from 1862 until 1869. Together, they were the parents of three children, including:

- John Brooks Henderson Jr. (1870–1923), who married Angelica Schuyler Crosby (1872–1907), daughter of John Schuyler Crosby and granddaughter of Clarkson F. Crosby and Stephen Van Rensselaer IV, in 1903.

Henderson became a strong advocate for temperance and vegetarianism, and published a book on health and diet called The Aristocracy of Health. When her husband died in 1913, she had his entire wine cellar, a thirty-year collection of costly wines, emptied into the street. She died aged 90 in Bar Harbor, Maine.

=== Descendants ===
She was the adopted grandmother of Beatrice Van Rensselaer Henderson (1906–1992), who was married to Joseph Wholean (1894–1971) in 1926.

=== Legacy ===
In 1925, Henderson also donated land to the District of Columbia for the construction of the Mount Pleasant Library at 3160 Sixteenth Street. Henderson's most well known crusade was to change the name of 16th Street to "Avenue of the Presidents," and to line the street with busts of all the Presidents and Vice Presidents of the United States. While she actually succeeded in having legislation passed to change the name of the street in 1913, the Commission of Fine Arts denied her request to construct the busts. One year later, because the name "Avenue of the Presidents" proved to be unpopular, the original 16th Street name was restored.

Following her death at Bar Harbor, Maine in 1931, the Commission of Fine Arts praised her efforts and her vision of Meridian Hill. A report by the Commission stated:

Persistently she labored during four decades, persuading and convincing Senators and Representatives; single-handed and alone she appeared before committees of Congress to urge approval for the work of development. She won.

== Publications ==
- Practical Cooking and Dinner Giving. New York: Harper & Brothers, 1877.
- Diet for the Sick, A Treatise on the Values of Foods, 1885.
- The Aristocracy of Health: A Study of Physical Culture, Our Favorite Poisons, and a National and International League for the Advancement of Physical Culture, 1904.
