= Richard Knapp Allen =

American zoologist and entomologist

Richard Knapp Dick Allen
- Born: Richard Knapp Allen; 21 April 1925; Salt Lake City, Utah, United States
- Died: 7 August 1992 (aged 67)
- Occupations: zoologist, entomologist
- Years active: 1940-1992
- Known for: zoology

Richard Knapp "Dick" Allen (April 21, 1925 - August 7, 1992) was an American invertebrate zoologist and entomologist. He was academically trained in Utah and specialised in entomology, in particular mayflies. Later, after moving to Los Angeles, California, he added the study of marine invertebrates of the Pacific coast as a university professor.

Although Allen was born in Salt Lake City, Utah, where he later studied at the local university for his degrees in zoology at the University of Utah. However, he spent his teaching career at the California State University at Los Angeles, including studies of seashore animals without backbones, mentoring graduate students that researched mayfly taxonomy, finally medically retiring in 1976 following a diagnosis of terminal cancer which proved to be overly pessimistic. His last years were spent Lake San Marcos, California near the ocean, where he enjoyed sailing on his boat.

The noteworthy book by Allen, Common Intertidal Invertebrates of Southern California, was first published in 1967 with a focus on Gastropoda (snails), followed two years later in 1969 with coverage of all taxonomic groups of marine invertebrates, and finally with a third edition in 1976 with greater focus on covering many additional species of marine invertebrates. Within the 1976 third edition of this book, on page iii of the Preface, Allen positively acknowledged Augusta Foote Arnold with recognition for writing the first popular book on coastal marine life of the seashore, both animals and algae as well as one plant, of the intertidal wetland zones of North America, as follows: "The first popular guide to the intertidal zone was The Sea-Beach at Ebb-Tide published by Augusta Foote Arnold in 1901. The volume is still available at Dover Publications, Inc., New York, reprinted in 1968. The great emphasis is for the identification of Atlantic coast plants and animals, but the treatment also includes discussions of nearly 100 Pacific coast genera and several species."
