= Rick Allen (organist) =

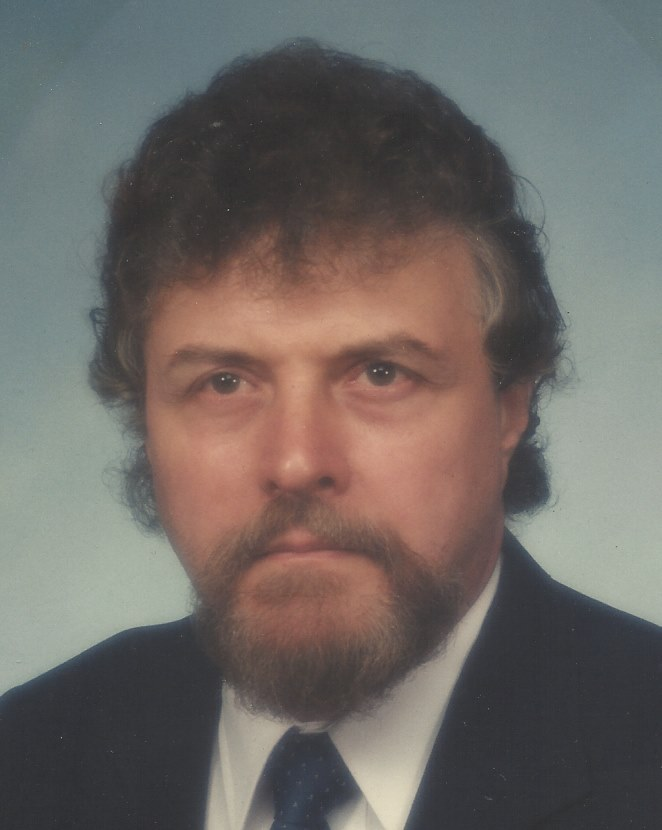
- Photo of Rick Allen

Background information
- Born: 1940s Near Los Angeles, California
- Genres: Rock and R&B
- Instrument: Organ

Rick Allen is an American blues, rock and R&B Hammond organist and pianist. In the 1960s, he played organ trio gigs in Los Angeles and did session work with singers and guitarists such as Jerry McGee and Rick Vito. In the 1970s, he toured with Don Preston, and recorded with Delaney & Bonnie. Allen moved to New Orleans in the 1980s, where he played and recorded with a number of blues and cajun performers including Ernie K-Doe, King Floyd, Freddy Fender, Marcia Ball.

== Career ==
=== Early years ===
Allen was born near Los Angeles in the mid-1940s, and he began playing drums at age five, guitar at age seven, piano at nine and Hammond Organ at age 11. He practiced in department stores and churches, because his parents could not afford an organ. Blues and R&B were very popular in Los Angeles in the 1950s. As a boy, Allen listened to performers such as Howlin' Wolf, Otis Rush, Buddy Guy, John Lee Hooker, and Muddy Waters.

At age eighteen, he joined The Bonnevilles, a touring band from Milwaukee led by guitarist Larry Lynne. The group played nightclubs all around the Midwestern states, and accompanied Jimmy Clanton in Milwaukee and Johnny "Guitar" Watson in California. They also played with The Olympics. In the 1960s, Allen started to learn the jazz organ styles of Hammond Organ virtuoso Jimmy Smith.

=== 1960s ===
In 1964, Allen and Larry Lynne formed a band called "The Skunks", and as a gimmick, the band members dyed their hair black, and bleached white "skunk-stripes" on the sides. The Skunks were signed with Chess Records in Chicago, where they recorded two songs. Sonny Boy Williamson played harmonica on one of the tunes, "Fanny Mae", but the record was never released.

In California, Allen played with jazz tenor sax player Tom Fabre, and began playing organ trio gigs in Watts and South Central Los Angeles. The group played the "off nights" in the jazz clubs that booked Jimmy Smith, "Groove" Holmes, Shirley Scott and Baby Face Willette. Allen began playing in Hollywood on the Sunset Strip at The Galaxy in the band Al and the Originals. The lead singer was Bobby Angelle and the guitarist was Arthur Adams. After Allen left, Dennis Provisor took his place in the band. With Angelle, Rick recorded some songs on Liberty Records with Dr. John and former Raylettes' Clydie King, Shirley Matthews and Venetta Fields.

Allen also worked with Etta James for several weeks at the Californian Club in L.A. Bobby Angelle, Arthur Adams and he also recorded songs on Money Records. Allen played with a band called Blue Rose, and did session work with singer Joanne Vent on A&M Records, and Genya Ravan, (with guitarists Jerry McGee and Rick Vito, plus drummer Eddie Tuduri) on ABC Records.

=== 1970s and 1980s ===
In 1973, Allen went on a national tour with Dalton and Dubarri. In 1974, Rick went on the road again, this time with Don Preston, guitarist for Leon Russell. They played show clubs from New York to California, and recorded an album in San Francisco for Shelter Records. Also in 1974, Rick did several recordings with Delaney Bramlett, including an album for MGM Records and two albums for Motown Records. In 1978, Rick went on tour with Bonnie Bramlett, for Capricorn Records.

Allen and his wife Anne moved to New Orleans in 1983, and Allen began working in blues clubs with Mighty Sam McClain and drummer Kerry Brown. Later, he worked with Ernie K-Doe, (Mother in Law), Jesse Hill, Bobby Mitchell, Johnny Adams, Jay Monque’D, King Floyd, C.P.Love, The Boogie Kings, and Guitar Slim Junior". In 1991, Allen began doing studio work at Allen Toussaint's Sea Saint Studios in New Orleans with producer/engineer Roger Branch.

Allen contributed to many albums at Sea Saint, including recordings by slide guitar bluesman Brint Anderson, Freddy Fender, Marcia Ball and Robert "Barefootin" Parker. He played on Orleans Records recordings by artists like Cajun blues singer Coco Robicheaux, blues singers Rocky Charles, Little Freddie King, Mighty Sam McClain and others.

=== 1990s ===
In 2000, Allen was nominated for a Grammy Award with The Dukes of Dixieland and drummer Richard Taylor, for the album Gloryland. In the 2000s, Allen and his wife Anne lived in the bayou country of south Louisiana.
