= John B. Henderson =

American politician (1826–1913)

John Henderson
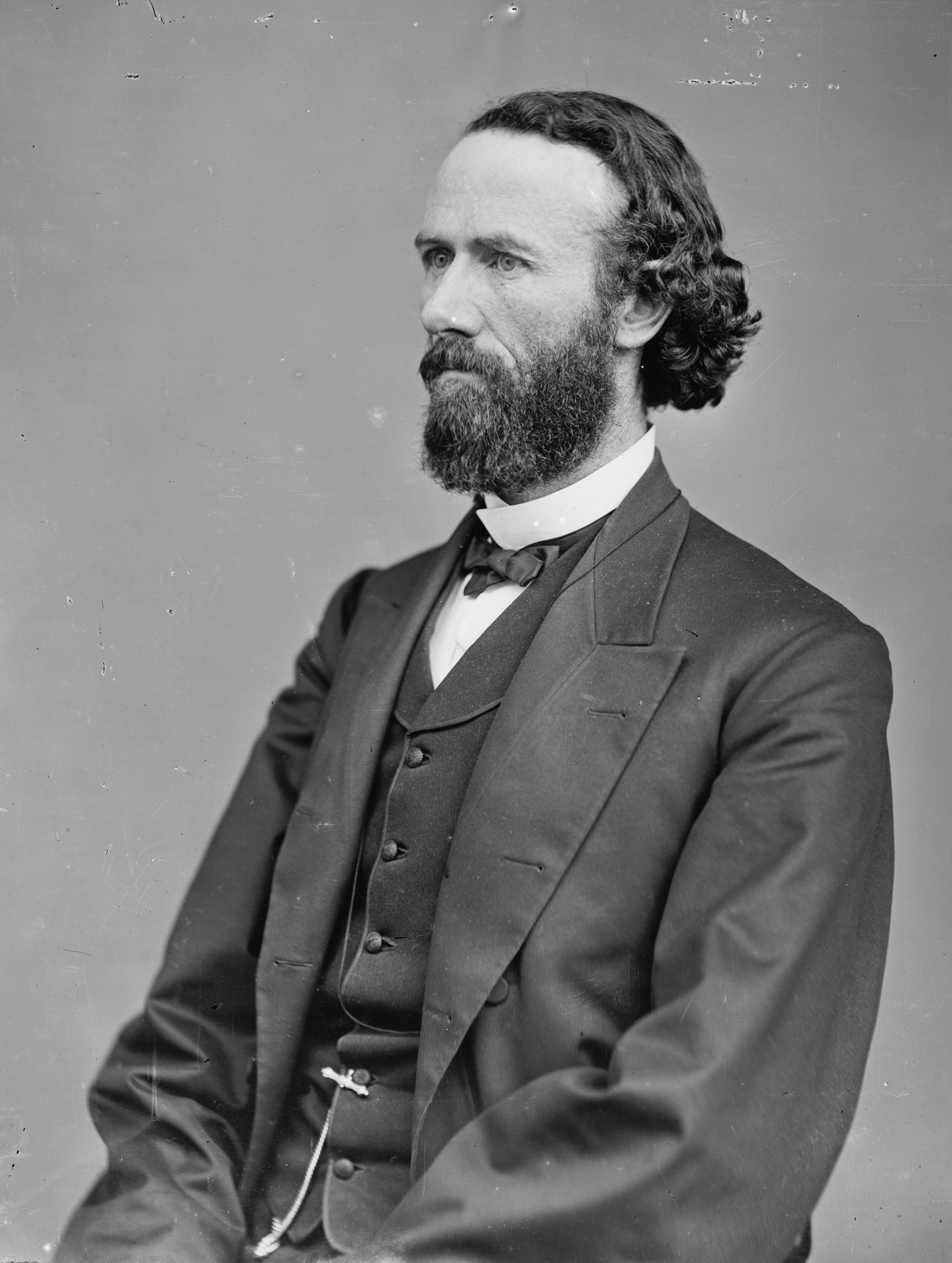
- Henderson c. 1861

United States Senator from Missouri
- In office January 17, 1862 – March 3, 1869
- Preceded by: Trusten Polk
- Succeeded by: Carl Schurz

Personal details
- Born: John Brooks Henderson; November 16, 1826 near Danville, Virginia, U.S.
- Died: April 12, 1913 (aged 86) Washington, D.C., U.S.
- Party: Democratic (before 1862); Union (1862–63); Emancipation (1863); Radical Union (after 1863)
- Spouse: Mary Foote (m. 1868)
- Children: 3, including John

Military service
- Allegiance: United States
- Branch/service: Missouri Militia
- Rank: Brigadier General

John Brooks Henderson (November 16, 1826 – April 12, 1913) was an American attorney and politician who represented Missouri in the United States Senate from 1862 to 1869.

Henderson is most noteworthy for co-authoring the Thirteenth Amendment to the United States Constitution, which abolished slavery except as punishment for crime. After leaving the Senate, Henderson served as the first special prosecutor in United States history, investigating the Whiskey Ring, until he was fired by President Ulysses S. Grant.

== Early life ==
Born near Danville, Virginia, he moved with his parents to Lincoln County, Missouri, studied on his own while a farm hand, taught school, was admitted to the bar in 1844, and practiced.

== Political career ==
Henderson was a member of the Missouri House of Representatives in 1848-1850 and 1856–1858, and was active in Democratic politics. He was commissioned a brigadier general in the Missouri State Militia in 1861, commanding federal forces in northeast Missouri.

On January 17, 1862, Henderson was appointed to the U.S. Senate as a Unionist to fill the vacancy caused by the expulsion of Trusten Polk. He won the January 1863 special election to complete Polk's term and was re-elected later that year, serving until 1869. Henderson changed parties several times during this period as the party system in Missouri underwent a political realignment. A conservative unionist, he was nominated by the Emancipation Party in the January 1863 special election, representing the moderate wing of the party that favored gradual emancipation. He campaigned for the Conservative candidates in the 1863 Missouri judicial elections, but afterwards formed an alliance with the Radicals in the Missouri General Assembly and was re-elected as a Radical Unionist in November 1863.

=== 13th Amendment ===
As a United States Senator representing a slave state, Henderson co-authored and co-sponsored the Thirteenth Amendment to the United States Constitution permanently prohibiting slavery in the United States. Henderson's original proposal, made January 11, 1864, was submitted to the Senate Judiciary Committee, and on February 10, 1864, it presented the Senate with a proposal combining the drafts of congressmen James Mitchell Ashley (Republican, Ohio), James Falconer Wilson, (Republican, Iowa), Charles Sumner (Republican, Massachusetts), and Henderson.

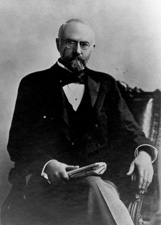
John B. Henderson in his elder years.

On January 31, 1865, the 13th Amendment was approved by the U.S. Congress, and on February 1, 1865, it was signed by President Abraham Lincoln. On April 14, 1865, Lincoln was assassinated before the amendment was ratified by the State of Georgia on December 6, 1865.

While in the Senate, Henderson was chairman of the committee to Audit and Control the Contingent Expense (Thirty-ninth Congress) and a member of the Committee on Indian Affairs (Thirty-ninth and Fortieth Congresses).

During President Andrew Johnson's impeachment trial, Henderson broke party ranks, along with nine other Republican senators and voted for acquittal. Among them, seven Republican senators were disturbed by how the proceedings had been manipulated in order to give a one-sided presentation of the evidence. In addition to Henderson, the other senators expressing those concerns were Senators William Pitt Fessenden, Joseph S. Fowler, James W. Grimes, Lyman Trumbull, Peter G. Van Winkle, and Edmund G. Ross of Kansas, who provided the decisive vote, defied their party and public opinion and voted against conviction. The other three Republican senators to vote against convicting Johnson were James Dixon, James Rood Doolittle, Daniel Sheldon Norton After the trial, Congressman Benjamin Butler conducted hearings on the widespread reports that Republican senators had been bribed to vote for Johnson's acquittal. In Butler's hearings, and in subsequent inquiries, there was increasing evidence that some acquittal votes were acquired by promises of patronage jobs and cash cards.

Henderson was not a candidate for reelection to the Senate in 1868 and left the U.S. Senate on March 3, 1869.

Henderson was an unsuccessful candidate for Governor of Missouri and later U.S. Senator. In 1875, he was appointed by Ulysses Grant as a special United States attorney for prosecution of the Whiskey Ring at St. Louis. After attempting to stifle Henderson's investigation of the president's personal secretary, Grant fired Henderson on the basis that Henderson's statements to a grand jury regarding Grant were impertinent. Following criticism, Grant appointed a new special prosecutor, James Broadhead, to continue the investigation. In 1877, Henderson was appointed a commissioner to treat with hostile tribes of Indians.

== Later life ==
Henderson returned to Washington, D.C. in the late 1880s. He and his wife, Mary Foote Henderson, lived in Henderson Castle until his death in 1913. Interment was in Green-Wood Cemetery, Brooklyn, New York.

== Notes ==
U.S. Senate
Preceded by Trusten Polk	U.S. Senator (Class 1) from Missouri; 1862–1869; Served alongside: Robert Wilson, B. Gratz Brown, Charles D. Drake	Succeeded by Carl Schurz
Preceded by James R. Doolittle	Chair of the Senate Indian Affairs Committee; 1867–1869	Succeeded by James Harlan
Party political offices
Preceded by Joseph W. McClurg	Republican nominee for Governor of Missouri; 1872	Succeeded by William Gentry
Honorary titles
Preceded by James Bradbury	Most Senior Living U.S. Senator; Sitting or Former; 1901–1913	Succeeded by William Sprague
